= List of primary education systems by country =

Primary education covers phase 1 of the ISCED scale.

== National approaches ==
=== Africa ===
==== Libya ====
- 1st grade: 6 to 7 years old
- 2nd grade: 7 to 8 years old
- 3rd grade: 8 to 9 years old
- 4th grade: 9 to 10 years old
- 5th grade: 10 to 11 years old
- 6th grade: 11 to 12 years old
- 7th grade: 12 to 13 years old
- 8th grade: 13 to 14 years old
- 9th grade: 14 to 15 years old

==== Morocco ====
- crèche (0–3 years old)
- École maternelle
- (pre-school)toute petite section (2–3 years old)
- Cycle I
- petite section (3–4 years old)
- moyenne section (4–5 years old)
- grande section (5–6 years old) (September - January)
- Cycle II
- grande section (5–6 years old) (February - July)
- École primaire (primary/elementary)
- CP (cours préparatoire) (6–7 years old)
- CE1 (cours élémentaire 1) (7–8 years old)
- Cycle III
- CE2 (cours élémentaire 2) (8–9 years old)
- CM1 (cours moyen 1) (9–10 years old)
- CM2 (cours moyen 2) (10–11 years old)
- Collège (11 – 15 years old - junior high school) Brevet diploma
- Lycée (15 – 18 years old - senior high school) Baccalauréat diploma

==== Somalia ====
In Somalia, pupils start primary school when they are 7 and finish it at the age of 11 starting from form 1 to form 4. Pupils must firstly have attended casual school known as dugsi and learnt the Muslim holy book Qur'an, and the meaning of the Arabic language. Pupils who had not done this are not permitted to start primary school as they will be examined before starting. Pupils' age may sometimes vary seeing that some pupils achieve higher than their predicted grade and may skip the year while some require to repeat the year if they had not achieved the grade required from them. After finishing primary, students move to intermediate school.

==== Tunisia ====
In Tunisia pre-school education (3–6 years) is optional and provided primarily in three settings:

Kindergartens:socio-educational institutions that come under the supervision of Ministry of culture.

Kouttabs:religious institutions also cater for children between 3 and 5 years of age. Their task is to initiate them into learning the Quran as well as reading, writing, and arithmetic. They are under the supervision of the Ministry of Religious Affairs

Preparatory year: It is also an integral part of basic education but it is not compulsory. It is supervised by the Ministry of Education and is provided in public, private and quasi-public primary schools

9 years of basic education are compulsory.

- Kindergarten (optional): 5–6 years
- 1st grade: 6–7 years
- 2nd grade: 7–8 years
- 3rd grade: 8–9 years
- 4th grade: 9–10 years
- 5th grade: 10–11 years
- 6th grade: 11–12 years
- 7th grade: 12–13 years
- 8th grade: 13–14 years
- 9th grade: 14–15 years

=== Asia ===
==== Bangladesh ====
In Bangladesh, students attend primary schools for six years. Primary/secondary education in Bangladesh is segregated as Primary (Pre school 1 Year + Class 1 -5), Junior High School (Class 6 - Class-10) and Higher Secondary or intermediate (11th and 12th Class) are as follows :

- Preschool: 5 years.-6 years. (optional)
- Class 1: 6-7
- Class 2: 7-8
- Class 3: 8-9
- Class 4: 9-10
- Class 5: 10-11

After completing primary education students join junior high school (Class-6 to Class-10) and sit for S.S.C (Secondary school certificate) Exam

- Class 6: 11-12
- Class 7: 12-13
- Class 8: 13-14
- Class 9: 14-15
- Class 10: 15-16

H.S.C (Higher Secondary Certificate)

- Class 11: 16-17
- Class 12: 17-18
- Class 13: 18-19

==== Hong Kong ====
In Hong Kong, students attend primary schools for the first six years of compulsory education.

==== Indonesia ====
The Indonesian term for elementary school is "sekolah dasar" and it consists of six grades.

==== India ====
In India, elementary schools provide education from Class 1 to Class 8. The children in these classes are generally aged between 6 and 15 years. It is the next stage after kindergarten (Pre-Nursery, Nursery, Prep or Lower Kindergarten and Upper Kindergarten). The next stage after primary education is Middle School (Class 7th to 10th). In most schools in North India, children in Classes 1st to 3rd are taught English, Hindi, Mathematics, Environmental Science, and General Knowledge. In class 4th and 5th the environmental science subject is replaced by General Science and Social Studies. However some schools may introduce this concept in Class 3 itself. Some schools may also introduce a third language in Class 6th or even in Class 5th. Sanskrit, French language and local state language are the most common third languages taught in Indian schools. At some places, primary education is labeled as the education of Class 3rd to Class 5th and up to class 2nd as pre-primary education. This is because many new concepts are introduced in this class. Children are taught painting instead of drawing and colouring, exams are taken, and Word Sum Puzzle in maths are introduced along with geometry.

The National Council of Educational Research and Training (NCERT) is the apex body for school education in India. The NCERT provides support and technical assistance to a number of schools in India and oversees many aspects of enforcement of education policies. In India, the various bodies governing school education system are:

- The state government boards, in which the majority of Indian children are enrolled.
- The Central Board of Secondary Education (CBSE) board.
- The Council for the Indian School Certificate Examinations (CISCE) board.
- The National Institute of Open Schooling.
- International schools affiliated to the International Baccalaureate Programme or the Cambridge International Examinations.
- Islamic Madrasah schools, whose boards are controlled by local state governments, or autonomous, or affiliated with Darul Uloom Deoband.
- Autonomous schools like Woodstock School, Auroville, Patha Bhavan and Ananda Marga Gurukula.

Primary/secondary education in India is segregated as Primary (1st standard to 5th standard), Upper Primary (6th standard to 8th standard), Lower Secondary (9th standard to 10th standard), and Higher Secondary (11th and 12th standard).

- Kindergarten: nursery - 3 years, Lower Kindergarten (LKG) - 4 years, Upper Kindergarten (UKG) - 5 years. These are not mandatory as per government rules but are recommended before joining 1st standard.
- 1st Standard: 5 years or 6
- 2nd Standard: 7 years
- 3rd Standard: 8 years
- 4th Standard: 9 years
- 5th Standard: 10 years
- 6th Standard: 11 years
- 7th Standard: 12 years
- 8th Standard: 13 years
- 9th Standard: 14 years
- 10th Standard: 15 years
- 11th Standard: 16 years
- 12th Standard: 17 years

==== Iran ====
There are 6 years of education in primary school from ages 6 to 12 years old (new educational system).

Primary school is required by law in Iran. There are many free public schools for students to attend, and they can also choose to attend private schools with high tuition fees. There are also 'Nemuneh Mardomi' schools, which are considered by some to be better than public schools and they have a lower fee, however they are quite challenging to get accepted into. In order to attend 'Nemuneh Mardomi' schools you must take an entrance exam, which is used to identify the top students. This is a highly competitive and stressful process for students.

==== Israel ====
- Daycare (optional): 4 months-1.5 years
- Preschool: 2 yr.-6 yr. (optional for 2 yr.)
- Kindergarten or Pre-1A: 5-7
- Class 1: 6-7
- Class 2: 7-8
- Class 3: 8-9
- Class 4: 9-10
- Class 5: 10-11
- Class 6: 11-12
- Class 7: 12-13
- Class 8: 13-14
- Class 9: 14-15
- Class 10: 15-16
- Class 11: 16-17
- Class 12: 17-18

Some schools include classes 7 and 8 as elementary school; some include them as high school.

==== Japan ====
Kindergartens nursery schools are private institutions and attendance is not mandatory.

- Nursery School / Kindergarten (Junior): 3- to 4-year-olds
- Nursery School / Kindergarten (Intermediate): 4- to 5-year-olds
- Nursery School / Kindergarten (Senior): 5- to 6-year-olds
- Elementary School Grade 1: 6- to 7-year-olds
- Elementary School Grade 2: 7- to 8-year-olds
- Elementary School Grade 3: 8- to 9-year-olds
- Elementary School Grade 4: 9- to 10-year-olds
- Elementary School Grade 5: 10- to 11-year-olds
- Elementary School Grade 6: 11- to 12-year-olds
- Middle School Grade 1: 12- to 13-year-olds
- Middle School Grade 2: 13- to 14-year-olds
- Middle School Grade 3: 14- to 15-year-olds
- High School Grade 1: 15- to 16-year-olds
- High School Grade 2: 16- 17 to Year-olds
- High School Grade 3: 17- to 18-year-olds

English has become a compulsory subject at primary schools in Japan, since April 2011 in order to compete with other Asian countries in English proficiency; Japanese students have among the lowest English TOEFL scores in Asia.

==== Malaysia ====
In Malaysia, the first six years of compulsory formalised education take place in primary schools, and starts at the age of seven.

Primary education is compulsory in Malaysia. Children spend 6 years in primary schools. In 6th year, students sit for a national standardized test known as the Ujian Pencapaian Sekolah Rendah (UPSR, Primary School Achievement Test).

Level One

Kindergarten: age 5 - 6

- Standard 1: age 7
- Standard 2: age 8
- Standard 3: age 9

Level Two

- Standard 4: age 10
- Standard 5: age 11
- Standard 6: age 12 (UPSR: Ujian Pencapaian Sekolah Rendah or Primary School Achievement Test)

After completing Standard 6, students go on to secondary schools.

Lower Secondary

- Remove Class / Kelas Peralihan : age 13 (optional for Chinese educated students coming into secondary schools so they will be a year older when they start Form 1)
- Form 1: age 13
- Form 2: age 14
- Form 3: age 15(PT3: Pentaksiran Tingkatan 3 or Lower Secondary Evaluation)

Upper Secondary

- Form 4: age 16
- Form 5: age 17 (SPM: Sijil Pelajaran Malaysia or Malaysian Certificate of Education)
- Form 6 (Lower): age 18-19 (optional)
- Form 6 (Upper): age 19-20 (optional)

Next, the students will be moving on into universities or college

==== Pakistan ====
In Pakistan, children aged between 3–6 years begin attending Pre School which is not mandatory but recommended by the government and private education sectors.

The Pre-School is associated with the Early Years of Education (EYE) programme which is basically consists of initial three years of education starting from Play or Pre Nursery Class students age 3+ and Nursery Class Students age 4+ and Prep Class Students age 5+. The most private school have varied classes names for Pre School Classes I-e, Nursery, Kindergarten-1 and Kindergarten-2. Whereas, some other private schools names pre school classes like Nursery, Kindergarten and Prep.

Primary Education is free and mandatory by the Government of Pakistan in the Provincial Government and Federal Government Public Schools. The government obliged parents to enrolled their children in the schools. The student age should be 5 to 6 years when admitted in class 1. Besides Government Schools there are many Private Schools who provide Primary, Secondary and Higher Secondary education at a higher cost.

The Primary education in Pakistan is 5 years of education program starting from Class 1 to 5. The elementary school is called middle school in which classes 6 to 8 are taught. The high school is two years of education called Metric which consists of classes 9th and 10th. The students after passing the 10th year of education from Board of Secondary Education examination (BSEE) OR Secondary School Certificate (SSC) often called out matriculate. The 11th and 12th years of education classes mostly held in Higher Secondary Schools or at Colleges situated in the jurisdiction of the Board Of Intermediate Education (BIE). The classes called 1st Year and 2nd Year of Intermediate level at colleges. After that students are allowed to go to universities for their bachelor's degree in respective subjects.

Class	Age
Play Group	3-4
Nursery	4-5
Reception or Prep	5-6
Class 1	6-7
Class 2	7-8
Class 3	8-9
Class 4	9-10
Class 5	10-11

==== Philippines ====
In the Philippines, the Department of Education mandates that elementary school lasts for 7 years in the public school system starting with Kindergarten and grade 1 and culminating with grade 6. After successful completion of the 7-year programme shall a student graduate, be awarded an elementary diploma and can move-on to a 4-year junior high school programme (most private schools will require an entrance examination). However most private schools (which usually call the elementary level as "grade school"), especially exclusive schools and those accredited to have a high degree of autonomy from the Department of Education usually extend their programmes to 7th grade and can also include levels such as nursery, kindergarten or preparatory (prep) as entry levels prior to 1st grade. Subjects usually taken up include Communication Arts in Mother Tongue (until Grade 3), English (some private schools break this down into Language and Reading) and Filipino, Mathematics, Science, Social Studies (taught in Mother Tongue from Grade 1-Grade 3, Filipino in Grades 4-6), Music, Art, Physical Education and Health (collectively known as MAPEH), Values Education and Technology and Livelihood Education (TLE). Students in the 6th grade, whether studying in a public or private school are required to undergo a National (Elementary) Achievement Test (NAT) even if grade 6 isn't the terminal level in that school. The NAT is similar to certain schemes like Primary School Leaving Examination of Singapore (PSLE) except that that NAT score isn't used as a basis to admit students to a high school. Kindergarten, Grade 1 to Grade 6 are affected with the K-12 education.

==== Saudi Arabia ====
The Saudi Arabian term for elementary school is المدرسة الابتدائية, consisting of students from ages 6 to 12.

==== Singapore ====
The medium of instruction is English. After completing kindergarten, or pre-school years, children will then have to go through 6 years of compulsory primary education, from ages 7 to 12. At the end of primary education, students are required to take a standardised national exam, the Primary School Leaving Examination (also known as PSLE). Based on PSLE results, students apply and are sorted into secondary schools for a 4 or 5-year course.

Primary education in Singapore, normally starting at age seven, is a four-year foundation stage (Primary 1 to 4) and a two-year orientation stage (Primary 5 to 6). Primary education is compulsory and fees are low at public schools, there are also other fees per student to help cover miscellaneous costs.

During the foundation stage, all students are taught English Language as a first language, a mother tongue as a second language and Mathematics. Science is introduced from Primary 3 onwards. In addition to these examinable subjects, lessons in Civics and Moral Education, arts and crafts, music, health education, social studies and physical education are conducted at various levels. Students are also introduced to project work, receive pastoral care and career guidance, and are to participate in Co-Curricular Activities and Community Involvement Programmes. In the orientation stage, weaker students are banded based on their abilities in the four examinable subjects. Known as "subject-based banding", they take individual subjects either at the standard or foundation level. Conversely, higher mother tongue is offered for students with higher ability.

==== South Korea ====
In South Korea, students attend elementary school from kindergarten to the 6th grade. Students study a wide range of subjects, including: Korean, English, Chinese characters, math, social studies, science, computers, art, physical education, music, health, ethics, and home economics. English instruction generally begins in the 3rd grade. After finishing elementary school, students attend middle school (middle school 1st–3rd grade). The Korean term for elementary school is chodeung hakgyo (Korean: 초등학교).

==== Syria ====
9 years of primary school are compulsory.

Kindergarten (optional): 5–6 years

- 1st grade: 6–7 years
- 2nd grade: 7–8 years
- 3rd grade: 8–9 years
- 4th grade: 9–10 years
- 5th grade: 10–11 years
- 6th grade: 11–12 years
- 7th grade: 12–13 years
- 8th grade: 13–14 years
- 9th grade: 14–15 years

==== Turkey ====
Primary Education in Turkey

==== Vietnam ====
Children normally start primary education at the age of six. Education at this level lasts for 5 years and is compulsory for all children. The country's literacy rate is over 90%.

According to the Multiple Indicators Cluster Survey 2006 of Vietnam's General Statistics Office, 96% of six to 11-year-old children enrolled in primary school. However, there was still a significant disparity in the primary education completion rate among different ethnicity. While primary completion rate for Kinh students was 86%, the rate for ethnic minority children was only 61%.

In school year 2009-2010, Vietnam had 15,172 primary schools and 611 combined primary and lower secondary schools. The total enrollment was 7.02 million pupils, of whom 46% were girls.

The renovated primary education curriculum in Vietnam is divided into two phases as follows:

- Phase 1 includes Grades 1, 2 and 3 with 6 subjects: Vietnamese Language, Mathematics, Morality, Nature and Society, Arts and Physical Education.
- Phase 2 includes Grades 4 and 5 with 9 subjects: Vietnamese Language, Mathematics, Morality, Science, History, Geography, Basic Techniques, Music, Arts and Physical Education.

=== Oceania ===
==== Australia ====
In Australia, students undertake preschool then 13 years of schooling before moving to vocational or higher education. Primary schooling for most children starts after they turn 5 years old. In most states, children can be enrolled earlier at the discretion of individual school principals on the basis of intellectual giftedness. In Victoria, New South Wales, Queensland, the Northern Territory, the ACT and Tasmania students then move through Kindergarten/Preparatory School/Reception and Years 1 to 6 before starting high school. In South Australia and Western Australia students do Year 7 while still enrolled at primary school, although most governmental primary schools are moving to a K to 6 structure to line up with the other states in order to ensure that Year 7 students are able to undertake laboratory practical components of the national syllabus.

- Pre-School/Kindergarten: 4 to 5 years old
- Prep./Pre-Primary: 5 to 6 years old
- Grade/Year 1: 6 to 7 years old
- Grade/Year 2: 7 to 8 years old
- Grade/Year 3: 8 to 9 years old
- Grade/Year 4: 9 to 10 years old
- Grade/Year 5: 10 to 11 years old
- Grade/Year 6: 11 to 12 years old
- Grade/Year 7: 12 to 13 years old (SA)

=== Europe ===
==== Denmark ====
In Denmark, 0 - 9 grade is compulsory primary education.

Most children are pupils in the Danish "Folkeskolen", which has the current grades: Kindergarten (optional): 3–6 years

- 0th grade: 5–7 years
- 1st grade: 6–8 years
- 2nd grade: 7–9 years
- 3rd grade: 8–10 years
- 4th grade: 9–11 years
- 5th grade: 10–12 years
- 6th grade: 11–13 years
- 7th grade: 12–14 years
- 8th grade: 13–15 years
- 9th grade: 14–16 years

10th grade (optional): 15–18 years

==== Estonia ====
In Estonia, 9 years of primary school (Põhikool or "basic school") are compulsory. The first three grades of primary school are called Algkool which can be translated as "beginning school" and can be confused with primary school. In some low density population areas Algkool is the only school available and students enter primary school in bigger towns.

- 1st grade: 7–8 years
- 2nd grade: 8–9 years
- 3rd grade: 9–10 years
- 4th grade: 10–11 years
- 5th grade: 11–12 years
- 6th grade: 12–13 years
- 7th grade: 13–14 years
- 8th grade: 14–15 years
- 9th grade: 15–16 years

==== Finland ====
9 years of primary school (Peruskoulu) are compulsory.

- Preschool (optional): 5–6 years
- 1st grade: 6–7 years
- 2nd grade: 7–8 years
- 3rd grade: 8–9 years
- 4th grade: 9–10 years
- 5th grade: 10–11 years
- 6th grade: 11–12 years
- 7th grade: 12–13 years
- 8th grade: 13–14 years
- 9th grade: 14–15 years
- 10th grade (optional): 15–16 years

==== France ====
In France, primary schools provide education from the age of 6 to 11. The students start in CP (cours préparatoire) then past in CE1, CE2 (cours élémentaires), CM1 and finally CM2 (cours moyens). Before 1941 primary schools had upper sections called ecoles primaires supérieures, which spanned on four years and enabled students to enter normal schools or clerking professions; such sections were turned into Lycées but cours complementaires remained until 1959, when such courses were turned into collèges d'enseignement généraux.

Education is mandatory from 6 years old to 16 years old. Free public and free private education is offered from 3 years old (sometimes 2 years old). Home education is allowed. Occasionally classes are of a double level to make up the number of pupil per class, usually to 29.

Pré-élémentaire (day care)

- garderie (day care)
- crèche (0–3 years old)
- Élémentaire

École maternelle (pre-school)

- Cycle I
- toute petite section (2–3 years old) (rare)
- petite section (3-4 years old)
- moyenne section (4-5 years old)
- grande section (5-6 years old)

École primaire (primary/elementary)

- Cycle II
- CP (cours préparatoire) (6–7 years old) (may be tried a second time (7–8 years old) if reading and writing are not learned the first time)
- CE1 (cours élémentaire 1) (7–8 years old)
- CE2 (cours élémentaire 2) (8–9 years old)
- Cycle III
- CM1 (cours moyen 1) (9–10 years old)
- CM2 (cours moyen 2) (10–11 years old)

==== Germany ====
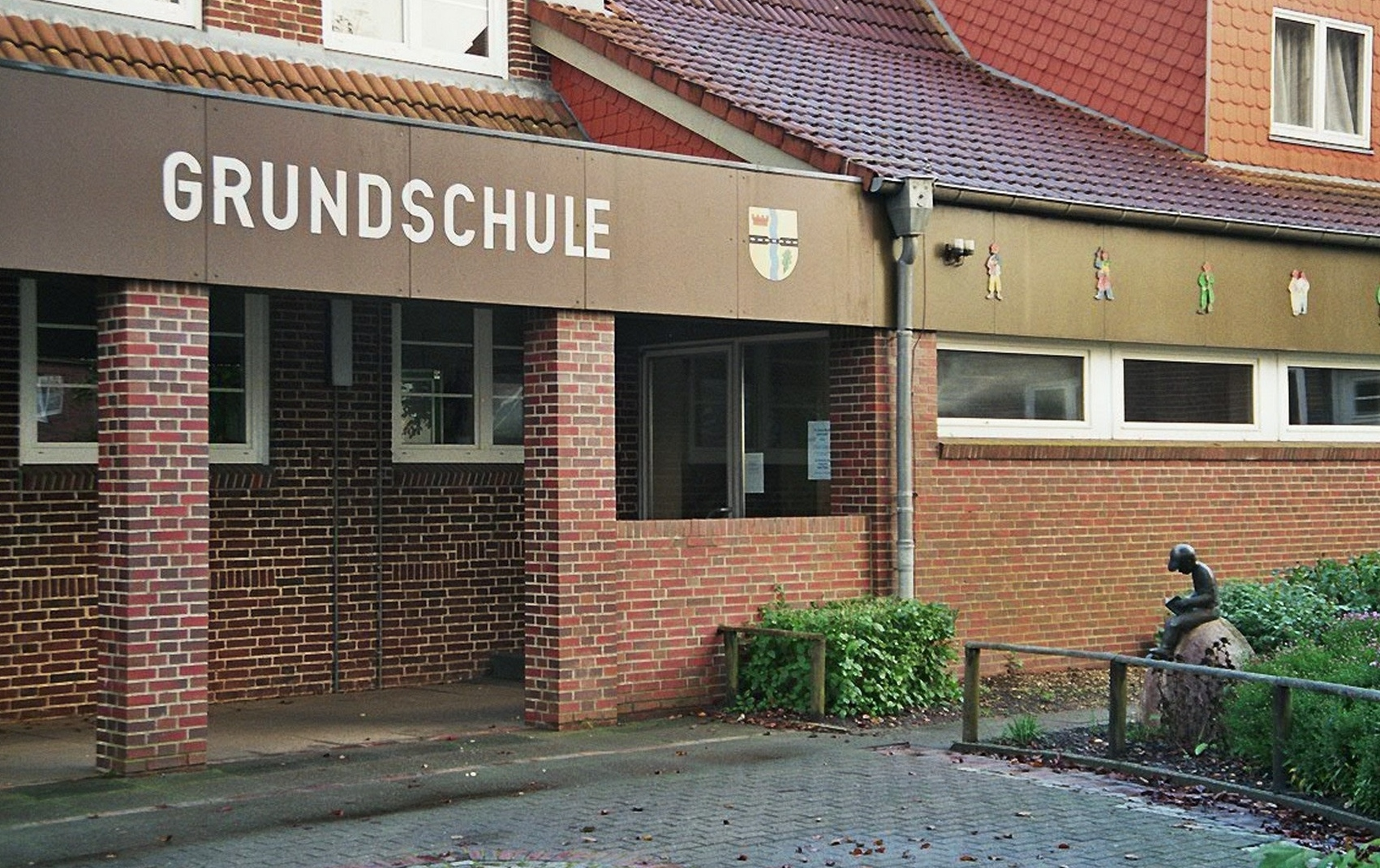
Elementary school ("Grundschule") in Treia Schleswig-Holstein.

Depending on the federal state, primary schools provide education from Class 1 to Class 4 or from Class 1 to Class 6. After primary school students may attend a Hauptschule, Mittelschule, Regionale Schule or a Realschule, which are more vocationally orientated, a Gymnasium, which is more academically oriented, or a Gesamtschule, which is comparable to a Comprehensive School.

The first school for German children is called Grundschule. It takes usually four years, the pupils are between six and ten years old. The education consists of learning to read, write, basic math and general knowledge. In some schools, a first foreign language is introduced, usually English. In the final year of primary school, children receive a recommendation as to which further school they can attend.

- Kindergarten: 3–6 years
- Grade 1: 6–7 years
- Grade 2: 7–8 years
- Grade 3: 8–9 years
- Grade 4: 9–10 years
- Grade 5: 10–11 years (Berlin and Brandenburg only)
- Grade 6: 11–12 years (Berlin and Brandenburg only)

Depending on the recommendation they received from their teacher, children proceed to their mandatory secondary education in either Hauptschule (Grades 5-9, sometimes 10th grade is added which is then called "Werkrealschule"), Realschule (Grades 5-10), or Gymnasium (Grades 5-12/13). Upon the successful completion of Grades 11, 12 and 13, depending on the federal state, in the Gymnasium, students receive the Abitur, a diploma with the permission to enter post-secondary education (similar to the A-level or High School Diploma). The Abitur will not be received at the end of Haupt- and Realschule, but graduating students are eligible to enter the 10th Grade of the Realschule or the 11th Grade of the Gymnasium respectively if they wish to obtain the Abitur.

==== Hungary ====
Primary school education for children in Hungary takes 8 years.

- 1st grade: 6–7 years
- 2nd grade: 7–8 years
- 3rd grade: 8–9 years
- 4th grade: 9–10 years
- 5th grade: 10–11 years
- 6th grade: 11–12 years
- 7th grade: 12–13 years
- 8th grade: 13–14 years

==== Iceland ====
In Iceland, 10 years of primary school (Grunnskóli) are compulsory.

Primary school teaching in Iceland consists of 10 grade levels. These are:

- 1st grade: 6–7 years
- 2nd grade: 7–8 years
- 3rd grade: 8–9 years
- 4th grade: 9–10 years
- 5th grade: 10–11 years
- 6th grade: 11–12 years
- 7th grade: 12–13 years
- 8th grade: 13–14 years
- 9th grade: 14–15 years
- 10th grade: 15–16 years

==== Ireland ====
Primary school teaching in Ireland consists of 8 class levels. These are:

- Junior Infants (4–5 years)
- Senior Infants (5–6 years)
- 1st class (Rang a haon, 6–7 years)
- 2nd class (Rang a dó, 7–8 years)
- 3rd class (Rang a trí, 8–9 years)
- 4th class (Rang a ceathair, 9–10 years)
- 5th class (Rang a cúig, 10–11 years)
- 6th class (Rang a sé, 11–12 years)

Junior and Senior infants correspond to Kindergarten.

The subjects mainly taught in primary school are:

- English (Béarla, Spellings are taught more in Primary education, not taught in Secondary although if you make a spelling mistake in Secondary English work, you would be corrected)
- Maths (Mata)
- Irish (Gaeilge)
- Modern European language (i.e. French or/and German) (very rarely)
- History (Stair)
- Geography (Tíreolaíocht/Tír Eolas, direct translation "Country-science/Country information")
- Science (Eolaíocht)
- PE (Physical Education) (Corpoideachas, direct translation "Body education")
- Art (Ealaín)
- Drama (Drámaíocht)
- Music (Ceol)
- SPHE (Social, Personal, Health Education) (OSPS, Oideachas Sóisialta, Pearsanta, Sláintiúil)
- Religion (Reiligiún/Creideamh)

Secondary school teaching in Ireland consists of 6 class levels. These are:

- 1st year (12–13 years)
- 2nd year (13–14 years)
- 3rd year (14–15 years)
- 4th year/Transition Year(TY) (15–16 years) This year is optional.
- 5th year (16–17 years)
- 6th year (17–18 years)

The content of the Religion course taught depends on the management of the school. Many schools are managed and owned by the Roman Catholic Church, with a lesser number belonging to the Church of Ireland and to the Multi Denominational Group Educate Together and a handful run by other religions such as Muslims. Each school body decides on the emphasis of its religious instruction. In Catholic schools 2nd and 6th class prepare children for Holy Communion and Confirmation respectively. In the Church of Ireland this preparation is done when the pupil is aged about 14 years, and is in secondary school.

Children may start at primary school at any age between four and six years of age. Most children finish primary school at or around twelve years of age.

==== Italy ====
Primary school teaching in Italy consists of 5 grades. Before the First Grade, there is the kindergarten (scuola dell'infanzia in Italian), which is not compulsory and lasts 3 years.

- First grade (6–7 years)
- Second grade (7–8 years)
- Third grade (8–9 years)
- Fourth grade (9–10 years)
- Fifth grade (10–11 years)

Schools used to have a six-day school week, Monday to Saturday. Lately, as of 2008, most elementary and middle schools have reduced the school week to five days, with high schools remaining with six.

==== Latvia ====
Basic education (primary education) in Latvia goes from ages 7 to 16 years old and include grades 1 through 9. Primary education is mandatory and free of cost for students. The purpose of basic education (primary education) in Latvia is to provide students with the basic knowledge and skills that are needed for their everyday lives. It also provides the groundwork needed for further education. Every citizen of Latvia has rights to an education. The educational system includes three different levels, national, municipal, and institutional. Basic education is funded by the national or municipal budget. The 10 point grading system that is used starting in grade 2 goes in the order from the highest being outstanding (10.00), excellent (9.00-9.99), very good (8.00-8.99), good (7.00-7.99), almost good (6.00-6.99), satisfactory (5.00-5.99), almost satisfactory (4.00-4.99), and unsatisfactory (1.00-3.99). In first grade students are assessed on knowledge and skills and they are graded in a descriptive way rather than using marks. In second and third grade students are assessed on subjects including Latvian language, minority language, math, and foreign languages and are graded using the 10 point scale. In fourth grade through ninth grade students begin being assessed in all subject areas and are graded using the 10 point scale. When students complete their 9 years of basic education they take a centralized national exam, which qualifies them for further education.

==== Netherlands ====
Children in the Netherlands must be at least four years old to enter primary education. Almost all 4-year-olds (99.3%) in the Netherlands indeed attend primary school, although this is not compulsory until children reach the age of 5. Primary school is free of charge. In most schools, children are grouped by age in mixed ability classes, with one teacher for all subjects. Primary school consists of 8 groups (thus 8 years of schooling). During the first two years (both kindergarten), children receive an average of 22 hours of education, during the last 6 years children receive an average of 25 hours per week. Schools are open 5 days a week, but all children have a half day on Wednesdays (ending at noon). At the end of primary school, in group 8, schools advise on secondary school choice. Most schools use a national test to support this advice, for instance the 'Citotoets', a test developed by the Central Institute for Test development.

- group 1: age 4-5 (kindergarten)
- group 2: age 5-6 (kindergarten)
- group 3: age 6-7 (school curriculum starts with writing, reading, etc.)
- group 4: age 7-8
- group 5: age 8-9
- group 6: age 9-10
- group 7: age 10-11
- group 8: age 11-12 (last school year with advice on secondary school choice)

==== Poland ====
Primary school:

- 0th - 6–7 years old
- 1st - 7–8 years old
- 2nd - 8–9 years old
- 3rd - 9–10 years old
- 4th - 10–11 years old
- 5th - 11–12 years old
- 6th - 12–13 years old
- 7th - 13–14 years old
- 8th - 14–15 years old

Middle school: Middle schools have been liquidated since the 1st of September 2019. Before the liquidation took place, they lasted 3 years.

Secondary school:

- 1st 15–16 years old (Vocational School, Liceum and Technikum)
- 2nd 16–17 years old (Vocational School, Liceum and Technikum)
- 3rd 17–18 years old (Vocational School, Liceum and Technikum)*
- 4th 18–19 years old (Vocational School, Liceum and Technikum)
- 5th 19–20 years old (only in Technikum)

Higher education: Children older than 18 may end their schooling after passing secondary school if desired.

==== Portugal ====
In Portugal, the primary education (ensino primário) is known as the 1st cycle of the basic education (1º ciclo do ensino básico). It includes the first four years of compulsory education (1° ano, 2° ano, 3° ano and 4° ano), their pupils being children between six and ten years old. After the education reform of 1986, the former primary education became part of the basic education (educação básica).

Basic education now includes:

- 1st cycle (1º ciclo) - former primary education
  - 1st year (6–7 years old)
  - 2nd year (7–8 years old)
  - 3rd year (8–9 years old)
  - 4th year (9–10 years old)
- 2nd cycle (2º ciclo) - former preparatory education
  - 5th year (10–11 years old)
  - 6th year (11–12 years old)
- 3rd cycle (3º ciclo) - former preparatory education (continuation)
  - 7th year (12–13 years old)
  - 8th year (13–14 years old)
  - 9th year (14–15 years old)

==== Spain ====
Primary education in Spain lasts for six academic years and includes students ages 6 to 12 years old. Students learn cognitive and social development in primary school. There are three different types of schools that students can attend, public schools (state-funded), private schools (privately funded), and semi-private schools (state and privately funded). The length of the academic day differs depending on the type school. Some school days go from 9:00 in the morning to 5:00 in the evening and students get a two-hour lunch break from 1:00 to 3:00 in the afternoon. Other schools start at 9:00 in the morning and end at 2:00 in the afternoon. Education in Spain is required by law between the ages of 3 and 16 years old. It is state funded, but parents are responsible for buying the materials needed for their children's education.

==== Sweden ====
Most children attend a preparatory year at the age of 6 even if this initial year is not mandatory. Children then kids go to the primary school (grundskola) through the ages of 7 and 15. After that they can choose to (although it is very uncommon not to) study at a gymnasium for three years where they pick a program devoted to a particular direction (i.e. Science, Aesthetics, Civics). During the gymnasium all students have some subjects they have to study, but not during all three years.

The children doesn't start receiving grades until their sixth year. There is, however, proposals to change this to the fourth year. Swedish government

- Pre-school class (compulsory since 2018), age 6
- Grundskola
  - Lågstadium
    - Year 1, age 7
    - Year 2, age 8
    - Year 3, age 9
  - Mellanstadium
    - Year 4, age 10
    - Year 5, age 11
    - Year 6, age 12
  - Högstadium
    - Year 7, age 13
    - Year 8, age 14
    - Year 9, age 15
- Gymnasieskola (not compulsory), age 16-18

Gymnasieskola is not compulsory but most common. Completely driven by personal preference, and whether the student has achieved the right grades for desired education. If number of students exceeds available spots, those with the highest grades shall then be firstly accepted. This is either a preparation for university or for work.

During the year before children start compulsory school, all children are offered a place in a pre-school class (förskoleklass), which combines the pedagogical methods of the pre-school with those of compulsory school. Between ages 7 and 15, children attend compulsory comprehensive school (grundskola), divided in three stages. The vast majority of schools in Sweden are municipally run, but there are also independent schools. The education in independent schools has many objectives in common with the municipal school, but it can have an orientation that differs from that of the municipal schools.

==== United Kingdom ====
Elementary schools in England and Wales were publicly funded schools which provided a basic standard of education for children aged from six to 14 between 1870 and 1944. These were set up to enable children to receive manual training and elementary instruction and provided a restricted curriculum with the emphasis on reading, writing and arithmetic (the three Rs). The schools operated on a 'monitorial' system, whereby one teacher supervised a large class with the assistance of a team of monitors, who were quite often older pupils. Elementary school teachers were paid by results. Their pupils were expected to achieve precise standards in reading, writing and arithmetic such as reading a short paragraph in a newspaper, writing from dictation, and working out sums and fractions.

Before 1944 around 80 per cent of the school population attended elementary schools through to the age of 14. The remainder transferred either to secondary school or junior technical school at age 11. The school system was changed with the introduction of the Education Act 1944. Education was restructured into three progressive stages which were known as primary education, secondary education and further education.

In the UK, schools providing primary education are now known as primary schools. They generally cater for children aged from four to eleven (Reception to Year Six or in Northern Ireland and Scotland P1 to P7). Primary schools are often subdivided into infant schools for children from four to seven and junior schools for ages seven to 11. In the (diminishing) minority of areas where there is a "three-tier" system, children go to lower school or "first school" until about 9, then middle school until about 13, then upper school; in these places, the term "primary school" is not usually used.

In the UK schools providing primary education in the state sector are known as primary schools. They generally cater for children aged from four to eleven (Reception to Year Six; in Northern Ireland and Scotland Primary One to Primary Seven).

In areas that adopted a three-tier system, the term primary school is often used as an alternative to First School, taking in ages up to 9 or 10 years old, although for education planning purposes, the term "primary education" in these areas will still cover the age groups as in a two-tier system.

In the private sector, fee-paying schools which provide primary education are known as preparatory schools, and they often cater for children up to the age of thirteen. As their name suggests, preparatory schools are designed to prepare pupils for entrance examinations for fee-paying private schools.

==== England ====
Children start school either in the year or the term in which they reach five depending upon the policy of the Local Education Authority. All state schools are obligated to follow a centralized National Curriculum. The primary school years are split into Key Stages:

- Nursery, age 1 to 4
- Reception, age 4 to 5 (Pre-K)
- Year 1, age 5 to 6. (Kindergarten)
- Year 2, age 6 to 7 (1st grade)
- Year 3, age 7 to 8 (2nd grade)
- Year 4, age 8 to 9 (3rd grade)
- Year 5, age 9 to 10 (4th grade)
- Year 6, age 10 to 11 (5th grade)

At the end of Year 6 all children in state primary schools are required to take National Curriculum tests in reading and maths also called SATS.

They then change schools to go to secondary school.

- Year 7, age 11 to 12 (6th grade)
- Year 8, age 12 to 13 (7th grade)
- Year 9, age 13 to 14 (8th grade)
- Year 10, age 14 to 15 (9th grade)
- Year 11, age 15 to 16 (10th grade)
- Year 12 (6th form), 16 to 17 (11th grade)
- Year 13 (6th form), 17 to 18 (12th grade)

==== Northern Ireland ====
Children start school either in the year or the term in which they reach four. All state schools are obliged to follow a centralised National Curriculum. The primary school years are split into Key Stages:

- Primary education
  - Primary school
    - Foundation Stage
      - Primary 1, age 4 to 5
      - Primary 2, age 5 to 6
    - Key Stage 1
      - Primary 3, age 6 to 7
      - Primary 4, age 7 to 8
    - Key Stage 2
      - Primary 5, age 8 to 9
      - Primary 6, age 9 to 10
      - Primary 7, age 10 to 11 (Transfer procedure exams to determine secondary school placement.)

At the end of Key Stage 2 in P7, all children are offered the voluntary 11-plus (also called the transfer procedure) examinations, though the parents of thirty percent of children elect not to, and send their kids to secondary schools instead of grammar schools.

All state primary schools are under the jurisdiction of the Department of Education.

==== Scotland ====
In Scotland children typically spend seven years in a primary school, whose years are named P1 to P7. Children enter P1 at the age of four or five (according to a combination of birth date and parental choice); for example, if your birthday is between 1 March 2015 and 29 February 2016, then you would generally start Primary 1 in August 2020.

Primary Education

- Primary 1 (aged 4–5)
- Primary 2 (aged 5–6)
- Primary 3 (aged 6–7)
- Primary 4 (aged 7–8)
- Primary 5 (aged 8–9)
- Primary 6 (aged 9–10)
- Primary 7 (aged 10–11)

Secondary Education

- 1st year - aged 11 to 12
- 2nd year - aged 12 to 13
- 3rd year - aged 13 to 14
- 4th year - aged 14 to 15
- 5th year - aged 15 to 16
- 6th year - aged 16 to 17

==== Wales ====
Age groups in Welsh primary schools are the same as in England. Schools follow the Curriculum for Wales.

=== North America ===
==== Canada ====
In Canada, primary school (also referred to as elementary school) usually begins at ages three or four, starting with either Kindergarten or Grade 1 and lasts until age 11 or 12. Many places in Canada have a split between primary and elementary schools.

In Nova Scotia "elementary school" is the most common term. The provincial government of Nova Scotia uses the term "Primary" instead of Kindergarten.

- Preschool or Early Childhood Education (ECE) (Ages 2–4) *
- Pre-kindergarten (Pre-K) (Ages 4–5) *
- Kindergarten (Ages 5–6) *
- Grade 1 (Ages 6–7) ** Quebec must be 6 to attend grade 1
- Grade 2 (Ages 7–8)
- Grade 3 (Ages 8–9)
- Grade 4 (Ages 9–10)
- Grade 5 (Ages 10–11)
- Grade 6 (Ages 11–12)
- Grade 7 (Ages 12–13) ** Quebec, 1e secondaire
- Grade 8 (Ages 13–14) ** Quebec, 2e secondaire
- Grade 9 (Ages 14–15) ** Quebec, 3e secondaire
- Grade 10 (Ages 15–16) ** Quebec, 4e secondaire
- Grade 11 (Ages 16–17) ** Quebec, 5e secondaire
- Grade 12 (Ages 17–18) ** Quebec, 1st college GEGEP
- Grade 13 (Ages 18–19) ** Some provinces like Ontario have a prep year before attending university.
- CEGEP (ages 18–20) ** Quebec only (prep years to university, or professional)

* Students in the Prairie Provinces are not required by statute to attend pre-kindergarten or kindergarten.

==== Costa Rica ====
Costa Rica has the highest ranked education system in Latin America. Primary education in Costa Rica is required by law for most children in the country between the ages of 6 and 13. Because of this, their literacy is 98% which is one of the highest in Latin America. Primary education starts in first grade and goes through sixth grade. Education is generally free to students.

==== Mexico ====
The education system enrollment in Mexico has continued growing throughout the years. With this, Mexico schooling systems need to come up with different ways to manage and expand access to schooling in order to accommodate their growing enrollment. They also need to make sure they providing high-quality education to students. Mexico's primary schools include grades one through six and are both state and federally funded. Their school year usually goes from August to June. They have a morning session that goes from 7:30 am to 12:30 pm and an afternoon session that goes from 1:30 pm to 6:30 pm. Breakfast is served in some primary schools, but lunch is not provided. In grades three through six students need to pass all of their subjects as well as an end of course exam in order to move up to the next grade level. The curriculum that is covered in Mexico's primary schools includes Spanish plus an additional language like English, math, geography, civics and ethics, physical education, and art.

==== United States ====
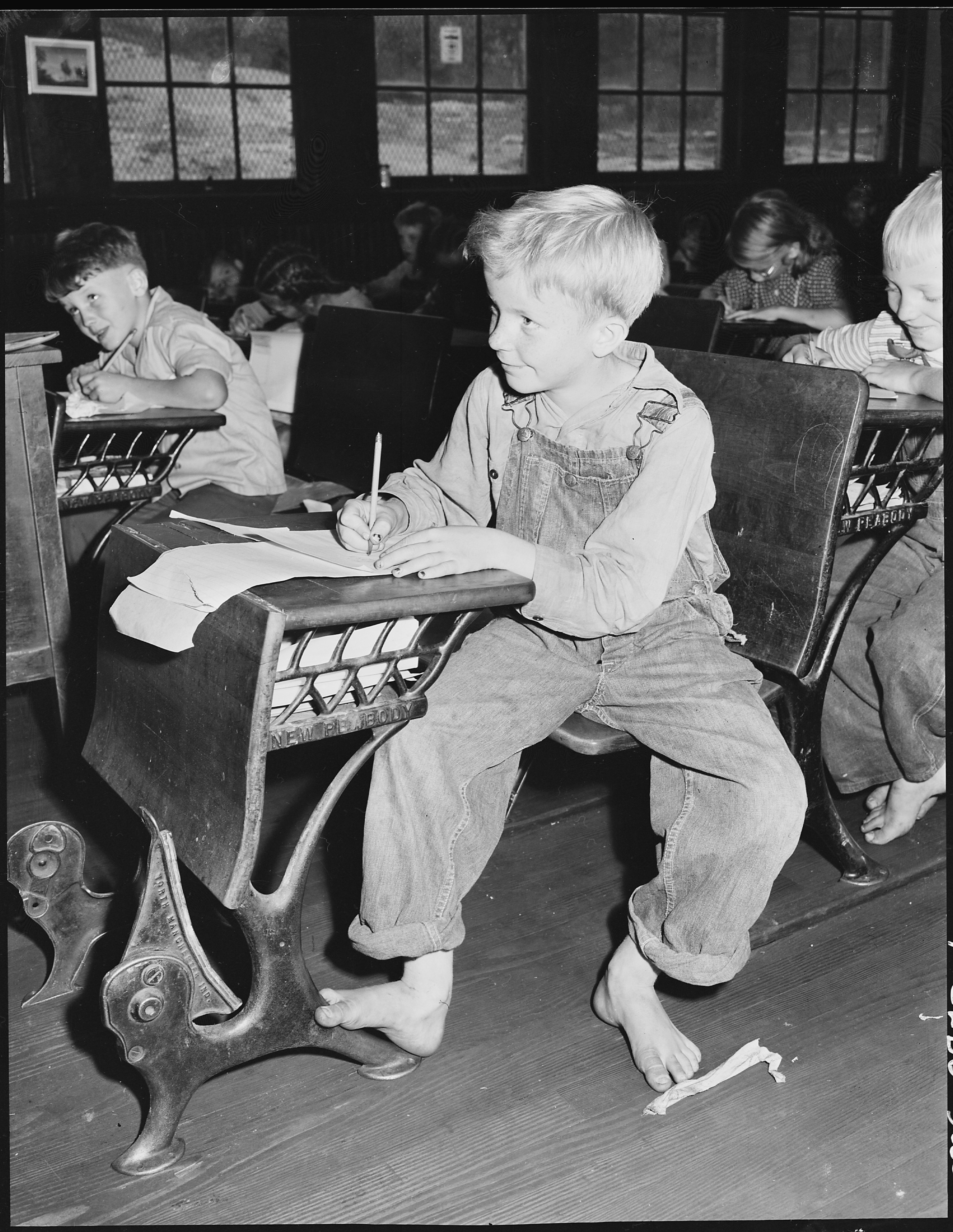
Elementary school in Kentucky, 1946

In the United States, authority to regulate education resides constitutionally with the individual states. The direct authority of the U.S. Congress and the federal U.S. Department of Education is essentially limited to regulation and enforcement of federal constitutional rights. Great indirect authority is exercised through federal funding of national programs and block grants; but there is no obligation upon any state to accept these funds, and the U.S. government otherwise may propose but not enforce national goals, objectives and standards, which generally lie beyond its jurisdiction.

Nevertheless, education has had a relatively consistent evolution throughout the United States. All states have historically made a distinction between two genres of K-12 education and three genres of K-12 school. The genres of education are primary and secondary; and the genres of school are elementary school (Primary school uses the common term as well), middle or junior high school, and high school (historically, "senior" high school to distinguish it from the junior school).

Primary education (or "primary school" meaning "primary education") still tends to focus on basic academic learning and socialization skills, introducing children to the broad range of knowledge, skill and behavioral adjustment they need to succeed in life - and, particularly, in secondary school. Secondary education or secondary school has always focused on preparing adolescents for higher education or/and for careers in industries, trades or professions that do not require an academic degree.

Over the past few decades, schools in the USA have been testing various arrangements which break from the one-teacher, one-class model. Multi-age programs, where children in different grades (e.g. Kindergarten through to second grade) share the same classroom and teachers, is one increasingly popular alternative to traditional elementary instruction. Another alternative is that children might have a main class and go to another teacher's room for one subject, such as science, while the science teacher's main class will go to the other teacher's room for another subject, such as social studies. This could be called a two-teacher, or a rotation. It is similar to the concept of teams in junior high school. Another method is to have the children have one set of classroom teachers in the first half of the year, and a different set of classroom teachers in the second half of the year. Primary School is also known as Elementary school.

41 of the states are now using the Common Core Standards which claim to better prepare students for college and career.

- Pre-Kindergarten/Early Childhood (Ages 2–5)
- Kindergarten (Ages 4–6)
- First grade (6–7 years)
- Second grade (7–8 years)
- Third grade (8–9 years)
- Fourth grade (9–10 years)
- Fifth grade (10–11 years)
- Sixth grade (11–12 years)
- Seventh grade (12–13 years)
- Eighth grade (13–14 years)
- Ninth grade/Freshmen (14–15 years)
- Tenth grade/Sophomore (15–16 years)
- Eleventh grade/Juniors (16–17 years)
- Twelfth grade/Seniors (17–18 years)

=== South America ===
==== Brazil ====
Brazil has recently gone through changes in school grades. Currently, at the age of 6 children attend from the grade 1 to 4 what is called Ensino Primário (Portuguese for Primary Teaching, or Primary School), and afterwards from grade 5 to 9 the Ensino Fundamental (Fundamental Teaching/School). At the age of 15 the teenagers go to Ensino Médio (Mid Teaching/School), which is equivalent High School in other countries, but it is only 3 years long (grades 10 to 12) and can either be a regular or technical course.

Primary school is mandatory and consists in nine years called Ensino Fundamental, separated into Ensino Fundamental I (1st to 5th grades) and Ensino Fundamental II (6th to 9th grades).

- 1st grade: 6 to 7 years old (former pre-school);
- 2nd grade: 7 to 8 years old
- 3rd grade: 8 to 9 years old
- 4th grade: 9 to 10 years old
- 5th grade: 10 to 11 years old
- 6th grade: 11 to 12 years old
- 7th grade: 12 to 13 years old
- 8th grade: 13 to 14 years old
- 9th grade: 14 to 15 years old

Primary school is followed by the optional three years called Ensino Médio (former Científico, Liceu or Ginásio).

- 1st grade: 15- to 16-year-olds
- 2nd grade: 16- to 17-year-olds
- 3rd grade: 17- to 18-year-olds

== See also ==
- Education Index
- List of education articles by country
- List of schools by country
- The New England Primer 1620-1720

== Bibliography ==
- India 2009: A Reference Annual (53rd edition), New Delhi: Additional Director General (ADG), Publications Division, Ministry of Information and Broadcasting, Government of India.
