= State-funded schools (England) =

School which provides free education to pupils

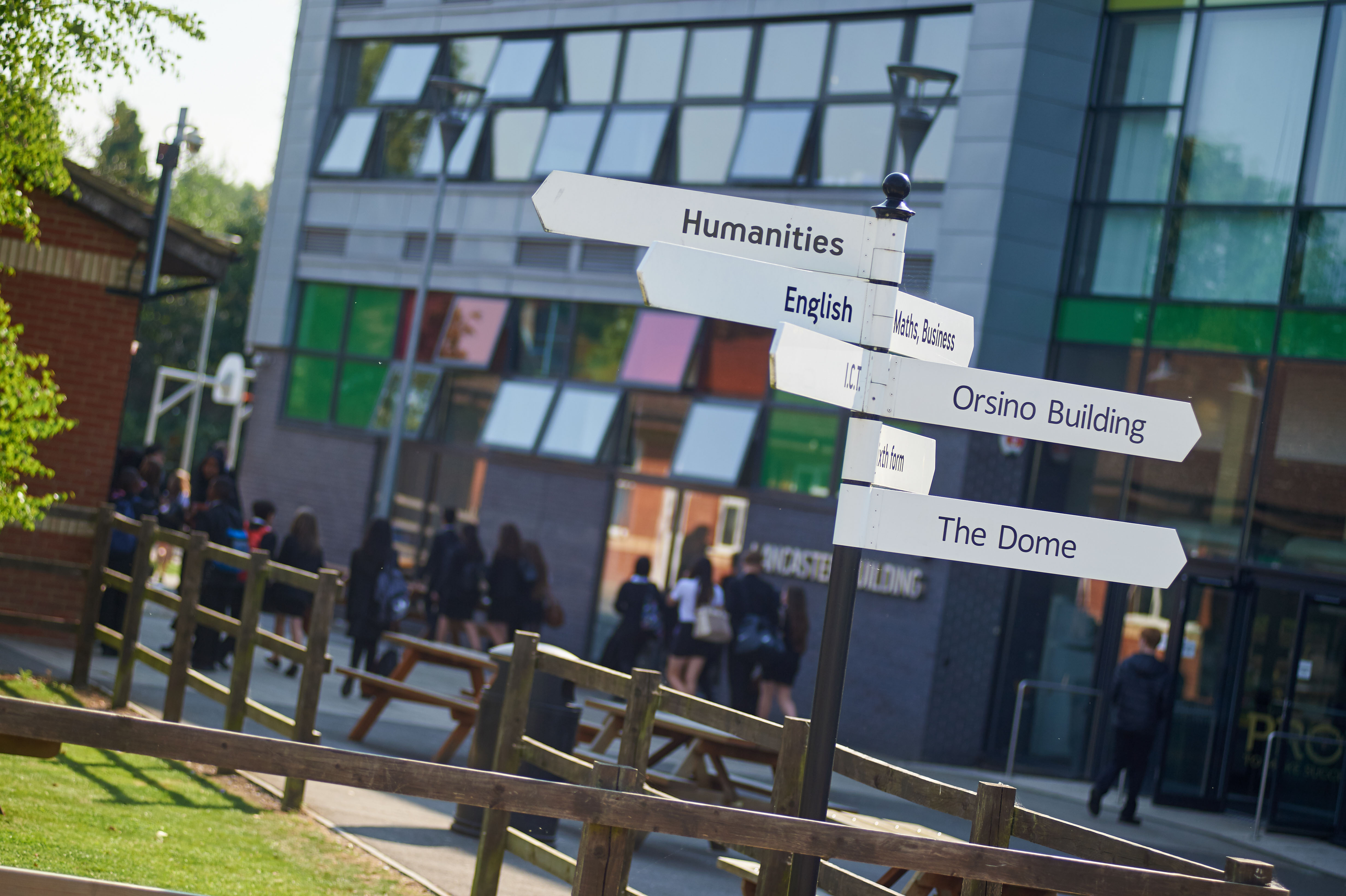
Uxbridge High School is a mixed secondary school with academy status in West London.

English state-funded schools, commonly known as state schools, provide education to pupils between the ages of 3 and 18 without charge. Approximately 93% of English schoolchildren attend 24,000 such schools. Since 2008 about 75% have attained "academy status", which essentially gives them a higher budget per pupil from the Department for Education.

There are a number of categories of English state-funded schools including academy schools, community schools, faith schools, foundation schools, grammar schools, free schools (including studio schools, maths schools and university technical colleges), and a small number of state boarding schools and City Technology Colleges.

About one third of English state-funded schools are faith schools; i.e. affiliated with religious groups, most often from the Church of England (approximately 2/3 of faith schools), or the Roman Catholic Church (around 3/10). There are also schools affiliated to other religions; in 2011, there were 42 Jewish, 12 Muslim, 3 Sikh and 1 Hindu faith schools. These faith schools include sub-categories such as faith-academy schools, voluntary aided schools, and voluntary controlled schools: most voluntary controlled schools are faith schools.

All of these are funded through national and local taxation. A number of state-funded secondary schools are specialist schools, receiving extra funding to develop one or more subjects in which the school specialises, such as Cirencester Deer Park School which currently has 5 specialisms. State schools may request payment from parents for extracurricular activities such as swimming lessons and field trips, provided these charges are voluntary.

== History ==
Until 1870 all schools were charitable or private institutions, but in that year the Elementary Education Act 1870 (33 & 34 Vict. c. 75) permitted local governments to complement the existing elementary schools, to fill up any gaps. The Education Act 1902 allowed local authorities to create secondary schools. The Education Act 1918 abolished fees for elementary schools.

This table gives a simplified overview of how the compulsory provision of education by the state (yellow) and compulsory education (purple) developed since 1870, and also how the types of schools used for this purpose evolved. Use some caution with this table which gives a simplified view based on changing policies and legislation, the reality on the ground changed more slowly and is more complex.

Year / Age	5	6	7	8	9	10	11	12	13	14	15	16	17	18	Notes
1870	Elementary school														Schools must be provided by local authorities
1880	Elementary school														Compulsory education from ages of 5 to 10
1893	Elementary school														Compulsory education raised to 11
1899	Elementary school														Compulsory education raised to 13
1900	Elementary school					Higher elementary school									Distinct higher elementary schools created
1902	Primary school Infant school Junior school					Secondary school									Local education authorities created, and new Primary schools
1921	Primary school					Secondary school, Central school									Responsibility for secondary schools passed to the state
1947	Primary school						Secondary modern, grammar school, Secondary Technical School								Tripartite System and Eleven-Plus exam
1960s	First school				Middle school					Upper school, grammar school					Strong move towards comprehensive schools
1973	Primary school						Comprehensive school, grammar school								Phasing out of middle schools
2014	Primary school						Comprehensive school, grammar school								School leaving age increased to 17. Some three-tier areas still exist

== Types of state school ==
Since 1998, there have been six main types of maintained school in England:

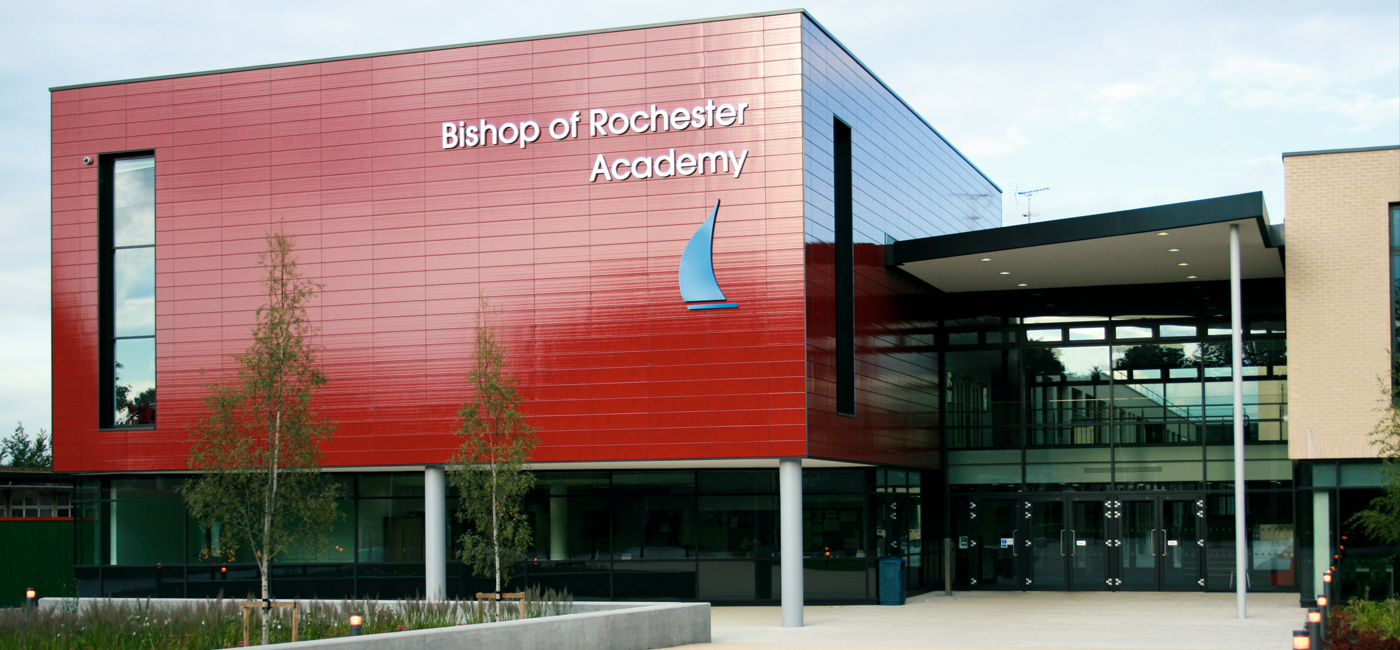
- The Victory Academy, a mixed secondary school in Kent
  Academy schools, established by the 1997–2010 Labour Government to replace poorly performing community schools in areas of high social and economic deprivation. Their start-up costs are typically funded by private means, such as entrepreneurs or NGOs, with running costs met by Central Government and, like Foundation schools, are administratively free from direct local authority control. The 2010 Conservative-Liberal Democrat coalition government expanded the role of Academies in the Academy Programme, in which a wide number of schools in non-deprived areas were also encouraged to become Academies, thereby essentially replacing the role of Foundation schools established by the previous Labour government. They are monitored directly by the Department for Education.

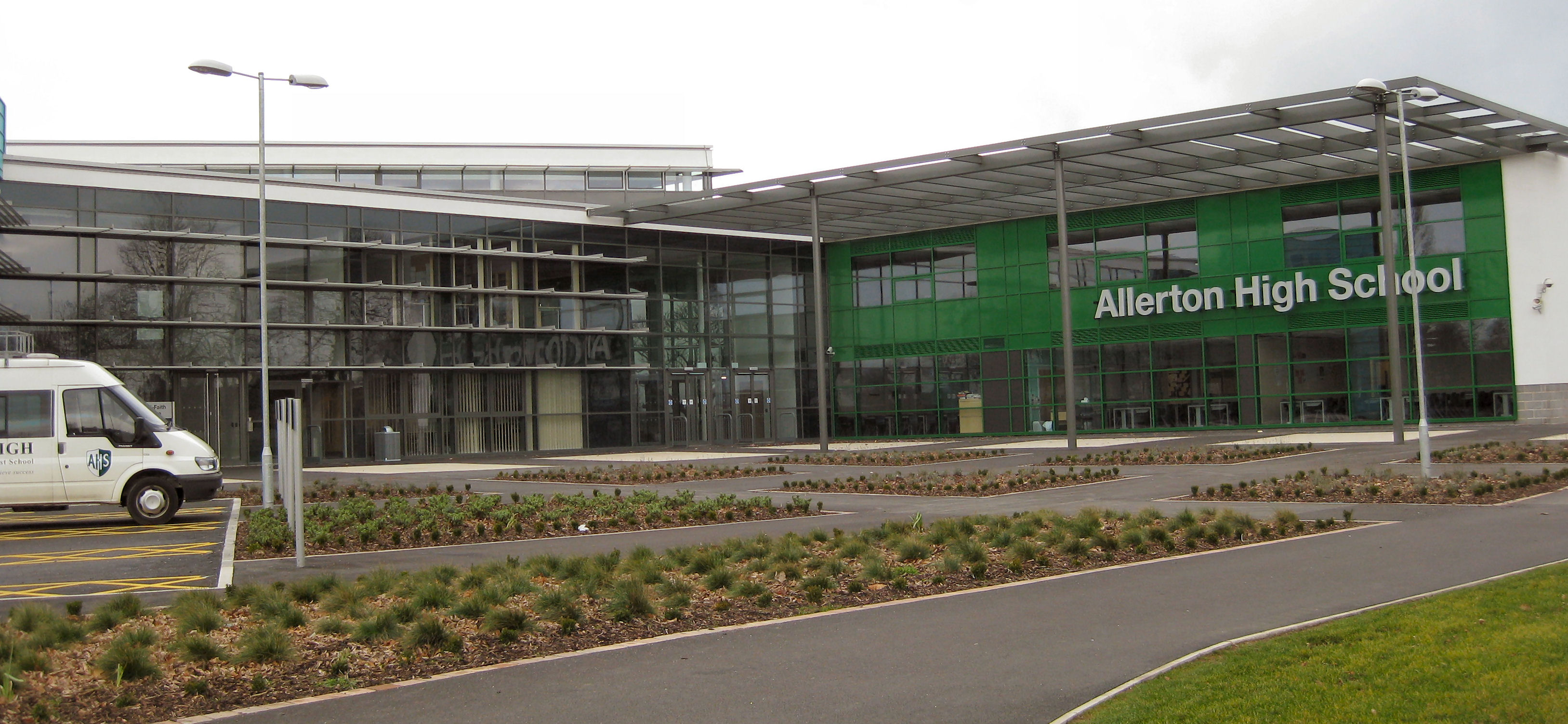
Allerton High School, a secondary school and sixth form in Leeds

- Free schools, introduced by the Conservative-Liberal Democrat coalition following the 2010 general election, are newly established schools in England set up by parents, teachers, universities, charities or businesses, where there is a perceived local need for more schools. They are funded by taxpayers, are academically non-selective and free to attend, and like Foundation schools and Academies, are not controlled by a local authority. They are ultimately accountable to the Secretary of State for Education, and are conceptually based on similar schools found in Sweden, Chile, New Zealand, Canada and the United States, where they are known as Charter schools. The Academies Act 2010 authorises the creation of free schools and allows all existing state schools to become Academy schools. The first 24 free schools opened in Autumn 2011.
- Community schools or county schools, in which the local authority employs the schools' staff, owns the schools' lands and buildings, and has primary responsibility for admissions.
- Foundation schools, in which the governing body employs the staff and has primary responsibility for admissions. School land and buildings are owned by the governing body or by a charitable foundation. The Foundation appoints a minority of governors. Many of these schools were formerly grant maintained schools. In 2005 the Labour government proposed allowing all schools to become Foundation schools if they wished.
- Voluntary aided schools, linked to a variety of organisations. They can be faith schools (about two thirds are Church of England-affiliated; Roman Catholic Church, which are just under one third; or another faith), or non-denominational schools, such as those linked to London Livery Companies. The charitable foundation contributes towards the capital costs of the school, and appoints a majority of the school governors. The governing body employs the staff and has primary responsibility for admissions.
- Voluntary controlled schools, which are almost always faith schools, with the lands and buildings often owned by a charitable foundation. However, the local authority employs the schools' staff and has primary responsibility for admissions.
- University technical colleges (UTCs), established in 2010 are a type of secondary school in England that are led by a sponsor university and have close ties to local business and industry. They are funded by the taxpayer, and are non-selective, free to attend and not controlled by a local authority. The university and industry partners support the curriculum development of the UTC, provide professional development opportunities for teachers, and guide suitably qualified students to industrial apprenticeships, foundation degrees or full degrees. UTCs must specialise in subjects that require technical and modern equipment, but they also all teach business skills and the use of computer science. UTCs are also supposed to offer clear routes into higher education or further learning in work.

In addition, 3 of the 15 City Technology Colleges established in the 1980s still remain, the rest having converted to academies. These are state-funded all-ability secondary schools which charge no fees but which are independent of local authority control. There are also a small number of state-funded boarding schools.

Nearly 90% of state-funded secondary schools are specialist schools, receiving extra funding to develop one or more subjects which the school specialises excellence in, which can select up to 10% of their intake for aptitude in the specialism. In areas children can enter a prestigious grammar school; there are also a number of isolated fully selective grammar schools and a few dozen partially selective schools. A significant minority of state-funded schools are faith schools, which are attached to religious groups, most often the Church of England or the Roman Catholic Church.

All state-funded schools are regularly inspected by the Office for Standards in Education, often known simply as Ofsted. Ofsted publish reports on the quality of education, learning outcomes, management, and safety and behaviour of young people at a particular school on a regular basis. School inspection reports are published online and directly sent to parents and guardians.

== School years ==
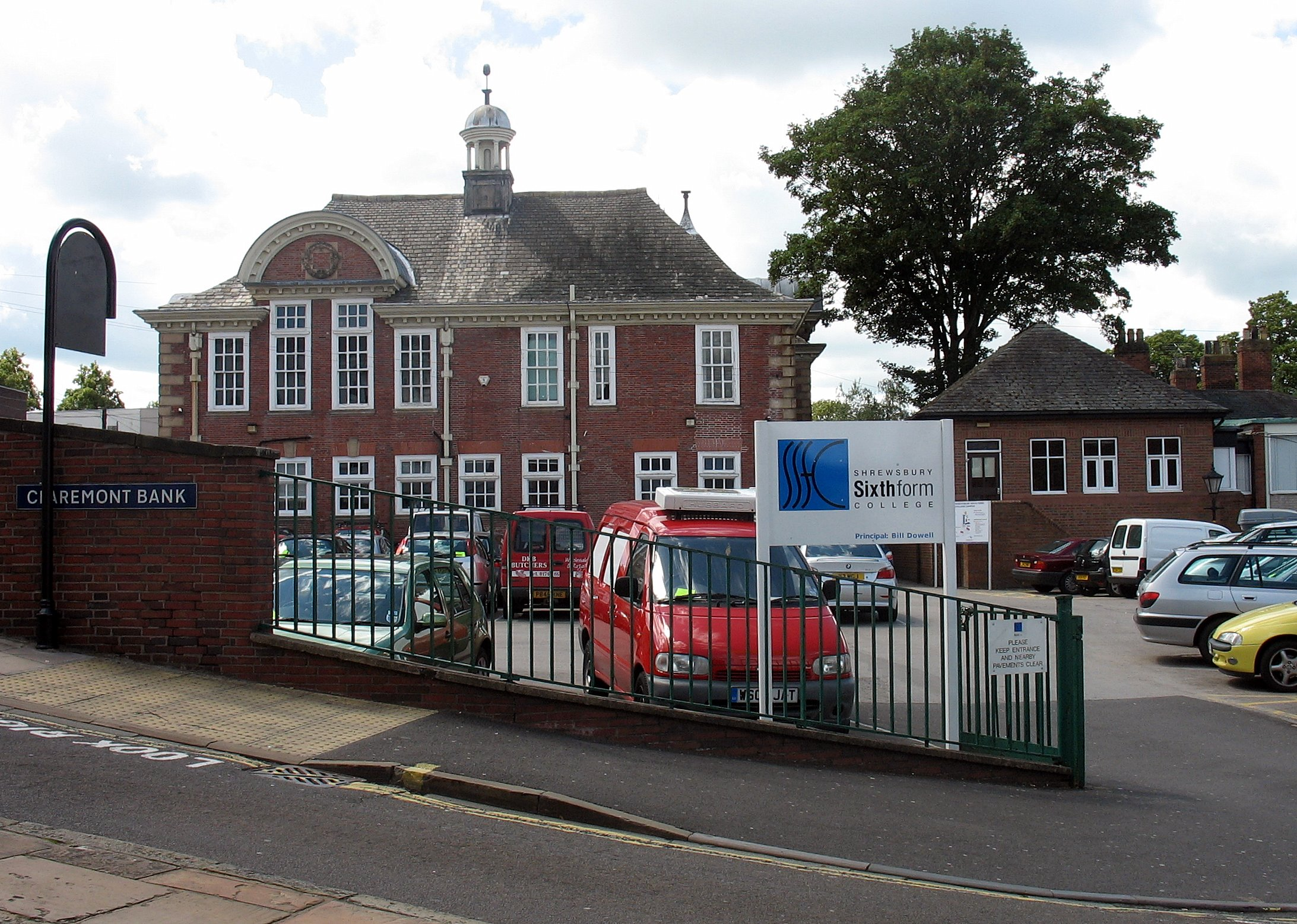
Shrewsbury Sixth Form College in Shropshire

Children are normally placed in year groups determined by the age they will attain at their birthday during the school year. In most cases progression from one year group to another is based purely on chronological age, although it is possible in some circumstances for a student to repeat or skip a year. Repetition may be due to a lack of attendance, for example from a long illness, and especially in Years requiring standard tests. A child significantly more advanced than their classmates may be forwarded one or more years.

State-funded nursery education is available from the age of 3, and may be full-time or part-time, though this is not compulsory. If registered with a state school, attendance is compulsory beginning with the term following the child's fifth birthday. Children can be enrolled in the reception year in September of that school year, thus beginning school at age 4 or 4.5, but parents of children born between April and August may choose to delay school admission until the September following their child's fifth birthday. Unless the student chooses to stay within the education system, compulsory school attendance ends on the last Friday in June during the academic year in which a student attains the age of 16.

In the vast majority of cases, pupils progress from primary to secondary levels at age 11; in some areas either or both of the primary and secondary levels are further subdivided. A few areas have three-tier education systems with an intermediate middle level from age 9 to 13. Years 12 and 13 are often referred to as "lower sixth form" and "upper sixth form" respectively, reflecting their distinct, voluntary nature as the A-level years. While most secondary schools enter their pupils for A-levels, some state schools have joined the independent sector in offering the International Baccalaureate or Cambridge Pre-U qualifications instead.

Some independent schools still refer to Years 7 to 11 as "first form" to "fifth form", reflecting earlier usage. Historically, this arose from the system in public schools, where all forms were divided into Lower, Upper, and sometimes Middle sections. Year 7 is equivalent to "Upper Third Form", Year 8 would have been known as "Lower Fourth", and so on. Some independent schools still employ this method of labelling Year groups.

The table below describes the most common patterns for schooling in the state sector in England:

Age at birthday during school year	Year	Curriculum Stage	State Schools		
4	Nursery	Foundation Stage	Nursery School		
5	Reception	Foundation Stage	Infant School	Primary School	First School
6	Year 1	Key Stage 1	Infant School	Primary School	First School
7	Year 2	Key Stage 1	Infant School	Primary School	First School
8	Year 3	Key Stage 2	Junior School	Primary School	First School
9	Year 4	Key Stage 2	Junior School	Primary School	First School
10	Year 5	Key Stage 2	Junior School	Primary School	Middle School
11	Year 6	Key Stage 2	Junior School	Primary School	Middle School
12	Year 7	Key Stage 3	Secondary School or High School	Secondary School with Sixth Form	Middle School
13	Year 8	Key Stage 3	Secondary School or High School	Secondary School with Sixth Form	Middle School
14	Year 9	Key Stage 3	Secondary School or High School	Secondary School with Sixth Form	Upper School
15	Year 10	Key Stage 4 GCSE	Secondary School or High School	Secondary School with Sixth Form	Upper School
16	Year 11	Key Stage 4 GCSE	Secondary School or High School	Secondary School with Sixth Form	Upper School
17	Year 12 (Lower Sixth)	Key Stage 5 / Sixth Form A-level, BTEC, International Baccalaureate, Cambridge Pre-U, etc.	Sixth Form/FE College	Secondary School with Sixth Form	Upper School
18	Year 13 (Upper Sixth)	Key Stage 5 / Sixth Form A-level, BTEC, International Baccalaureate, Cambridge Pre-U, etc.	Sixth Form/FE College	Secondary School with Sixth Form	Upper School

== Curriculum ==
All maintained schools in England are required to follow the National Curriculum, which is made up of thirteen subjects. Under the National Curriculum, all pupils undergo National Curriculum Tests towards the end of Key Stage 2 at Year 6 in the core subjects of English, Mathematics and Science. Pupils normally take GCSE exams in the last two years of Key Stage 4 at Year 11, but may also choose to work towards the attainment of alternative qualifications.

The core subjects—English, Mathematics and Science—are compulsory for all students aged 5 to 16. A range of other subjects, known as foundation subjects, are compulsory in each Key Stage:

- Art and Design
- Citizenship
- Design and Technology
- Geography
- History
- Computing
- Modern Foreign Languages
- Music
- Physical Education

In addition to the compulsory subjects, students at Key Stage 4 have a statutory entitlement to be able to study at least one subject from the arts (comprising art and design, music, photography, dance, media studies, film studies, drama and media arts), design and technology (comprising design and technology, electronics, engineering, food preparation and nutrition), the humanities (comprising geography and history), business and enterprise (comprising business studies and economics) and one modern language.

Other subjects with a non-statutory programme of study in the National Curriculum are also taught, including Religious education in all Key Stages, Sex education from Key Stage 2, and Career education and Work-related learning in Key Stages 3 and 4. Religious education within schools may be withdrawn for individual pupils with parental consent. Similarly, parents of children in schools may choose to opt their child out of some or all sex education lessons.

== Discipline ==
There is concern that some types of discipline are harsh and can harm pupils. Prolonged periods of isolation are criticised as are excessive suspensions. There is concern that schools, especially academies are choosing punishments that cost less to administer.

== Inspections ==
All state-funded schools are regularly inspected by the Office for Standards in Education, often known simply as Ofsted. Ofsted publish reports on the quality of education at a particular school on a regular basis. Schools judged by Ofsted to be providing an inadequate standard of education may be subject to special measures, which could include replacing the governing body and senior staff. Test and inspection results for schools are published, and are an important measure of their performance.

== Selection and attainment ==
English secondary schools are mostly comprehensive, except in many areas that retain a form of the previous selective system (with students selected for grammar school). There are also a number of isolated fully selective grammar schools, and a few dozen partially selective schools. Specialist schools may also select up to 10% of their intake for aptitude in their specialism (performing arts, art and design, humanities, languages, business studies, science, technology, etc). They are not permitted to select on academic ability generally. The intake of comprehensive schools can vary widely, especially in urban areas with several local schools.

Sir Peter Newsam, Chief Schools Adjudicator 1999–2002, has argued that English schools can be divided into 8 types (with some overlap), based on the ability range of their intake:

1. "Super-Selective": almost all of the intake from the top 10%. These are the few highly selective state grammar schools where there is no other grammar provision close by and consequently intense competition for entry, and which also select from a wide radius (sometimes as much as 30 miles). Examples include Reading School, and such schools dominate school performance tables.
2. "Selective": almost all of the intake from the top 25%. These include grammar schools in areas where the Tripartite system survives, such as Buckinghamshire, Kent and Lincolnshire.
3. "Comprehensive (plus)": admit children of all abilities, but concentrated in the top 50%. These include partially selective schools and high-status faith schools in areas without selection, and are usually in areas with expensive property prices that lead to a predominance of pupils from the higher social classes.
4. "Comprehensive": intake with an ability distribution matching the local population. These schools are most common in rural areas and small towns with no nearby selection, but a few occur in urban areas.
5. "Comprehensive (minus)": admit children of all abilities, but with few in the top 25%. These include comprehensive schools with nearby selective schools "skimming" the intake.
6. Secondary Modern: hardly any of the intake in the top 25%, but an even distribution of the rest. These include non-selective schools in areas where the Tripartite system survives, such as Buckinghamshire, Kent and Lincolnshire. Such schools are little different to "comprehensive minus" in practice.
7. "Comprehensive (Secondary Modern (minus)": no pupils in the top 25% and 10–15% in the next 25%. These schools are most common in urban areas where alternatives of types 1–5 are available.
8. "Comprehensive (Sub-Secondary Modern)": intake heavily weighted toward the low end of the ability range and tend to be in areas of considerable social deprivation.

This ranking is reflected in performance tables, and thus the schools' attractiveness to parents. Thus, although schools may use the phrase "Comprehensive" in their prospectus or name, the schools at the higher end of the spectrum are not comprehensive in intake. Indeed, the variation in the social groupings in school intake, and the differences in academic performance, are enormous, and there are wider variations between supposedly mixed-ability comprehensive schools at the higher and lower end of this scale, than between some grammars and secondary moderns.

== Funding ==
Almost all state-funded schools in England are maintained schools, which receive their funding from local authorities, and are required to follow the National Curriculum. In such schools, all teachers are employed under the nationally agreed School Teachers' Pay and Conditions Document.

== See also ==
- Education in England
- State school
