= Comprehensive school =

Type of school

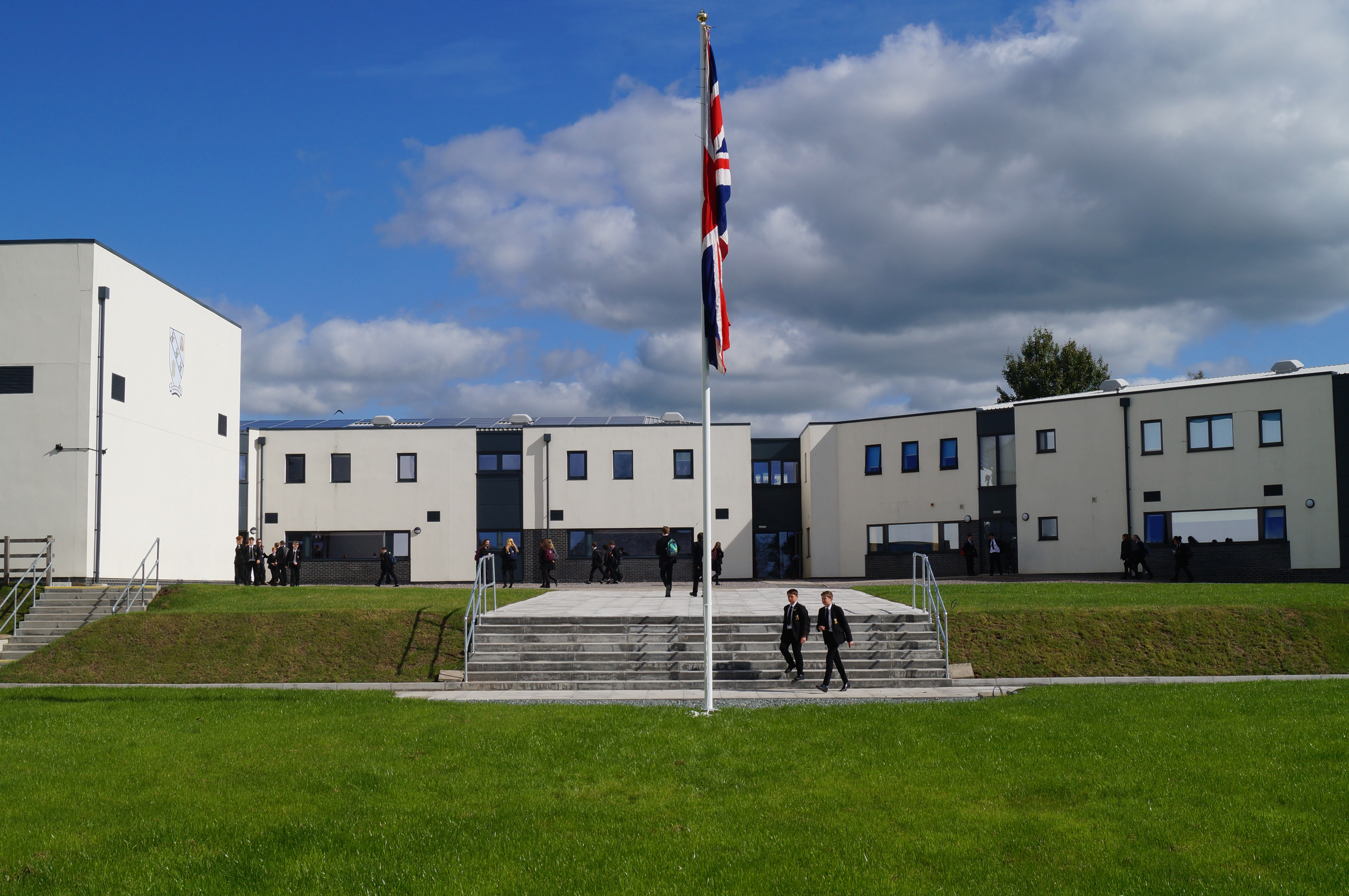
Chulmleigh College, Devon, is a coeducational comprehensive secondary school with academy status.

A comprehensive school is a secondary school for pupils aged 11–16 or 11–18 that does not select its intake on the basis of academic achievement or aptitude. This is as opposed to a selective school, where admission is based on criteria such as academic performance. The term is commonly used in relation to England and Wales, where comprehensive schools were introduced as state schools on an experimental basis in the 1940s and became more widespread from 1965.

About 90% of English secondary school pupils attend such schools (academy schools, community schools, faith schools, foundation schools, free schools, studio schools, university technical colleges, state boarding schools, City Technology Colleges, etc). Specialist schools may however select up to 10% of their intake for aptitude in their specialism. A school may have a few specialisms, like arts (media, performing arts, visual arts), business and enterprise, engineering, humanities, languages, mathematics, computing, music, science, sports, and technology. They are not permitted to select on academic ability generally.

They may be part of a local education authority or be a self governing academy or part of a multi-academy trust. Comprehensive schools correspond broadly to the public school in the United States, Canada and Australia.

== England and Wales ==
=== Description ===
Comprehensive schools provide an entitlement curriculum to all children, without selection whether due to financial considerations or attainment. A consequence of that is a wider ranging curriculum, including practical subjects such as design and technology and vocational learning, which were less common or non-existent in grammar schools. Providing post-16 education cost-effectively becomes more challenging for smaller comprehensive schools, because of the number of courses needed to cover a broader curriculum with comparatively fewer students. This is why schools have tended to get larger and also why many local authorities have organised secondary education into 11–16 schools, with the post-16 provision provided by sixth form colleges and further education colleges. Comprehensive schools do not select their intake on the basis of academic achievement or aptitude. In addition, government initiatives such as the City Technology Colleges and specialist schools programmes have expanded the comprehensive model. City Technology Colleges are independent schools in urban areas that are free to go to. They're funded by central government with company contributions and emphasise teaching science and technology.

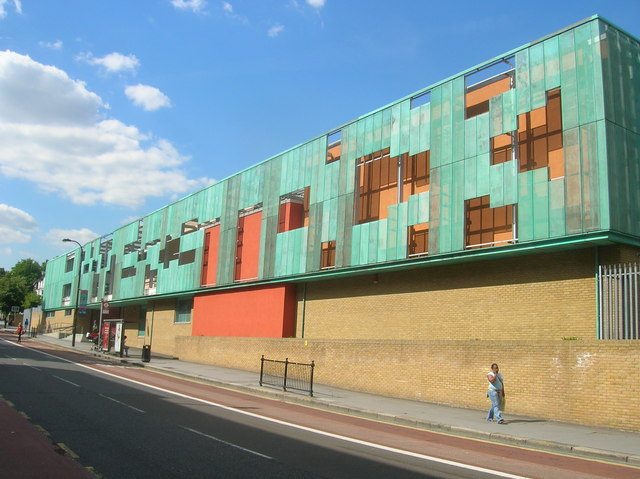
Haverstock School is a coeducational comprehensive school with sixth-form in North London.

English secondary schools are mostly comprehensive (i.e. no entry exam), although the intake of comprehensive schools can vary widely, especially in urban areas with several local schools. Nearly 90% of state-funded secondary schools are specialist schools, receiving extra funding to develop one or more subjects (performing arts, business, humanities, art and design, languages, science, mathematics, technology, engineering, sports, etc.) in which the school specialises, which can select up to 10% of their intake for aptitude in the specialism. In these schools children could be selected on the basis of curriculum aptitude related to the school's specialism even though the schools do take quotas from each quartile of the attainment range to ensure they were not selective by attainment. In the selective school system, which survives in several parts of the United Kingdom, admission is dependent on selection criteria, most commonly a cognitive test or tests.

Most comprehensives are secondary schools for children between the ages of 11 and 16, but in a few areas there are comprehensive middle schools, and in some places the secondary level is divided into two, for students aged 11 to 14 and those aged 14 to 18, roughly corresponding to the US middle school (or junior high school) and high school, respectively. With the advent of Key Stages in the National Curriculum some local authorities reverted from the Middle School system to 11–16 and 11–18 schools so that the transition between schools corresponds to the end of one key stage and the start of another. In principle, comprehensive schools were conceived as "neighbourhood" schools for all students in a specified catchment area.

Maths free schools like Exeter Mathematics School are for 16 to 19 year old pupils who have a great aptitude for maths. As set out in the government's Industrial Strategy, maths schools help to encourage highly skilled graduates in sectors that depend on science, technology, engineering and maths (STEM) skills. The aim of maths schools is to prepare the most mathematically able pupils to succeed in mathematics-related disciplines at university and pursue mathematically intensive careers. Maths schools can also be centres of excellence in raising attainment, supporting and influencing the teaching of mathematics in their surrounding area, and are central to their associated universities' widening participation commitments.

Technical and vocational education in comprehensive schools may be introduced during the secondary school years and this may later progress into further and higher education. Further education incorporates a combination of vocational oriented education and general secondary education. Students may also opt to enroll at a sixth form college or further education college to prepare themselves for a wide curriculum or apprenticeships, study, and national vocational awards. Major provider of vocational qualifications in England include the Business and Technology Education Council (BTEC), City and Guilds of London Institute, National Vocational Qualifications (NVQs), and Edexcel.

=== History ===
The first comprehensives were set up after the Second World War. A central feature of the London County Council (LCC) Schools Plan of 1947 was a proposal to establish 'a system of Comprehensive High Schools'. Earlier in 1946 Walworth School was an 'experimental' comprehensive school set up by the LCC, although London's first purpose built comprehensive was Kidbrooke School built in 1954. Also in 1946 the Windermere Grammar School though retaining the name became a (boys') comprehensive. On the Isle of Man, (a Crown dependency and not part of the United Kingdom) comprehensive education was also introduced in 1946. Mellow Lane School a co-educational comprehensive school was established in 1948 in Hayes then part of the former county of Middlesex. In Wales the first comprehensive school was Holyhead County School in Anglesey in 1949. Coventry opened two comprehensive schools in 1954 by combining grammar schools and secondary modern schools. These were Caludon Castle School and Woodlands School. Mount Grace School, Potters Bar which opened in 1954 was purpose-built as a comprehensive. Another early example was the 1956 Tividale Comprehensive School in Tipton. The first, purpose-built comprehensive in the North of England was Colne Valley High School near Huddersfield in 1956. These early comprehensives mostly modelled themselves, in terms of ethos, on the grammar school, with gown-wearing teachers conducting lessons in a very formal style. The opening of Risinghill School in Islington in 1960 offered an alternative to this model. Embracing the progressive ideals of 1960s education, such schools typically abandoned corporal punishment and brought in a more liberal attitude to discipline and methods of study.

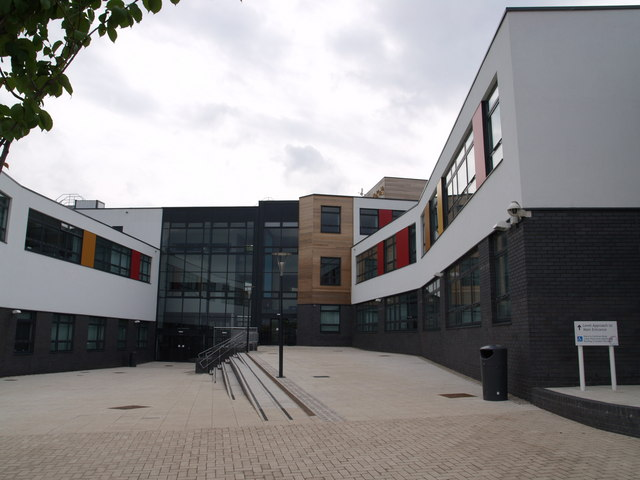
Silverdale School is a coeducational comprehensive school with sixth form in Sheffield with academy status. Established as a secondary modern in 1957 and converted to comprehensive in 1969.

The largest expansion of comprehensive schools resulted from a policy decision taken in 1965 by Anthony Crosland, Secretary of State for Education in the 1964–1970 Labour government. The policy decision was implemented by Circular 10/65, a request to local education authorities to plan for conversion from the prevailing tripartite system. Following the post WW2 education reform introducing tripartite secondary education pupils, excepting those in areas with the early comprehensives, sat the 11+ examination in their last year of primary education and were sent to one of a secondary modern, secondary technical or grammar school depending on their perceived ability. Secondary technical schools were never widely implemented and for 20 years there was a virtual bipartite system which saw fierce competition for the available grammar school places, which varied between 15% and 25% of total secondary places.

In 1970, Margaret Thatcher, the Secretary of State for Education in the new Conservative government, ended the compulsion on local authorities to convert. However, many local authorities were so far down the path that it would have been prohibitively expensive to attempt to reverse the process, and more comprehensive schools were established under Thatcher than any other education secretary. By 1975, the majority of local authorities in England and Wales had abandoned the 11-Plus examination and moved to a comprehensive system. Over that 10-year period, many secondary modern schools and grammar schools were amalgamated to form large neighbourhood comprehensives, whilst a number of new schools were built to accommodate a growing school population. In the mid-1970s, the process of comprehensivisation peaked, leaving selective secondary state education (grammar schools, secondary modern schools, 11+) only with a small number of local education authorities.

In 1976, the Labour Prime Minister James Callaghan launched what became known as the 'great debate' on the education system. He went on to list the areas he believed needed closest scrutiny: the case for a core curriculum, the validity and use of informal teaching methods, the role of school inspections, and the future of the examination system. Comprehensive schools remain the most common type of state secondary school in England, and the only type in Wales. They account for around 90% of pupils, or 64% if one does not count schools with low-level selection. This figure varies by region.

Since the 1988 Education Reform Act, parents have a right to choose to which school their child should go, or whether to not send them to school at all and to home educate them instead. Parents had previously been offered a limited choice of schools depending on the catchment areas which they lived in, as well as the option of attending grammar schools at secondary level and Church of England or Roman Catholic schools at both primary and secondary level.

The concept of "school choice" introduces the idea of competition between state schools, a fundamental change to the original "neighbourhood comprehensive" model, and is partly intended as a means by which schools that are perceived to be inferior are forced either to improve or, if pupil numbers are no longer viable, to close down. Government policy is currently promoting 'specialisation' whereby parents choose a secondary school appropriate for their child's interests and skills. Most initiatives focus on parental choice and information, implementing a quasi-market incentive to encourage better schools. Both Conservative and Labour governments experimented with alternatives to the original neighbourhood comprehensive.

Experiments have included:

- Partnerships where successful schools share knowledge and best practice with nearby schools
- Federations of schools, where a partnership is formalised through joint governance arrangements
- City Technology Colleges, 15 new schools where one fifth of the capital cost is privately funded
- Academy schools, state schools not controlled by the local authority, which are allowed to select up to 10% of admissions by ability
- Free schools, state schools not controlled by the local authority, which are allowed to select up to 10% of admissions by ability

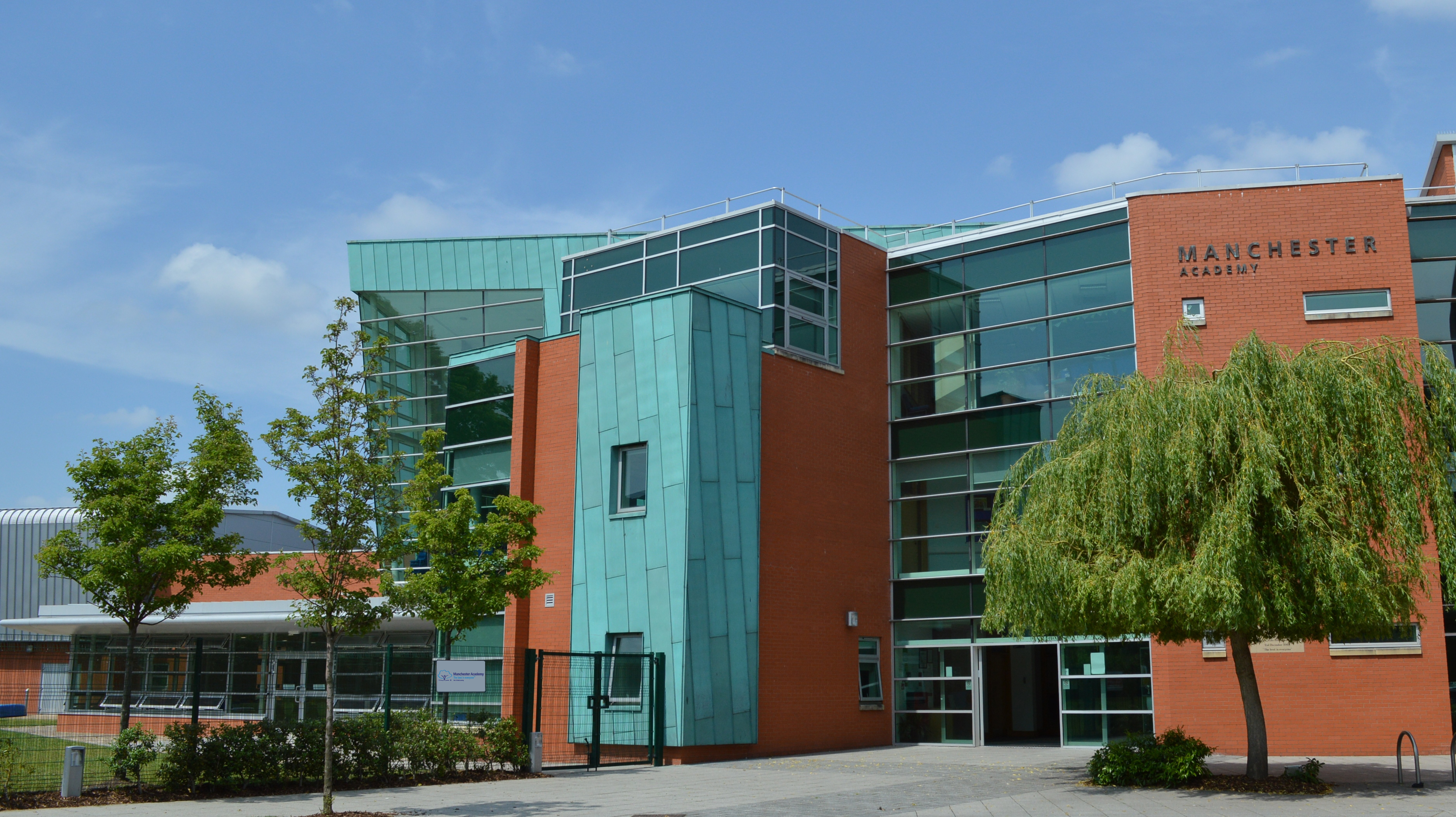
Manchester Academy is a coeducational comprehensive school with academy status in Greater Manchester.

Following the advice of Cyril Taylor, former businessman, Conservative politician, and chairman of the Specialist Schools and Academies Trust (SSAT), in the mid-1990s, all parties have backed the creation of specialist schools, which focus on excellence in a particular subject and are theoretically allowed to select up to 10% of their intake. This policy consensus had brought to an end the notion that all children will go to their local school, and assumes parents will choose a school they feel most meets their child's needs.

=== Curriculum ===
All maintained schools in England are required to follow the National Curriculum, which is made up of twelve subjects. Every state school must offer a curriculum which is balanced and broadly based and which promotes the spiritual, moral, cultural, mental and physical development of pupils at the school and of society, and prepares pupils at the school for the opportunities, responsibilities and experiences of later life. For each of the statutory curriculum subjects, the Secretary of State for Education is required to set out a Programme of Study which outlines the content and matters which must be taught in those subjects at the relevant Key Stages. Teachers should set high expectations for every pupil. They should plan stretching work for pupils whose attainment is significantly above the expected standard. Teachers should use appropriate assessment to set targets which are deliberately ambitious.

Under the National Curriculum, all pupils undergo National Curriculum assessments at the end of Key Stage 2 in Year 6 in the core subjects of English, mathematics and science. Individual teacher assessments are used for foundation subjects, such as art and design, geography, history, design and technology, and computing. Pupils take GCSE exams at Key Stage 4 in Year 11, but may also choose to work towards the attainment of alternative qualifications, such as the National Vocational Qualifications and Business and Technology Education Council. Pupils take GCSEs examinations in the core English literature, English language, mathematics, science, and entitlement subjects from the arts, humanities, design and technology, and languages. The core subjects English, Mathematics and Science are compulsory for all pupils aged 5 to 16. A range of other subjects, known as foundation subjects, are compulsory in each Key Stage:

- Art and design
- Citizenship
- Design and technology
- Geography
- History
- Computing
- Foreign languages
- Music
- Physical education

In addition to the compulsory subjects, pupils at Key Stage 4 have a statutory entitlement to study at least one subject from the arts (comprising art and design, music, photography, dance, drama and media arts), design and technology (comprising design and technology, electronics, engineering, food preparation and nutrition), the humanities (comprising geography and history), and modern foreign languages. Optional subjects include computer science, business studies, economics, astronomy, classical civilisation, film studies, geology, psychology, sociology, ancient languages, and ancient history.

The Department for Education has drawn up a list of preferred subjects known as the English Baccalaureate on the results in eight GCSEs including English, mathematics, the sciences (physics, chemistry, biology, computer science), history, geography, and an ancient or modern foreign language.

All schools are required to make provision for a daily act of collective worship and must teach religious education to pupils at every key stage and sex and relationships education to pupils in secondary education. Parents can withdraw their children for all or part of the lessons. Local councils are responsible for deciding the RE syllabus, but faith schools and academies can set their own. All schools should make provision for personal, social, health and economic education (PSHE). Schools are also free to include other subjects or topics of their choice in planning and designing their own programme of education.

=== School years ===
Children are normally placed in year groups determined by the age they will attain at their birthday during the school year. In most cases progression from one year group to another is based purely on chronological age, although it is possible in some circumstances for a student to repeat or skip a year. Repetition may be due to a lack of attendance, for example due to a long illness, and especially in Years requiring standard tests. A child significantly more advanced than their classmates may be forwarded one or more years.

State-funded nursery education is available from the age of 3, and may be full-time or part-time, though this is not compulsory. If registered with a state school, attendance is compulsory beginning with the term following the child's fifth birthday. Children can be enrolled in the reception year in September of that school year, thus beginning school at age 4 or 4.5. Unless the student chooses to stay within the education system, compulsory school attendance ends on the last Friday in June during the academic year in which a student attains the age of 16.

In the vast majority of cases, pupils progress from primary to secondary levels at age 11; in some areas either or both of the primary and secondary levels are further subdivided. A few areas have three-tier education systems with an intermediate middle level from age 9 to 13. Years 12 and 13 are often referred to as "lower sixth form" and "upper sixth form" respectively, reflecting their distinct, voluntary nature as the A-level years. While most secondary schools enter their pupils for A-levels, some schools offer the International Baccalaureate or Cambridge Pre-U qualifications instead.

Age at birthday during school year	Year	Curriculum stage	Types of State Schools		
4	Nursery	Foundation Stage	Nursery School		
5	Reception	Foundation Stage	Infant School	Primary School	First School
6	Year 1	Key Stage 1	Infant School	Primary School	First School
7	Year 2	Key Stage 1	Infant School	Primary School	First School
8	Year 3	Key Stage 2	Junior School	Primary School	First School
9	Year 4	Key Stage 2	Junior School	Primary School	First School
10	Year 5	Key Stage 2	Junior School	Primary School	Middle School
11	Year 6	Key Stage 2	Junior School	Primary School	Middle School
12	Year 7	Key Stage 3	Secondary School or High School	Secondary School with Sixth Form	Middle School
13	Year 8	Key Stage 3	Secondary School or High School	Secondary School with Sixth Form	Middle School
14	Year 9	Key Stage 3	Secondary School or High School	Secondary School with Sixth Form	Upper School
15	Year 10	Key Stage 4 GCSE	Secondary School or High School	Secondary School with Sixth Form	Upper School
16	Year 11	Key Stage 4 GCSE	Secondary School or High School	Secondary School with Sixth Form	Upper School
17	Year 12 (Lower Sixth)	Key Stage 5 / Sixth Form A-level, Business and Technology Education Council, T-level, International Baccalaureate, Cambridge International, etc.	Sixth Form/FE College	Secondary School with Sixth Form	Upper School
18	Year 13 (Upper Sixth)	Key Stage 5 / Sixth Form A-level, Business and Technology Education Council, T-level, International Baccalaureate, Cambridge International, etc.	Sixth Form/FE College	Secondary School with Sixth Form	Upper School

== Scotland ==
Scotland has a very different educational system from England and Wales, though also based on comprehensive education. It has different ages of transfer, different examinations and a different philosophy of choice and provision. All publicly funded primary and secondary schools are comprehensive. The Scottish Government has rejected plans for specialist schools as of 2005.

== Australia ==
When the first comprehensive schools appeared in the 1950s, the Australian Government started to transition to comprehensive schooling which has been expanding and improving ever since. Prior to the transition into comprehensive schooling systems, primary and secondary state schools regularly measured students' academic merit based on their performance in public examinations. The state of Western Australia was the first to replace selective school systems, then Queensland, and finally South Australia and Victoria.

The Australian education system is organised through three compulsory school types. Students commence their education in Primary school, which runs for seven or eight years, starting at kindergarten through to Year 6 or 7. The next is Secondary school which runs for three or four years, from Year 7 or 8 to Year 10. Finally, Senior Secondary school which runs for two years, completing Years 11 and 12. Each school tier follows a comprehensive curriculum that is categorised into sequences for each Year-level. The Year-level follows specific sequence content and achievement for each subject, which can be interrelated through cross-curricula. In order for students to complete and graduate each tier-level of schooling, they need to complete the subject sequences of content and achievement. Once students have completed Year 12, they may choose to enter into Tertiary education. The two-tier Tertiary education system in Australia includes both higher education (i.e.: university, college, other institutions) and vocational education and training (VET). Higher education works off of the Australian Qualifications Framework and prepares Australians for an academic route that may take them into the theoretical and philosophical lenses of their career options.

== See also ==
- Magnet school#Enrollment and curriculum – Public schools with specialized courses or curricula
- Postcode lottery – Unequal provision of services by area
- Tracking (education) – Separation of students by ability
