= Usborne Young Reading =

Children's book series

Usborne Young Reading is a series of books from Usborne Publishing forming part of the Usborne Reading Programme. They are a collection of stories aimed at readers 5 years and above, covering Key Stage 1 and Key Stage 2 of the English National Curriculum. Series 1 is for beginner readers with simple sentence structure, whilst Series 3 is for more advanced readers.
