= Year 4 =

Educational year group

Year 4 is an educational year group in schools in many countries including England, Wales, Australia and New Zealand. It is usually the fourth year of compulsory education and incorporates students aged between eight and nine. It is the equivalent to third grade in America or Canada.

== Australia ==
In Australia, Year 4 is usually the fifth year of compulsory education. Although there are slight variations between the states, most children in Year 4 are aged between nine and ten.

== New Zealand ==
In New Zealand, Year 4 is the fourth year of compulsory education. Children are aged eight or nine in this year group. Year 4 pupils are usually educated in Primary schools or in Area schools.

== United Kingdom ==
=== England ===
In schools in England Year 4 is the fourth year after Reception. It is the fourth full year of compulsory education, with children being aged between eight and nine. It is also the second year of Key Stage 2 in which the National Curriculum is taught. Year 4 is usually the fifth year of primary school or the second year group in a Junior School.

=== Wales ===
In schools in Wales Year 4 is the fourth year after Reception. It is currently the fourth full year of compulsory education, with children being admitted who are aged 8 before 1 September in any given academic year. It is the second year group in Key Stage 2.

=== Northern Ireland and Scotland ===
In Northern Ireland and Scotland, the fourth year of compulsory education is called Primary 4, and pupils generally start at the age of 7.

Preceded by Year 3	Year 4; 8–9; 9–10	Succeeded by Year 5
