= Year 6 =

Educational year group

Year 6 is an educational year group in schools in many countries including Japan, most of Africa, Australia and New Zealand. It is usually the sixth year of compulsory education and incorporates students aged between ten and eleven. It is generally the same as 5th grade in the United States, although the birthday cutoff date varies for different countries and schools.

== Australia ==
In Australia, Year 6 is usually the seventh year of compulsory education and the last year of Primary School. Although there are slight variations between the states, most children in Year Six are aged between eleven and twelve.

== New Zealand ==
In New Zealand, Year 6 is the sixth year of compulsory education. Children entering this year group are generally aged between 9.5 and 11. Year 6 pupils are usually educated in primary schools or in area schools. For contributing primary schools, this is the last year, with students moving onto intermediate schools or combined intermediate and secondary schools, while full primary schools continue to Year 8.

== United Kingdom ==
=== England ===
In schools in England Year 6 is the sixth year after Reception. It is the sixth full year of compulsory education, with children being aged between ten and eleven. It is also the final year of Key Stage 2 in which the National Curriculum is taught. It is also the year in which all students in maintained schools undertake National Curriculum tests (known as SATs) in the core subjects of English and Mathematics.

Year 6 is usually the final year of Primary or Junior School. In some areas of England, Year 6 is a year group in Middle school, which covers the year 5–8 or 4–7-year groups.And year 6 is the final year of primary schools.

In some parts of England, where there remain separate Grammar and Secondary modern schools, students in Year 6 may sit a test for entrance into a Grammar school. The test is known colloquially as the Eleven plus exam.

=== Wales ===
In schools in Wales Year 6 is the sixth year after Reception. It is currently the sixth full year of compulsory education, with children being admitted who are aged 10 before 1 September in any given academic year. It is the final year group in Key Stage 2.

=== Northern Ireland and Scotland ===
In Northern Ireland and Scotland, the sixth year of compulsory education is called Primary 6, and pupils generally start at the age of 9 or 10.

Preceded by Year 5	Year 6; 10–11; 11–12	Succeeded by Year 7
