= Grade 3 =

Grade 3 may refer to:

- Third grade, the third year of primary education
- Grade 3 Group races, in Thoroughbred horse racing
