= Year 5 =

Educational year group

Year 5 is an educational year group in schools in many countries including England, Wales, Australia and New Zealand. It is usually the fifth year of compulsory education and incorporates students aged between nine and eleven.

== Australia ==
In Australia, Year 5 is usually the sixth year of compulsory education. Although there are slight variations between the states, most children in Year 5 are aged between ten and eleven.

== New Zealand ==
In New Zealand, Year 5 is the fifth year of compulsory education. Children are aged nine or ten in this year group. Year 5 pupils are usually educated in Primary schools or in Area schools.

== United Kingdom ==
=== England ===
In schools in England Year 5 is the fifth year after Reception. It is the fifth full year of compulsory education, with children being aged between nine and ten. It is also the third year of Key Stage 2 in which the National Curriculum is taught.

Year 5 is usually the sixth year of primary school or the third year group in a junior school. In some areas of England, Year 5 is second to final year in first school.

=== Wales ===
In schools in Wales Year 5 is the fifth year after Reception. It is currently the fifth full year of compulsory education, with children being admitted who are aged 9 before 1 September in any given academic year. It is the third year group in Key Stage 2.

=== Northern Ireland and Scotland ===
In Northern Ireland and Scotland, the fifth year of compulsory education is called Primary 5, and pupils generally start at the age of 8 or 9.

Preceded by Year 4	Year 5; 9–10; 10–11	Succeeded by Year 6
