= Year 3 (artwork) =

Photographic project by Steve McQueen

Year 3 is a photographic study by the artist and filmmaker Steve McQueen of children during Year Three of their education at primary schools in London.

76,000 children were photographed for the project, representing two-thirds of the pupils at London's primary schools. All participants were aged seven or eight. The work was a collaboration between McQueen and Artangel. The resultant photographs were displayed in an exhibition at Tate Britain between 12 November 2019 and 31 January 2021 and on 600 billboards across London. The photographs were presented without explanatory captions. The photographs were not named to ensure the safeguarding of individual pupils. All children photographed were invited to Tate Britain to see the exhibition.

McQueen said of the project that "There's an urgency to reflect on who we are and our future...to have a visual reflection on the people who make this city work. I think it’s important and in some ways urgent".

Reviewing the exhibition of Year 3 at the Tate Britain, Laura Cumming wrote in The Guardian that "This is a collective portrait of both our past and our future. Face to face with all this rising hope, which of us could not be moved?" and that the project was "unassailable in its emotional immediacy and grandeur". Cumming wrote that displayed on billboards the children were " ... free from art world associations, and from McQueen's own reputation as a prize-winning artist and film director: standing for potential and liberty, representing nothing but their own unique selves".
