= First grade =

Educational year group

First grade (also 1st grade or grade 1) is the first year of formal or compulsory education. It is the first year of primary school. Children in first grade are usually 6–7 years old.

== Examples by region ==
=== Asia ===
- In Bahrain, the minimum age for the first grade is six years old.
- In Bangladesh, First Grade (known as prothom sreni) begins in January when a student is six years old.
- In China, First Grade, known as 一年级 (yī nián jí), begins in September when a child is six years old.
- In India, children generally enter first grade at around six years of age, in accordance with the school education structure outlined under the National Education Policy 2020. The policy places the foundational stage before formal schooling and emphasizes age-appropriate early childhood education.
- In Iran, children start school at age seven.
- In Israel, children enter the first grade (kita aleph) the year they turn six or seven.
- In Japan, First Grade, commonly 小一 (shō ichi), begins in April when a child is six years old.
- In Malaysia's education system, First Grade (or most commonly, Standard or Year 1) begins at age seven.
- In the Philippines, Grade 1 (Filipino: Baitang Isa) is the first year of Primary Level and Elementary School curriculum. Students are usually 6–7 years old, but some students, mostly females, can start at ages 5-6.
- In Singapore, First Grade (or more commonly, "Primary 1"), begins when a child is six years old. Child at least 6 years old on 1 January of a given year gain admission to P1.
- In South Korea, First Grade, known as 일학년 (il-hak-nyeon), begins in March when a child is six or seven years old.
- In Sri Lanka, children enter Class 1 or 2 when they are six or seven years old.

=== Europe ===
- In Belgium, children aged 6 or 7 years old enter la première année d'enseignement primaire (French Community) or "eerste leerjaar" (Flemish Community) (first year of elementary education).
- In Bulgaria, the minimum age for first graders is 6 years old. The Bulgarian term is 'първи клас' (purvi klas), 'first class'.
- In the Czech Republic, children aged 6 to 7 years old enter the first year of elementary school (první třída).
- In Estonia, children aged 7 to 8 years old enter first grade.
- In Finland, children are aged 6 to 7 at the beginning of this grade. Before first grade, children attend pre-school (first year after kindergarten) at age 5-6.
- In France, children aged 5 to 6 years old enter first grade, which corresponds to the cours préparatoire (preparatory course), more commonly called C.P.
- In Germany, first grade corresponds to Erste Klasse (literal translation: first class).
- In Greece, children are six years old at the beginning of first grade. The first school year of primary education is referred to as First Grade of Primary (Proti Dimotikou - Πρώτη Δημοτικού).
- In Iceland, children enter the first grade (1.bekk) the year they turn six.
- In Ireland, the equivalent is known as "First Class" or Rang a haon. Students are usually 6–7 years old at this level, and it serves as the 3rd year of primary school.
- In Italy, first grade corresponds to primo anno di scuola primaria, also called prima elementare.
- In Kazakhstan, children aged 6 to 7 years old enter бірінші сынып (birinşi sınıp, first grade).
- In the Netherlands, first grade corresponds to Group 3, the third year of primary education.
- In Norway, children enter the first grade the year they turn six.
- In Poland children enter their first year of school (klasa 1) aged seven (from 2012 to 2016 the entry age was six; prior thereto, it was also seven).
- In Portugal, children enter their first year of school (1º ano) aged five or six.
- In Romania, children start First Grade at 7 or 8.
- In Russia, children aged 6 to 8 years old enter первый класс (pervyy klass, first grade).
- In Slovenia, children are aged 5 years and 8 months to 6 years and 8 months at the beginning of this grade.
- In Sweden, children are 7 years old when entering first grade (första klass), and 6 years old when beginning "förskoleklass", the first year after kindergarten.
- In Spain, children are five to six years old when they enter the first year of elementary school (Primero de Educación Primaria).
- In Ukraine, children aged six to seven years old enter перший клас (pershyy klas, first grade).
- In Serbia, children aged six to seven years old enter први разред (prvi razred, first grade).

==== United Kingdom ====
In England and Wales, the first year of primary school is called reception, with pupils 4 to 5 years old. However, the first compulsory school year is Year One, when children are five. As most primary schools have a reception class which is treated like a compulsory school year, i.e. the children wear a uniform and have the same school hours, most children start school at reception. The first grade is the equivalent of Year Two.

Scottish pupils usually enter the corresponding stage one year younger. In Northern Ireland. they are two years younger. In Scotland, first grade is equivalent to Primary 3. Pupils in Primary 3 are 7 to 8 years old. Scotland, these grades are primary school, as Primary 1 starts after kindergarten (nursery school) at 4 to 5 years of age. Primary school continues through Primary 7.

=== North America ===
==== Canada ====
In Canada, the first grade in primary education is referred to as Grade 1 and is attended by children ages 6 to 7.

==== United States ====
In arithmetic, students learn about addition and subtraction of natural or whole numbers, usually with only one digit or two digits, and about measurement. Basic geometry and graphing may sometimes be introduced. Clock and calendar time, as well as money, may also be in the curriculum.

In language arts, first graders are taught the fundamentals of literacy, including reading sentences, writing very simple statements, and mastery of the alphabet, building on what they have learned in kindergarten or other forms of pre-school. Expectations for first grade have changed due to Common Core Standards. The curriculum is typically based on standards developed by educators in each state. Most states use the Common Core Standards, so most schools across the country use similar curricula. First graders are expected to read and comprehend stories ranging in length and difficulty. They are also expected to show an improved fluency rate during the school year, with the ability to read stories by the end of the year.

Students are also typically introduced to the concept of social studies, with an emphasis on establishing ideas of history or civics in either a personal or larger sense. Some states focus on the basics of US history and patriotism, with a focus on the Founding Fathers and the time surrounding the American Revolution; other states require social studies focus on family relationships in first grade, leaving community, state, and national studies to higher grades. Basic geography is also taught in the first grade. Focus on the school's municipal area and culture, along with basic state geography, is also be focused upon in first grade in some states. First-grade science classes usually involve the discussion of matter, plant and animal science, earth materials, and balance and motion, along with the human body and basic health and nutrition.

Science as inquiry is taught and practiced in first grade classes. Students are encouraged to observe the world around them and begin asking questions about things they notice.

=== Africa ===
- In Sudan, children usually start grade 1 at age 6 or 7.
- In South Africa, children start grade 1 at age 6 or 7, depending on their curriculum (whether CAPS or Cambridge schooling system, etc.).

=== Oceania ===
In Australia, first grade is called Year 1 in some states. It is the second year of school after Kindergarten (called Prep in some states), and children are usually between 6 and 7 years old when entering.

In New Zealand, first grade is called "Year 2." Children generally start this level when they are 6 or 7 years old.

=== South America ===
In Argentina, all first grade students must be 6 years old before June 30th of the ongoing school year, students turning 6 on July 1st do not qualify to start the first grade.

In Brazil, first grade is the primeiro ano do Ensino Fundamental I. That is, the minimum age for first grade was changed from 7 (84 months) to 6 years (72 months) when the "alphabetization" grade, called simply Alfabetização (literacy), was renamed first grade, with all following grades renamed as well. All students must be 6 years old before an assigned cut-off date.

In Uruguay, first graders are usually six years old. However, regulations stipulate students must be six years old before April 30 in that given year.

== See also ==
- Educational stage

Preceded by Kindergarten	First grade age 6–7	Succeeded by Second grade
