= Second grade =

Educational year group

Second grade (also 2nd grade or Grade 2) is the second year of formal or compulsory education. It is the second year of primary school. Children in second grade are usually aged 7–8.

== Australia ==
In Australia, this level of class is called Year 2. Children generally start this level between the ages of seven and eight.

== Brazil ==
In Brazil, second grade is the segundo ano do Ensino Fundamental I, in this case, the minimum age required to enter second grade is 7 years (84 months). To enter the second grade, all students must be 7 years old before the cut-off date.

== Cameroon ==
In Cameroon, there are two sub-educational systems: one based on French education taught in French, and the other one based on British educational systems taught in English. This grade thus corresponds to "Class Two" in the English sub-educational system, and to the "Cours Preparatoire (CP)" of the French system.

== Canada ==
In Canada, the equivalent is Grade 2.

== France ==
In France, second grade corresponds to CE1 (Cours Élémentaire 1), the second of five years of elementary school.

== India ==
In India, children enter Class 2 or 3 at ages 7 to 8. Class 2 is generally part of the primary education stage and follows the first year of formal schooling. The curriculum typically builds on basic literacy, numeracy, and foundational learning skills.

== Ireland ==
In Ireland, the equivalent to second grade is known as "Second Class" (usually for 7–8-year-olds), which is year 4 of primary school. It is traditionally the year that is dedicated to preparing for the child's "First Holy Communion"; however, as Ireland has become increasingly multicultural, more and more schools are opting to prepare for the sacrament outside of school hours.

== Italy ==
In Italy, second grade corresponds to the second class of primary school (seconda classe della scuola primaria).

== Kazakhstan ==
In Kazakhstan, the second year of primary school is called Grade 2 (2-сынып). Children typically enter Grade 2 at 7–8 years old, following their first year of primary education. Primary education is part of the 11-year general education system, which includes 1–4 grades of primary school, 5–9 grades of basic secondary school, and 10–11 grades of general secondary school.

== Germany ==
In Germany, second grade is comparable to second class (2.Klasse).

== Greece ==
In Greece, the second school year of primary school is referred to as Second Grade of Primary (Deftera Dimotikou).

== New Zealand ==
In New Zealand, this level of class is called Year 3.

== Peru ==
In Peru, "second grade (Segundo Grado)" is the common term, with pupils between 7–8 years old.

== Philippines ==
In the Philippines, Grade 2 (Filipino: Baitang Dalawa) is the second year of Primary Level and Elementary School curriculum. Students are usually 7–8 years old. Sometimes children start from the young age of 6–7.

== Portugal ==
In Portugal, second grade (segundo ano, 2º ano) is the second of the four-year 1º Ciclo do Ensino Básico that also includes the first grade, the third grade, and the fourth grade.

== United Kingdom ==
The British education system differs slightly between the four individual countries of the United Kingdom.

In England, the second year of school is called year 1, with pupils aged 5 to 6 years old. Second grade is the equivalent of Year 3 in England and Wales, making it the fourth year of compulsory education. In Scottish and Welsh schools, contemporary pupils are in their third year of compulsory education; this level is their fourth year in Northern Ireland.

== United States ==
In the United States, second grade students study arithmetic, working with multi-digit addition and subtraction of natural and whole numbers. They also study time and its division into AM and PM segments; fractions; rounding; and measurement. Usually, multiplication and division are introduced toward the end of the school year. Children usually turn 8 years old during the second grade academic year.

In language arts, students work with regular and irregular verbs, plurals, homophones, compound words, and comparative and superlative adjectives.

Natural science in the second grade includes basic physics like simple machines, magnets, and heat. Students learn about human anatomy, including the heart and digestive system. A basic understanding of the Earth and space is also taught, comprising such topics as basic astronomy, geology, paleontology, and meteorology. The science curriculum may vary by local school district.

Civics class includes topics relating to the presidents, the states, and capitals of the United States, as well as the Civil War and geography.

== In popular culture ==
- Sune börjar tvåan, Anders Jacobsson and Sören Olsson, 1985

== See also ==
- Educational stage
- Elementary schools in Japan

Preceded by First grade	Second grade age 7–8	Succeeded by Third grade
