= Year 9 =

School year group

Year 9 is an educational year group in schools in many countries including England and Wales, Australia and New Zealand. It is the tenth or eleventh year of compulsory education. Children in this year are generally between 13, 14 and 15 year olds, with it being mostly equivalent to eighth grade or freshman year in the United States.

== Australia ==
In Australia, Year 9 is usually the tenth year of compulsory education. Although there are slight variations between the states, most children in Year 9 are aged between fourteen and fifteen.

In Australia, Year 9 is seen by many educators as the "lost year", a period where thousands of students become unengaged with learning, are expelled, suspended or drop out. In recent decades, many Australian schools have implemented Year 9 specialist programs to combat the issue. Most are private schools which send students to outside campuses, whether in a city (such as Melbourne's City Cite), camp, alpine areas or even overseas. Such programs aim to "foster self-management and personal-development skills". A NAPLAN test is held for Year 9 students.

== New Zealand ==
In New Zealand, Year 9 is the ninth year of compulsory education, and the first year of secondary education. Children entering Year Nine are generally aged between 12 and 13. Year 9 pupils are educated in secondary schools or area schools.

== United Kingdom ==
In England and Wales, Year 9 is the ninth year after Reception. It is the ninth full year of compulsory education, with children being aged between thirteen and fourteen. It is also the year in which pupils are formally assessed against National Curriculum levels. With effect from 2009, National Curriculum Tests are no longer compulsory in this year group. Year 9 is usually the third year of Secondary school and was previously known as the 'third year' or 'third form'. Some schools in the UK (especially grammar schools and private schools) still refer to 'year 9' as 'third year'. In most schools in England and Wales, it is also the final year of Key Stage 3. Pupils usually either choose or start their options for their GCSE qualifications in Year 9.

In Scotland, Year 9 is the equivalent to Second year (S2) where pupils start at the age of 12 or 13 and end at the age of 13 or 14. In Second year pupils pick subjects for Third year.

In Northern Ireland, Year 9 is the second year of Secondary education. Children in Year 9 are aged between 12 and 13. It is the second year of Key Stage 3.

Preceded by Year 8	Year 9; 13–14; 14–15	Succeeded by Year 10
