= Third grade =

Educational year

Third grade (also 3rd grade or Grade 3) is the third year of primary school of formal or compulsory education. Children in third grade are usually 8–9 years old.

== Australia ==
In Australia, this level of class is called Year 3. Children generally start this level between the ages of eight and nine.

== Brazil ==
In Brazil, third grade is the terceiro ano do Ensino Fundamental I, in this case, children begin their first year of elementary school at age 6 or 7 depending on their birthdate. Therefore, the 3rd year of elementary school is typically for students of 8 (96 months)–9 years (108 months) of age. All children students must be 8 years old before the cut-off date.

== Britain ==
In England, the year of school that is the same age as 3rd Grade is Year 4, which is the fourth year of compulsory education. Most children start one year earlier, however, in the Reception class. Welsh pupils are in their fourth full year of compulsory education. In Northern Ireland and Scottish pupils are in "Primary 4", their fourth year of compulsory education.

== Canada ==
In Canada, the year is called Grade 3, and the pupils are known as "3rd grade".

== France ==
In France, children aged 8 join CE2 ("Cours élémentaire deuxième année"), the third school year of primary school. It was formerly called "neuvième" (ninth year before Terminale, the "baccalauréat" year).

== Germany ==
In Germany, the equivalent grade is 3.

== Greece ==
In Greece, the third school year of primary school is referred to as Third Grade of Primary (Triti - Τρίτη Δημοτικού).

== India ==
In India, children typically enter Class 3 at around 8 years of age, although the exact age may vary depending on the child's date of birth and the school's admission requirements. Class 3 is generally part of the primary education stage, following Classes 1 and 2. Some children may enter Class 3 or Class 4 at ages 8 to 9, depending on their previous schooling and the education system followed by their school.

== Ireland ==
In the Republic of Ireland, the equivalent is Third Class or Rang a trí (for 9–10-year-olds) which is the fifth year of Primary School.

== Kazakhstan ==
In Kazakhstan, the third year of primary school is called Class 3 (3-сынып). Children generally enter Grade 3 at 8–9 years old. It continues the primary education stage within the 11-year general education system.

== New Zealand ==
In New Zealand, this level of class is called Standard 2 or Year 4. Children generally start this level between the ages of eight and nine.

== Philippines ==
In the Philippines, this levels of class is called Grade 3. Children generally start this level for females between ages of 7-10 and male students between 8-11.

== Portugal ==
In Portugal, the third grade (terceiro ano, 3.º ano) is the third year of the four-year 1.º Ciclo do Ensino Básico that includes also the first, second and fourth grade.

== Spain ==
In Spain for children from 8 to 9 years old is also the third year of elementary education (tercero de EGB, tercero de primaria). Also, elementary education is further subdivided into two stages. This is the third year in the first stage or primaria in Spanish.

== United States ==
In the United States, children are usually enrolled at school at ages 8–9.

In mathematics, students are usually introduced to multiplication and division facts, place value to thousands or ten thousands, and estimation. Depending on the elementary school, third-grade students may even work on long division, such as dividing in double digits, hundreds, and thousands. Decimals (to tenths only) are sometimes introduced. Students work on problem-solving skills working to explain their thinking in mathematical terms.

In science, third-grade students are usually taught basic physics and chemistry. Weather and climate are also sometimes taught. The concept of atoms and molecules is common, the states of matter and energy, along with basic chemical elements such as oxygen, hydrogen, gold, zinc, and iron. Nutrition is also sometimes taught in third grade, along with chemistry.

In reading and language arts, third-grade students usually begin working more on text comprehension by using informational articles or different genre books than decoding strategies. Students also begin reading harder chapter books. They read and distinguish between various book genres: realistic fiction, non-fiction, poetry, fantasy, historical fiction, science fiction and folktales. Kids learn to read, vocabulary, and writing strategies such as finding main idea, finding theme, citing textual evidence, compare and contrast, nouns, verbs, context clues, writing narratives, writing research reports, writing explanatory essays, and writing persuasive and argumentative pieces.

Grade 3 students learn how to work on projects on their own and with others. This may start as early as second grade and first grade as well. Social skills, empathy and leadership are considered by some educators to be as important to develop as the academic skills of reading, writing and arithmetic.

Although more common in the past than today, many students begin writing in cursive at this grade level. In some schools, cursive writing is taught in earlier grades, such as in second grade.

Preceded by Second grade	Third grade age 8–9	Succeeded by Fourth grade
