= Year 8 =

School year group

Year 8 is an educational year group in schools in many countries including England, Wales, Australia and New Zealand. It is the eighth or ninth year of compulsory education. It is known as First Year in Scotland and Ireland. Children in this year are between 12 and 13. This is generally equivalent to Seventh grade in the United States.

== Australia ==
In Australia, Year 8 is usually the ninth year of compulsory education. Although there are slight variations between the states, most children in Year 8 are aged between thirteen and fourteen.

== New Zealand ==
In New Zealand, Year 8 is the eighth year of compulsory education, and the last of primary education. Children entering Year 8 are generally aged between 11.5 and 13. Year 8 pupils are educated in full primary schools or intermediate schools, and in some areas area schools or combined intermediate and secondary schools.

== United Kingdom ==
=== England and Wales ===
In schools in England and Wales, Year 8 is the eighth year after Reception. It is the eighth full year of compulsory education, with children being aged between twelve and thirteen. It is also the second year of Key Stage 3 in which the Secondary National Curriculum is taught.

Year 8 is usually the second year of Secondary school (commonly referred to by students as high school after most middle schools were abolished). In some areas of England, Year 8 is the last year group in Middle school or the first year of Secondary School.

=== Northern Ireland ===
In Northern Ireland, Year 8 is the first year of Secondary education. Children in Year 8 are aged between 11 and 12, although some join at 13. It is the first year of Key Stage 3.

Preceded by Year 7	Year 8; 12–13; 13–14	Succeeded by Year 9
