= Year 3 =

Educational year group

Year 3 is an educational year group in schools in many countries including England, Wales, Australia, New Zealand and Malaysia. It is usually the third year of compulsory education and incorporates students aged between seven and eight. It is the equivalent to second grade in America or Canada.

== Australia ==
In Australia, Year 3 is usually the fourth year of compulsory education after kindergarten. Although there are slight variations between the states, most children in Year 3 are aged between eight and nine.

== New Zealand ==
In New Zealand, Year 3 is the third full year of compulsory education. Children are aged seven or eight in this year group. When children start school, they begin in New Entrants and typically move to Year 1 when the next school year begins. Year 3 pupils are usually educated in Primary schools or in Area schools.

== United Kingdom ==
=== England ===
In schools in England Year 3 is the third year after Reception. It is the third full year of compulsory education, with children being aged between seven and eight. It is also the first year of Key Stage 2 in which the National Curriculum is taught.

Year 3 is usually the fourth year of primary school or the first year group in a junior school. In some areas of England, Year 3 is the final or penultimate year group in first school.

=== Wales ===
In schools in Wales Year 3 is the third year after Reception. It is currently the third full year of compulsory education, with children being admitted who are aged 7 before 1 September in any given academic year. It is the first year group in Key Stage 2.

=== Northern Ireland and Scotland ===
In Northern Ireland and Scotland, the third year of compulsory education is called Primary Three, and pupils generally start at the age of 6.

Preceded by Year 2	Year 3; 7–8; 8–9	Succeeded by Year 4
