= Year 2 =

Educational year group

Year 2 is an educational year group in schools in many countries including England, Wales, Australia and New Zealand. It is usually the second year of compulsory education and incorporates students aged between six and eight.

== Australia ==
In Australia, Year 2 is usually the third year of compulsory education. Although there are slight variations between the states, most children in Year 2 are aged between seven and eight.

== New Zealand ==
In New Zealand, Year 2 is the second year of compulsory education. Children are aged six or seven in this year group. Year 2 pupils are usually educated in Primary schools or in Area schools.

== United Kingdom ==
=== England ===
In schools in England Year 2 is the second year after Reception. It is the second full year of compulsory education, with children being aged between six and seven. The equivalent form in the US is 1st grade.

Year 2 is usually the third and final year in infant or the third year of primary school.

=== Wales ===
In schools in Wales Year 2 is the second year after Reception. It is currently the second full year of compulsory education, with children being admitted who are aged 6 before 1 September in any given academic year. It is currently part of Key Stage 1, although from 2011 will form the final of four years in the Foundation phase.

=== Northern Ireland and Scotland ===
In Northern Ireland and Scotland, the second year of compulsory education is called Primary 2, and pupils generally start at the age of 5.

Preceded by Year One	Year 2; 6–7; 7–8	Succeeded by Year 3
