= Key Stage 4 =

Multi-year educational stage in many UK schools

Key Stage 4 (KS4) is the legal term for the two years of school education which incorporate GCSEs, and other examinations, in maintained schools in England normally known as Year 10 and Year 11, when pupils are aged between 14 and 16 by August 31. (In some schools, KS4 work is started in Year 9.)

== Legal definition ==
The term is defined in the Education Act 2002 as "the period beginning at the same time as the school year in which the majority of pupils in his class attain the age of fifteen and ending at the same time as the school year in which the majority of pupils in his class cease to be of compulsory school age". Since that Act, the ending of compulsory education in England has been extended beyond the age of sixteen, but compulsory education beyond the age of 16 is not classed as part of Key Stage 4.

== England and Wales ==
=== Purpose ===
The term is used to define the group of pupils who must follow the relevant programmes of study from the National Curriculum. All pupils in this Key Stage must follow a programme of education in the following areas:

- English
- Mathematics
- Science
- Computing (England only)
- Physical Education
- Citizenship
- Careers Education
- Religious Education
- Work-related learning
- Welsh (Wales only)

In addition, there is a statutory duty on schools to provide an optional programme of education for pupils in this Key Stage in each of the following areas:

- The Arts
- Design and Technology
- The Humanities and Healthcare
- Modern Foreign Languages

At the end of this stage, pupils aged 15 or 16 depending on their birthday - in Year 11 - are normally entered for a range of external examinations. Most frequently, these are GCSE (General Certificate of Secondary Education) examinations, although a range of other qualifications is growing in popularity, including NVQ National Vocational Qualifications. These examinations are set by one of the examination boards. Results of examinations at this age are published as part of the Department for Education Performance Tables.

== Northern Ireland ==
=== Legal definition ===
The term is defined in The Education (Northern Ireland) Order 2006 as "the period beginning at the same time as the next school year after the end of key stage 3 and ending at the same time as he ceases to be of compulsory school age". Notably, the earlier Key Stages are defined as lasting for ten years in total from the start of compulsory education.

=== Purpose ===
The term is used to define the group of pupils who must follow the relevant programmes of study from the National Curriculum. All pupils in this Key Stage must follow a programme of education in the nine areas of learning in the curriculum, some of which include specific subject strands:

- Language and Literacy
- Mathematics and Numeracy
- Modern Languages
- The Arts
- Environment and Society
- Science and Technology
- Learning for Life and Work
  - Employability
  - Local and Global Citizenship
  - Personal Development
- Physical Education
- Religious Education

== See also ==
- Key Stage
- Key Stage 1
- Key Stage 2
- Key Stage 3
- Key Stage 5
- GCSE
- National Vocational Qualification
