= Key Stage 3 =

British three-year education level

Key Stage 3 (commonly abbreviated as KS3) is the legal term for the three years of schooling in maintained schools in England and Wales normally known as Year 7, Year 8 and Year 9, when pupils are aged between 11 and 14. In Northern Ireland the term also refers to the first three years of secondary education.

== England and Wales ==
=== Legal definition ===
The term is defined in the Education Act 2002 as "the period beginning at the same time as the school year in which the majority of pupils in his class attain the age of twelve and ending at the same time as the school year in which the majority of pupils in his class attain the age of fourteen" (i.e. a three-year period).

This Key Stage normally covers pupils during their first three years of secondary education, although in some cases part or all of this stage may fall in a middle or high school. Some middle and high schools have been piloting accelerated Key Stage 3, by teaching the same curriculum over only two years.

=== Purpose ===
The term is used to define the group of pupils who must follow the relevant programmes of study from the National Curriculum. All pupils in this Key Stage must follow a programme of education in at least 15 areas:

- English
- Mathematics
- Science
- Computing
- Design and Technology
- History
- Geography
- Modern Foreign Language
- Art and design
- Music
- Physical education
- Career education
- Welsh (in Wales only)

(The reference gives three additional areas: religious education, citizenship education and sex education.)

At the end of this stage, pupils aged 14 or almost age 14 – in Year 9 – are assessed as part of the national programme of National Curriculum assessment. Until 2008 this involved a series of externally marked tests. However, from 2009, this will be based on on-going teacher assessment, with results for each school being published in performance tables. They also undergo tests before moving up to Key Stage 4.

== Northern Ireland ==
=== Legal definition ===
The term is defined in The Education (Northern Ireland) Order 2006 as "key stage 3 is the period beginning at the same time as the next school year after the end of key stage 2 and ending at the same time as the school year in which the majority of pupils in his class complete three school years in that key stage". Notably, the foundation stage and Key Stage 1 and Key Stage 2 are defined as lasting for seven years in total from the start of compulsory education.

=== Purpose ===
The term is used to define the group of pupils who must follow the relevant programmes of study from the National Curriculum. All pupils in this Key Stage must follow a programme of education in the nine areas of learning in the curriculum, some of which include specific subject strands:

- Language and Literacy
  - English
  - Irish (in Irish-speaking schools)
  - Media Education
- Mathematics and Numeracy
  - Mathematics
  - Financial Capability
- Modern Languages
- The Arts
  - Art and Design
  - Music
  - Drama
- Environment and Society
  - History
  - Geography
- Science and Technology
  - Science
  - Technology & Design
- Learning for Life and Work
  - Employability
  - Local and Global Citizenship
  - Personal Development
  - Home Economics
- Physical Education
- Religious Education

== See also ==
- Key Stage
- Key Stage 1
- Key Stage 2
- Key Stage 4
- Key Stage 5
