= Year 1 (education) =

Educational year group

Year 1 is an educational year group in schools in many countries including England, Wales, Australia and New Zealand. It is usually the first year of compulsory education and incorporates students aged between five and seven.

== Australia ==
In Australia, Year 1 is usually the second year of compulsory education. Although there are slight variations between the states, most children in Year 1 are aged between six and seven.

== New Zealand ==
In New Zealand, Year 1 is the first year of compulsory education. Children are aged five or six in this year group. Year 1 pupils are usually educated in Primary schools or in Area schools.

== United Kingdom ==
=== England and Wales ===
In schools in England and Wales, Year 1 is the first year after Reception. It is currently the first full year of compulsory education, with children being aged between five and six. It is also the first year of Key Stage 1 in which the first sections of the National Curriculum are introduced.

Year 1 is usually the second year in infant or primary school.

In Wales, Year 1 is part of the Foundation phase.

=== Northern Ireland and Scotland ===
In Northern Ireland and Scotland, the first year of compulsory education is called primary 1, and pupils generally start at four or five years old.

Preceded by Nursery or Reception	Year 1; 5–6; 6–7	Succeeded by Year 2
