= Junior school =

Type of school which provides primary education to children

A junior school is a type of school which provides primary education to children, often in the age range from 8 to 13, following attendance at an infant school, which covers the age range 5–7. Since both infant and junior schools provide primary education, pupils are commonly placed in a unified building – a primary school.

== Australia ==
In Australia, a junior school is usually a part of a private school that educates children between the ages of 2 and 5.

In South Australia a junior primary school, it is where a child will begin their education, usually in or before the year level preceding Year 1. Depending on the school, a child will move to the main primary school between the ages of 3 in 8

In most primary schools, the junior primary is located within the same buildings and grounds as the primary school, although some junior schools are located on an adjacent or separate site.

== Canada ==
In Canada, mostly in Toronto, the term junior school is used by the former Etobicoke Board of Education to refer to public schools from kindergarten to grade 5. Most of the schools in the former Scarborough Board of Education and the Toronto Board of Education use the term junior public school for schools from kindergarten to grade 6.

== United Kingdom ==
In the United Kingdom a junior school is usually a small school serving a particular locality, and is also used by independent schools to refer to the nursery and primary school services they offer.

A junior school forms part of the local pattern of provision for primary education. Most junior schools cater for pupils moving from infant schools from the September following their seventh birthday, after they have taken their Key stage 1 SATs. Pupils join in Year 3, and stay at the school for four years, leaving at the end of Year 6 when most pupils are aged 11. These four years form Key Stage 2 in the English education system. At the end of this time, most pupils will move to a secondary school.

In the late 1960s and early 1970s, a significant number of junior schools were abolished in favour of 9-14 middle schools, and while some of these remain open today the majority of them have been abolished in favour of a return to traditional 7–11 junior schools.

In some London boroughs, a JMI is a "junior mixed infant school" which caters to children aged 4 to 11. Some have been renamed to the more common "primary school".

== See also ==
- Education in the United Kingdom
- Education in Australia
- Primary education
- Infant school
- Primary school
- Middle school
- Three-tier education
