= Key Stage 1 =

Educational level in the UK

Key Stage 1 is the legal term for the two years of schooling in maintained schools in England normally known as Year 1 and Year 2, when pupils are aged between 5 and 7. This Key Stage normally covers pupils during infant school, although in some cases this might form part of a first or primary school. It is also the label used for the third and fourth years of primary education in Northern Ireland. In Hong Kong, it is used to describe Primary One to Primary Three.

== England and Wales ==
=== Legal definition ===
The term is defined in the Education Act 2002 as "the period beginning at the same time as the school year in which he attains the age of six and ending at the same time as the school year in which the majority of pupils in his class attain the age of seven".

=== Purpose ===
The term is used to define the group of pupils who must follow the relevant programmes of study from the National Curriculum. All pupils in this Key Stage must follow a programme of education in these areas:

- English
- Mathematics
- Science
- Design and Technology
- History
- Geography
- Art and Design
- Music
- Physical Education (PE) including swimming
- Computing
- Religious Education

Schools must provide Religious Education, but parents can ask for their children to be taken out of the whole lesson or part of it. Optionally at this Key Stage, schools often teach Personal, Social and Health education (PSHE) and/or citizenship.

At the end of this stage, pupils in England in Year 2 (aged 7 or almost age 7) are normally assessed in national tests (and teacher assessments) in English, maths and science, colloquially known as SATs. The tests, carried out by the teacher during May, cover English reading; English grammar, punctuation and spelling; and maths.

== Northern Ireland ==
=== Legal definition ===
The term is defined in The Education (Northern Ireland) Order 2006 as "the period beginning at the same time as the next school year after the end of the foundation stage and ending at the same time as the school year in which the majority of pupils in his class complete two school years in that key stage". Notably, the foundation stage is defined as lasting for two years from the start of compulsory education.

=== Purpose ===
The term is used to define the group of pupils who must follow the relevant programmes of study from the National Curriculum. All pupils in this Key Stage must follow a programme of education in the six areas of learning in the curriculum:

- Language and Literacy
- Mathematics and Numeracy
- The Arts
- The World Around Us
- Personal Development and Mutual Understanding
- Physical Education

== See also ==
- Key Stage
- Key Stage 2
- Key Stage 3
- Key Stage 4
- Key Stage 5
- Early Years Foundation Stage
