= Key Stage 2 =

Educational level in the UK

Key Stage 2 is the legal term for the four years of schooling in maintained schools in England and Wales normally known as Year 3, Year 4, Year 5 and Year 6, when the pupils are aged between 7 and 11 years.

== England and Wales ==
=== Legal definition ===
The term is defined in the Education Act 2002 as the period beginning at the same time as the school year in which the majority of pupils in a class attain the age of eight and ending at the same time as the school year in which the majority of pupils in a class attain the age of eleven. This Key Stage normally covers pupils during junior schools, although in some cases part or all of this stage may fall in a middle, or a through primary school.

=== Purpose ===
The term is used to define the group of pupils who must follow the relevant programmes of study from the National Curriculum. All pupils in this Key Stage must follow a programme of education in these 12 areas:

- English
- Mathematics
- Science
- Design and Technology
- History
- Geography
- Art and Design
- Music
- Physical Education (PE) including swimming
- Computing
- Ancient and Modern Foreign Languages
- Religious Education*

Schools must provide Religious Education but parents can ask for their children to be taken out of the whole lesson or part of it. Optionally at this Key Stage, schools often teach Personal, Social, Health and Economic Education (PSHE) and/or citizenship.

At the end of this stage, pupils aged 11 or almost age 11– in Year 6 – are tested as part of the national programme of National Curriculum Tests, colloquially known as SATs in England. These tests cover English and Mathematics. The tests are externally marked, with results for each school being published in DfE performance tables. In Wales since 2013, pupils sit annual numeracy and literacy tests called National Tests.

== Northern Ireland ==
=== Legal definition ===
The term is defined in The Education (Northern Ireland) Order 2006 as "the period beginning at the same time as the next school year after the end of key stage 1 and ending at the same time as the school year in which the majority of pupils in his class complete three school years in that key stage". Notably, the foundation stage and Key Stage 1 are defined as lasting for four years in total from the start of compulsory education. The Key Stage 2 is applied differently in Northern Ireland where it refers to pupils in P5, P6 and P7 (pupils aged 8 to 11). This is also the case in Hong Kong.

=== Purpose ===
The term is used to define the group of pupils who must follow the relevant programmes of study from the National Curriculum. All pupils in this Key Stage must follow a programme of education in the six areas of learning in the curriculum.:

- Language and Literacy
- Mathematics and Numeracy
- The Arts
- The World Around Us
- Personal Development and Mutual Understanding
- Physical Education
- Modern Foreign Languages - All children at KS2 will be given the opportunity to participate in a language by 2010.

== See also ==
- Key Stage 1
- Key Stage 3
- Key Stage 4
- Key Stage 5
