= National Curriculum assessment =

Assessment tests for primary schools in England

The National Curriculum assessment usually refers to the statutory assessments carried out in primary schools in England, colloquially known as standard assessment tasks (SATs). The assessments are made up of a combination of testing and teacher assessment judgements and are used in all government-funded primary schools in England to assess the attainment of pupils against the programmes of study of the National Curriculum at the end of Key Stages 1 and 2 where all pupils are aged 6 to 7 and 10 to 11 respectively. Until 2008, assessments were also required at the end of Key Stage 3 (14-year-olds) in secondary schools after which they were scrapped.

== History ==
The front cover of the 2025 reading SATs test

The assessments were introduced following the introduction of a National Curriculum to schools in England and Wales under the Education Reform Act 1988. As the curriculum was gradually rolled out from 1989, statutory assessments were introduced between 1991 and 1995, with those in Key Stage 1 first, following by Key Stages 2 and 3 respectively as each cohort completed a full key stage. The assessments were introduced only for the core subjects of English, mathematics and science. The first assessments in Key Stage 1 were a range of cross-curricular tasks to be delivered in the classroom, known as standardised assessment tasks - hence the common acronym 'SATs'. However, the complexity of the use of these meant they were quickly replaced by more formal tasks. The assessments in Key Stages 2 and 3 were developed using more traditional tests.

In all 3 Key Stages, tests became the main form of statutory assessment, but a separate strand of Teacher Assessment was also used. This allowed teachers to make judgements about pupils they taught, based on their knowledge of the pupil's learning and attainment against the attainment targets contained within the national curriculum. The results of both tests and teacher assessments were reported using a common scale of attainment levels, numbered 1 to 8 across the three key stages, with the national expectation that pupils would achieve Level 2 at the age of 7; Level 4 at the age of 11; and Level 5 or 6 by the age of 14.

This model continued, with minor adjustments to reflect the changing content of the National Curriculum, up to 2004. From 2005, the role of the tests was downplayed at Key Stage 1, with tests being used only internally to support teacher assessment judgements. Further changes came in 2008 when the government announced that testing in Key Stage 3 was to be scrapped altogether.

In 2013, then Education Minister Michael Gove announced that when the new version of the National Curriculum was introduced to schools from 2014, the system of attainment levels would be removed. As a result, since 2016, the old system has levels that are no longer used as part of statutory assessment. Instead, tests and teacher assessments now follow different models at each key stage.

== Current assessment ==
National Curriculum Assessments are now carried out only at the end of Key Stages 1 and 2. At both key stages the process includes a combination of tests and teacher assessment judgements. The first round of assessments in the new model was undertaken in 2016.

=== Key Stage 1 ===
There are two elements to the statutory assessment process in Key Stage 1: tests and teacher assessment. The tests are used only to support teacher's judgement; it is the teacher assessment which is recorded as the statutory outcome. Statutory assessment takes place in reading, writing, mathematics and science. For each subject, teachers use the available evidence to reach one of a number of judgements, based on the national assessment framework. The judgements available for reading, writing and mathematics are as follows:

- Working at Greater Depth within the Expected Standard
- Working at the Expected Standard
- Working towards the Expected Standard
- Foundations for the Expected Standard
- Below the Standard of the pre-Key Stage

Teacher assessments are based on evidence gathered throughout the school year, including classroom work, observations, homework, and test results, providing a broader picture of a pupil's attainment than tests alone.

In science, the only judgement available is 'Working at the Expected Standard', or alternatively an indication that the child has not yet met the expected standard for his/her age. Each judgement band is illustrated in the Teacher Assessment framework documentation by a number of descriptors of performance. To achieve a given standard, pupils must achieve all of the descriptors within that band. For pupils with Special Educational Needs a separate judgement may be made using a separate grading system known as P-levels.

Judgements in reading, writing and mathematics are supported by test papers which are administered during May of Year 2. The reading and maths tests are statutory for schools. Schools can choose to use an optional Grammar, Punctuation and Spelling test to support judgements in writing. There is no test available for science.

=== Key Stage 2 ===
During May of Year 6, the final year of Key Stage 2, children in state-funded schools (and independent schools if they so choose) undertake three National Curriculum Tests: Reading; Grammar, Punctuation and Spelling; and Mathematics. Writing is assessed solely based on teacher judgement against the assessment framework, following the recommendations of the 2011 Bew Review. Science tests are taken biennially by a selected sample of pupils to monitor national performance in science; the results of these tests are reported to their future secondary schools and parents by June. The test is taken in May.

In addition to the tests, teachers are required to provide teacher assessments in the core subject areas of reading, writing, mathematics and science. As at Key Stage 1, these judgements are based on a framework of descriptors, for which a child must meet all requirements to be awarded the band grade. The judgements available at Key Stage 2 differ for the subjects because of the different roles played. Writing has most available judgements as it is part of the statutory accountability judgement. Reading and mathematics have fewer judgements as the statutory focus is on the test scores. Science has only one available judgement, as at Key Stage 1. The grades available, therefore, are:

Broad ability	Mathematics	Reading	Writing	Science
Above Expected	Working at the Expected Standard	Working at the Expected Standard	Working at Greater Depth within the Expected Standard	Working at the Expected Standard
Expected Standard	Working at the Expected Standard	Working at the Expected Standard	Working at the Expected standard	Working at the Expected Standard
Below Expected	Has Not Met the Expected Standard	Working Towards the Expected Standard	Has Not Met the Expected Standard	Has Not Met the Expected Standard
Below Expected	Growing Development of the Expected Standard	Growing Development of the Expected Standard	Growing Development of the Expected Standard	Has Not Met the Expected Standard
Below Expected	Early Development of the Expected Standard	Early Development of the Expected Standard	Early Development of the Expected Standard	Has Not Met the Expected Standard
Below Expected	Foundations for the Expected Standard	Foundations for the Expected Standard	Foundations for the Expected Standard	Has Not Met the Expected Standard
Below Expected	Below the Standard of the pre-Key Stage	Below the Standard of the pre-Key Stage	Below the Standard of the pre-Key Stage	Has Not Met the Expected Standard

== Other assessments ==
The National Curriculum only extends to pupils in Years 1 to 11 of compulsory education in England. Outside of the statutory National Curriculum assessment in years 2 and 6, the only other centrally collected assessment data is from GCSE exams, usually taken in Year 11, and from the phonics screening check in Year 1. For pupils in other year groups there are no centralised assessments, although schools are free to use tests and examinations either of their own making, or purchased from a supplier.

In the Early Years Foundation Stage, where children are aged under 5, assessment takes place using a separate framework. There is also a times table test in Year 4 which was held for the first time in 2022 after COVID-19 delayed the original idea.

== Criticisms ==
The two main teaching unions spearheaded a boycott of the tests in 1993. In a 2008 report evaluating and analysing National Testing, the House of Commons, the Select committee and the Department for Children, Schools and Families registered its concern with the current testing arrangements in state schools. It raised concerns that the "professional abilities of teachers" were under-used and that the high-stakes nature of the tests led to "phenomena such as teaching to the test, narrowing the curriculum and focusing disproportionate resources on borderline pupils." They further recommended that the multiple uses of National Curriculum assessment – for local accountability, national monitoring, and individual progress measurement – be separated into different forms of assessment.

Two leading unions, the NUT and the NAHT (though not the NASUWT), voted to boycott the tests in 2010, which resulted in a quarter of schools not administering the tests. These unions wanted to see the tests replaced by teacher assessment.

Parents and children have also proposed the idea of the SATs being scrapped due to causing too much pressure on young children.
