= Area school =

Type of school in New Zealand and Australia

In New Zealand and Australia, an area school is a school that takes children from kindergarten age (usually 4 or 5 years old) all the way through to tertiary entrance exams (at about age 18). They tend to be built in small towns where the cost of separate primary and secondary schools cannot be justified because there are too few pupils to have separate schools. These schools distinguish between primary and secondary stages internally but there is a single headteacher, faculty and administration.

The New Zealand Area Schools Association (NZASA) is the organisation that represents the interests of area schools, and concerns itself with educational matters in rural areas.
