= Reception (school) =

Year of schooling in England and Wales

Reception (also known as Year R, Year 0, or FS2 for foundation second year) is the first year of primary school in England and Wales. It comes after nursery and before Year One in England and Wales, or before Primary 2 in Northern Ireland.

Pupils in Reception are usually aged between four and five. Children start school either in the term or in the academic year in which they reach five, depending on the policy of the Local Education Authority. Reception is the final part of the Early Years Foundation Stage of education.

Most areas admit entire year groups in September, regardless of which month they were born, meaning that some pupils will be starting primary school in the month of their fifth birthday, while others will be almost a year behind this milestone.

There is no reception year in Scotland, as children progress directly from Nursery to Primary 1 (equivalent to English Year 1) in the August nearest their fifth birthday. Generally, this means that a complete intake into P1 ranges from four and a half to five and a half years old. If a child is still age 4 on the day they would usually start primary 1, their legal guardian has the right to delay (or defer) when they start primary school. This means they can start school the following year, when they are 5.

Early year groups in the UK
England & Wales	Scotland	Northern Ireland	Age
Reception	Primary 1	P1	4–5
Year One	Primary 2	P2	5–6
Year Two	Primary 3	P3	6–7

Previously, children in England and Wales started school later than children in Northern Ireland, where the starting age was generally four, dependent on the date of the child's birthday.
