= Jacqueline Whitelaw =

British journalist (1957–2021)

- Jacqueline Whitelaw, from a 2021 news item
- Born: 29 May 1957
- Died: 20 July 2021
- Other names: Jackie Whitelaw
- Occupation(s): Journalist, editor

Jacqueline Whitelaw (29 May 1957 – 20 July 2021), usually credited as Jackie Whitelaw, was a British technical journalist and editor, based in London. She focused on civil engineering, infrastructure, and transportation planning topics.

== Early life ==
Whitelaw completed a degree in history and archaeology at the University of Exeter in 1978.

== Career ==
After college, Whitelaw joined the staff of New Civil Engineer, initially as a secretary to the managing director. She served as the magazine's deputy editor from 1998 to 2009, and wrote profiles and reports for the magazine as a freelancer after 2009. From 2011 to 2013, she was editor of Transportation Professional, a publication of the Chartered Institution of Highways and Transportation (CIHT), focusing especially on London's transportation planning around the 2012 Summer Olympics. From 2014 to 2015 she was co-founder and associate editor of Infrastructure Intelligence, an online news service under the auspices of the Association for Consultancy and Engineering. She also wrote for Public Finance.

Among her last published articles were interviews with MIT professor Caitlin Mueller and John French of Cambridge Innovation Parks, on designing for carbon neutrality standards, and an article about the use of concrete with sensors for building information modelling in Hong Kong.

== Personal life ==
Whitelaw died in 2021, aged 64 years.
