= Queen's Road, Richmond =

Street in London, England

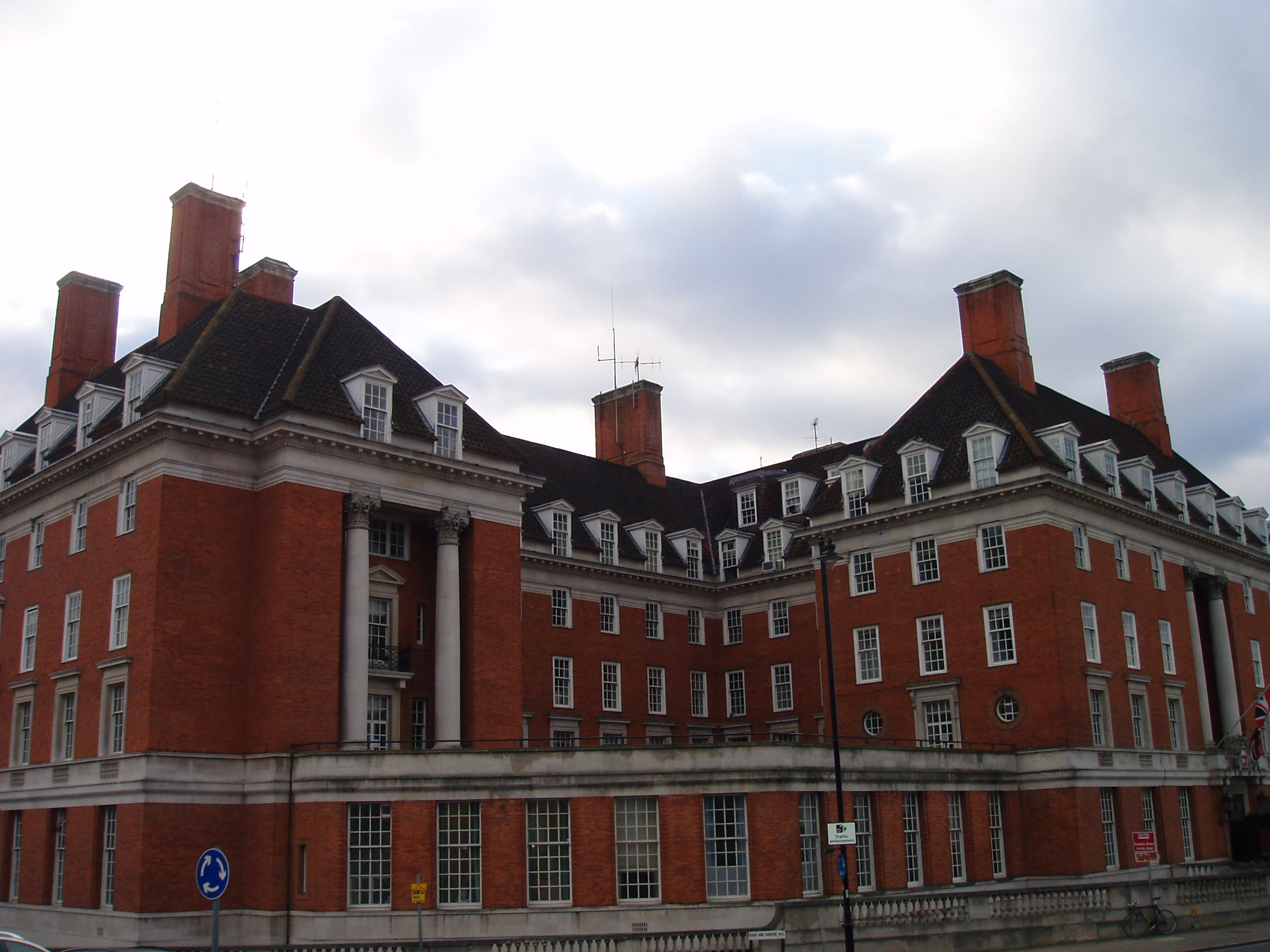
The former Star and Garter Home at the southern end of Queen's Road on Richmond Hill

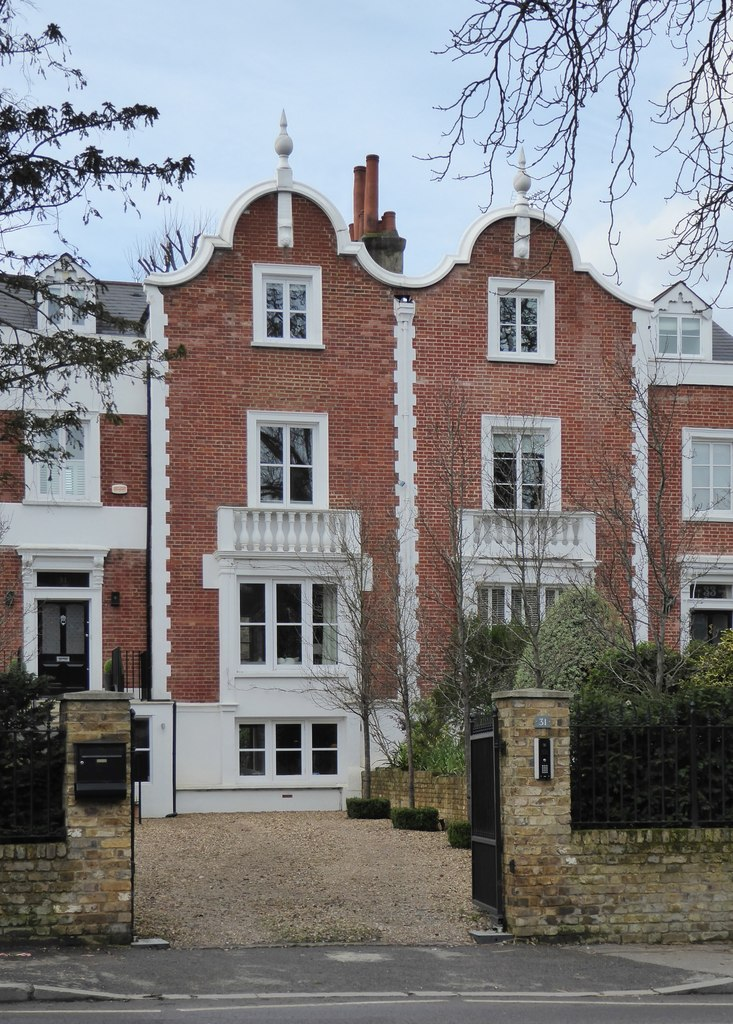
Houses in the street

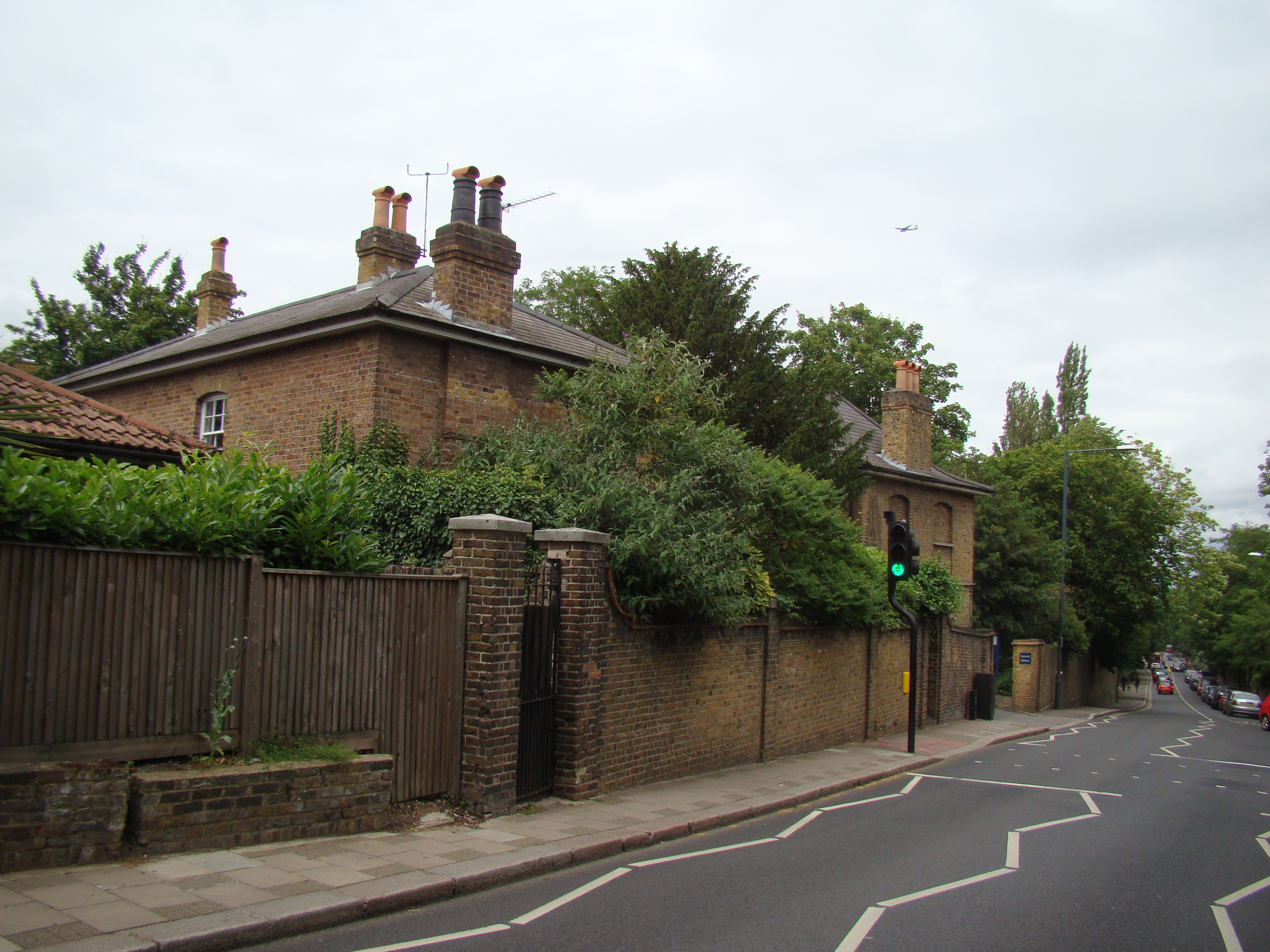
Entrance to the former site of the American University

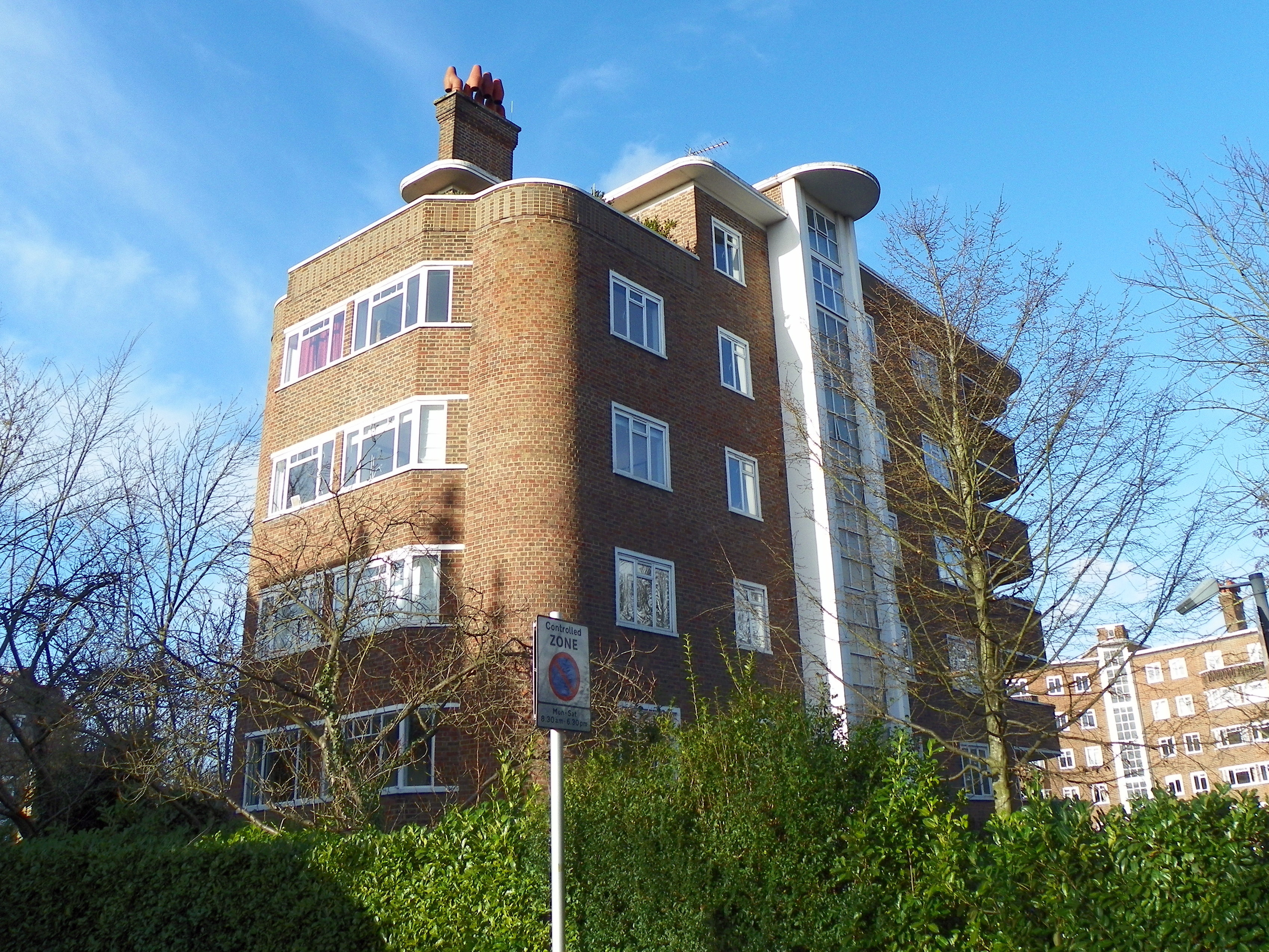
The Art Deco Queen's Court

Queen's Road is a street in Richmond in the London Borough of Richmond upon Thames, running southwestwards from Sheen Road up Richmond Hill until it meets the street of that name by the former Star and Garter Home. It forms a section of the B353 road and runs roughly parallel to the edge of Richmond Park. Pesthouse Common, now an area of open space but previously the site of a plague house, is located near the northern end of the street.

The street includes three schools – Christ's School which is a secondary school, and two primary schools, Marshgate Primary School and St Elizabeth's RC Primary School. The former Richmond Theological College was the site of the Richmond American University from 1972 to 2022 until it relocated to Chiswick Park.

The street dates back until at least the eighteenth century, when it was a carriageway across common land in what was then largely rural Surrey. Historically named Black Horse Lane after a public house at the junction with Sheen Road (which is still there but no longer in use), it gained its current name in the 1840s when, according to the Richmond Local History Society, it was "almost certainly" renamed in honour of Queen Victoria. The street was improved from 1825 at the behest of Joseph Ellis, the owner of the Star and Garter Hotel, despite concerns from Richmond traders that this might mean that visitors would bypass the town when travelling to Richmond Hill. Some of the street's older buildings, including the Grade II-listed Richmond Gate Hotel, are at its southern end.

The more modern social housing of the Queen's Road Estate was developed between 1971 and 1983 by the Richmond Parish Lands Charity and designed by the architects Darbourne & Darke. The first phase of the estate was Grade II listed by Historic England in 2012.

The history of the street was the subject of a Museum of Richmond exhibition in 2020/21. A digital version of the exhibition is still available to view online.

== Bibliography ==
- Nairn, Ian & Pevsner, Nikolaus. The Buildings of England: Surrey. Penguin Books, 1962.
- Members of the Richmond Local History Society. The Streets of Richmond and Kew. Richmond Local History Society, fourth edition, 2022. ISBN 978-1-9123140-3-4.
- Museum of Richmond. Queen's Road: 500 Years of History, exhibition booklet, 28pp, 2020.
- Walford, Edward. Greater London: A Narrative of Its History, Its People and Its Places, Volume 2. Cassell, 1898.
