= Mathematics and Computing College (United Kingdom specialist schools programme) =

Specialist state school in England

Maths & Computing Colleges logo

Mathematics and Computing Colleges were introduced in England in 2002 and Northern Ireland in 2006 as part of the United Kingdom Government's Specialist Schools programme, which was designed to raise standards in secondary education. Specialist schools focussed on their chosen specialism but also had to meet the requirements of the National Curriculum and deliver a broad and balanced education to their pupils. Mathematics and Computing Colleges focussed on mathematics and either computing or ICT.

Colleges were expected to disseminate good practice and share resources with other schools and the wider community. They often developed partnerships with local organisations and their feeder primary schools. They also worked with local businesses to promote the use of mathematics and computing outside of school.

In 2007 there were 222 schools in England which were designated as specialist Mathematics and Computing Colleges. A further 21 schools were designated in combined specialisms which included mathematics and computing, and 15 had a second specialism in Mathematics and Computing.

The Specialist Schools programme ended in 2011. Since then, schools in England have to either become an academy or apply through the Dedicated Schools Grant if they wish to become a Mathematics and Computing College. As of 2021, there are few Mathematics and Computing Colleges left in the United Kingdom.

== See also ==
- Maths school – 2014 onwards
