= Richmond University =

Richmond University may refer to:

- Richmond American University London, a private university in London, United Kingdom
- University of Richmond, a private liberal arts college in Richmond, Virginia, United States
