= Conor Ryan (consultant) =

Irish consultant

Director of External Relations at the Office for Students
- In office 2018–2023
- Preceded by: Position established

Personal details
- Born: 1963 (age 62–63) Dublin, Ireland
- Party: Irish Labour Party (until 1984); British Labour Party (since 1984)
- Education: University College Dublin (BA and MA)
- Profession: Journalist; writer; consultant
- Website: Official blog

Conor Ryan (born 1963) (Note: See conorfyan.blogspot.com. Aged 33 in May 1997) is an Irish-born UK-based independent writer and consultant, a former senior civil servant, and adviser who was until June 2023 the Director of External Relations at the Office for Students, a non-departmental public body of the British Department for Education. He served as a special adviser and the senior education adviser to British Secretary of State for Education and Employment David Blunkett from 1997 to 2001 (Note: Also advised Blunkett when he was Shadow Secretary of State for Health (1993 to 1994) and Shadow Secretary of State for Education and Employment (1994 to 1997)) and then to British Prime Minister Tony Blair from 2005 to 2007.

== Early life ==
Ryan was born in 1963 in Dublin, Ireland. He attended University College Dublin, where he gained a Bachelor of Arts and Master of Arts in political science. After graduating, Ryan moved to England in 1984 as an economic migrant and began working as a communications officer at the British Youth Council. He then worked at the Inner London Education Authority as a schools press officer, which gave him expert knowledge in the field of education. He remained in this position until 1989 and then worked as a press officer at the Association of London Authorities in the early 1990s.

== Political career ==
In Ireland, Ryan had been part of the Labour Left faction of the Irish Labour Party which was critical of the coalition supported by party leader Dick Spring. This was a reforming left-wing faction of the party. After coming to Britain, Ryan was involved with the British Labour Party. He became chairman of the Constituency Labour Party in Mitcham and Morden and sat on the Labour Co-ordinating Committee, a Blairite faction of the party that supported Tony Blair's goal of party modernisation.

In 1993, Ryan became Shadow Secretary of State for Health David Blunkett's policy aide, political spokesman and senior political adviser. Labour, which was led by party leader John Smith, was the largest opposition party in parliament and therefore shadowed the governing Conservative Party led by Prime Minister John Major. Smith died in 1994 and Tony Blair was elected the new Labour leader. Blair intended to modernise the party under his New Labour project which moved it from the left to the centre-ground. Ryan was a party loyalist under Blair's tenure and was considered a "firm favourite" among the inner circles of New Labour. Ryan became Blunkett's senior education adviser in 1994; Blunkett was re-elected to the shadow cabinet as Shadow Secretary of State for Education and Employment. With the consultation of Blair's advisers, they co-authored several important documents on policy which eventually formed the basis of education policy in the early years of the New Labour government. Examples include Excellence for Everyone and Diversity and Excellence. He worked with Blunkett and the rest of his team, David Miliband and Michael Barber, to build New Labour's education policy.

When Labour was elected into government in 1997, Ryan followed Blunkett into the Department for Education and Employment. From this point, Ryan was Blunkett's special adviser. He and Sophie Linden worked closely with Blunkett's other advisers, including Hilary Benn and Nick Pearce. Ryan worked with Miliband, Barber and Stephen Byers to draw up the new government's education white paper. One of the government's priorities was modernising the education system by turning comprehensive schools into specialist schools. Ryan was one of the main leaders of this policy alongside Miliband, Barber and advisers Andrew Adonis and Cyril Taylor. He was also responsible with Blunkett and Barber for the creation of the Standards and Effectiveness Unit, a somewhat independent ministerial unit within the Department for Education and Employment responsible for notifying local authorities of government policy and its effects on them. He became Blunkett's chief of staff and spin-doctor, becoming known as Blunkett's own Alastair Campbell.

In December 1999, Ryan left his post as Blunkett's adviser to manage Frank Dobson's successful bid to be selected as Labour's candidate in the 2000 London mayoral election. He became the spin-doctor for Dobson's campaign but fell ill from appendicitis in January 2000, before returning to the Department for Education and Employment upon his recovery. He was the second spin-doctor to drop out of Dobson's campaign. The Guardian's George Low suggested that Blunkett had allowed Ryan to manage Dobson's bid temporarily. After Labour's victory in the 2001 general election, Blunkett was promoted to the Home Office as Secretary of State for the Home Department and Ryan ceased to be his adviser and became an independent writer and consultant.

After the 2005 general election, Ryan succeeded Andrew Adonis as Prime Minister Tony Blair's senior education adviser. He was also employed as one of Blair's special advisers and joined the Number 10 Policy Unit under David Bennett, serving as its education adviser. His appointment was well received among leaders in the teaching profession, including by the National Union of Teachers. Ryan was given responsibility for building support in the Parliamentary Labour Party for Blair's controversial Education and Inspections Bill. The Bill was approved by parliament in May 2006 but only due to Conservative support. He was also a major figure in devising Labour's campaign strategy against Conservative leader David Cameron. Ryan remained an adviser to the Prime Minister until 2007.

Following Gordon Brown's resignation as Leader of the Labour Party and Prime Minister in May 2010, Ryan believed that Labour's next leader had to be someone "who can craft an approach to opposition and a plan for government that moves beyond New Labour, but which doesn't ignore the lessons that allowed 13 years in government". He added: "The person most likely to offer that balance is David Miliband." Ryan had worked with Miliband from 1994 when he was David Blunkett's education adviser. Miliband would lose narrowly to his brother Ed Miliband in 2010's Labour leadership election.

In February 2011, Ryan followed Andrew Adonis in supporting the Conservative–Liberal Democrat coalition government's free schools policy and criticised Labour's shadow secretary of state for education Andy Burnham for opposing it. He also supported the coalition's other educational reforms such as qualification reform. He did however find the coalition's economic policy very concerning.

== Writing and journalism ==
As a student in Ireland in the 1980s, Ryan used to write letters to The Irish Times. The subjects of these letters ranged from the Militant Tendency to film censorship. He was also a regular contributor to the Evening Press and Irish Independent. Before 1993 and in the early 2000s he was also a journalist for The Independent, The Guardian, Daily Mail, TES, New Statesman and Evening Standard. By 1997, he had also written for Tribune. He became an independent writer in 2001 and wrote in Irish and British national media about education and Irish politics. He continued to write for most of his old employers. Other publications that Ryan has written for include The Sunday Times and Public Finance.

Ryan has also written multiple educational books. In 2002, Ryan wrote the short book Freedom from Failure for the Centre for Policy Studies. It argued that the reforms to education of the previous fifteen years had to go further, with "radical solutions" such as closing more failing schools being proposed. In 2004, he edited Bac or Basics: challenges for the 14–19 curriculum and co-authored, with Cyril Taylor, Excellence in Education: The Making of Great Schools. His 2008 publication Staying the Course: Changes to the Participation Age and Qualifications is a collection of essays from educationists featuring Mike Tomlinson, Michael Barber, Alison Wolf, Alan Smithers and Mike Baker. The essays covered the Brown ministry's plans to raise the school-leaving age and reform qualifications and discussed the benefits and downsides of these plans. Ryan also wrote in Academies, a 2008 book produced by think tank CentreForum that recommended the expansion of the academies programme to the primary school sector. Other people who wrote in the book included Andrew Adonis, Paul Marshall and Anthony Seldon. Ryan has written for other think tanks including the Social Market Foundation. He is also the co-author of the 2011 book Lessons for Life with Sue Langmead.

== Other ventures ==
In 2002, Ryan became a school governor at Wellsway School, Keynsham, England. He is a director at the Futura Learning Partnership (formerly the Wellsway Multi-Academy Trust) and is chairman of its education and standards committee.

Ryan became an independent consultant from 2001 to 2005 and 2007-2012and began to work for education organisations such as the Sutton Trust. He became Director of Research and Communications at the trust in July 2012, where he remained until May 2018. In July 2015, he became a trustee of the National Foundation for Educational Research (NFER).

Ryan was appointed to the board of the Oak National Academy in 2024. He was appointed to the board of Ofqual in 2025.

From 2015 to 2016, Ryan was part of the Scottish Commission on Widening Access. This commission was supported by the Scottish Government and was chaired by Dame Ruth Silver. After the commission's completion, Ryan chaired the group responsible for developing the Scottish Government's framework for fair access on the behalf of Peter Scott. The framework, which was recommended in the Commission on Widening Access, was officially launched in May 2019.

=== Office for Students ===
From 2018 to 2023, Ryan was the first Director of External Relations at the Office for Students (OfS), a non-departmental public body of the British Department for Education. In this position, he was responsible for stakeholder and student engagement, student information, and communications, and was a member of senior management. He was also chairman of the OfS UK Student Information Group where he led a review of the National Student Survey that ensured its survival.
