= William Petrek =

American philosopher (1928–2011)

- Born: February 26, 1928; Arcadia, Wisconsin
- Died: May 7, 2011 (aged 83); Northfield, Minnesota

Philosophical work
- Era: 21st-century philosophy
- Region: Western philosophy
- School: Continental
- Institutions: American International University in London
- Main interests: phenomenology

William (Bill) Joseph Petrek (February 26, 1928 - May 7, 2011) was an American philosopher and professor of philosophy at Hofstra University. He was the President of The American International University in London, England. He was also a former provost of Hofstra University.
