= Rural dimension =

Curriculum for English specialist schools

The rural dimension was an optional initiative in curriculum for English specialist schools applying through the specialist schools programme. The initiative added an extra "dimension" of curriculum meant to give specialist school students an expanded "awareness and understanding of the countryside as a living, working environment". It was introduced to first-time specialist applications in October 2003 and to re-designation applications in 2004. The rural dimension focused on rural schools but was also seen as important to all schools, including those in urban areas. Therefore, urban and suburban schools were also granted the ability to apply to the initiative. The specialist schools programme was discontinued in 2011. Since then, schools with academy status may fund their own rural dimension as a specialism. Non-academy schools can no longer provide the rural dimension curriculum as they are bound to the National Curriculum.

== History ==
In April 2003, plans to "mainstream rural issues across all DfES policies" were discussed in the House of Commons. It was revealed by Labour MP Stephen Twigg that a new initiative was being developed by the DfES and Defra, hence the need to "mainstream rural issues" in order to ensure equality and fairness during its implementation. A "Rural Schools Group" was established by Twigg that consisted of school headteachers to oversee these plans alongside the DfES and Defra. The plans were to expand upon the Rural White Paper 2000, becoming part of the specialist schools programme. It was named the rural dimension initiative and was to originally complement the humanities specialism. On 20 June 2003, Twigg announced that from October 2003 any schools applying for specialist status could implement the rural dimension into their selected specialism. Subjects provided and expanded by the dimension included GCSE environmental science, GCSE geography, GCSE rural and agricultural science, GNVQ and GCSE leisure and tourism, and GNVQ land and environment. From 2004, specialist schools re-designating their status could also apply for the rural dimension. In 2005, plans for the creation of a new "rural network" of specialist schools were announced. This would become the Rural Network Headteachers Steering Group, holding its first meeting on 27 April 2005.

By 2005, the rural dimension included agricultural and horticultural education, animal care BTECs and GCSEs, and land management. Subjects in rural crafts, outdoor education and land-based studies were added in 2006 and that same year the 22 specialist school milestone was reached for the rural dimension. International links with schools were established, primarily with schools in Australia. 50 specialist schools were considering joining the rural dimension by 6 March 2006. This milestone was broken by 31 March 2010, with 53 specialist schools partaking in the rural dimension. The specialist schools programme was discontinued by the Cameron-Clegg coalition government in 2011. If a school currently wishes to provide the rural dimension curriculum they must become an academy and dedicate funding to the dimension as a specialism. Schools without academy status are bound to the National Curriculum and therefore cannot use the rural dimension.

== Curriculum ==
The rural dimension curriculum is meant to expand students' "awareness and understanding of the countryside as a living, working environment". This expansion of awareness and understanding centres around four main points:

- Land management (agricultural subjects)
- Environmental stewardship (environmental subjects)
- Rural business and livelihood (tourism, farming and leisurely activities)
- Natural and cultural heritage (the relationship between humans and the environment)

The following subjects were introduced or expanded as part of the curriculum.

Year introduced or expanded	Subject	Qualification
2003	Farming	BTEC
2003	Geography	GCSE
2003	Environmental science	GCSE
2003	Rural and agricultural science	GCSE
2003	Leisure and tourism	GCSE and GNVQ
2003	Land and environment	GNVQ
2005	Agricultural	GCSE
2005	Horticultural	GCSE
2005	Animal care	GCSE and BTEC
2005	Land management	GCSE
2006	Rural crafts	GCSE
2006	Outdoor education	GCSE
2006	Land-based studies	BTEC
2011	Climbing	GCSE

Schools using the rural dimension curriculum often have a farm on their site. Regional and local workshops are also hosted frequently.
