= Applied Learning College =

Type of vocational school in the UK

Applied Learning Colleges logo

Applied Learning Colleges, formerly Vocational Colleges, were introduced in 2006 as part of the Specialist Schools Programme in England. The system enabled secondary schools to specialise in certain fields, in this case, vocational education. Schools that successfully applied to the Specialist Schools Trust and became Applied Learning Colleges received extra funding from this joint private sector and government scheme. In order to fulfil the criteria for Applied Learning College status schools had to either be designated as a High Performing Specialist School or select it as part of a combined specialist when first specialising. By 2009, 164 schools had specialised into an Applied Learning College.

After the Specialist Schools Programme was discontinued in 2011, schools must now use their Dedicated Schools Grant or become an academy if they wish to receive this specialism.
