= Training school (United Kingdom) =

Type of school in England

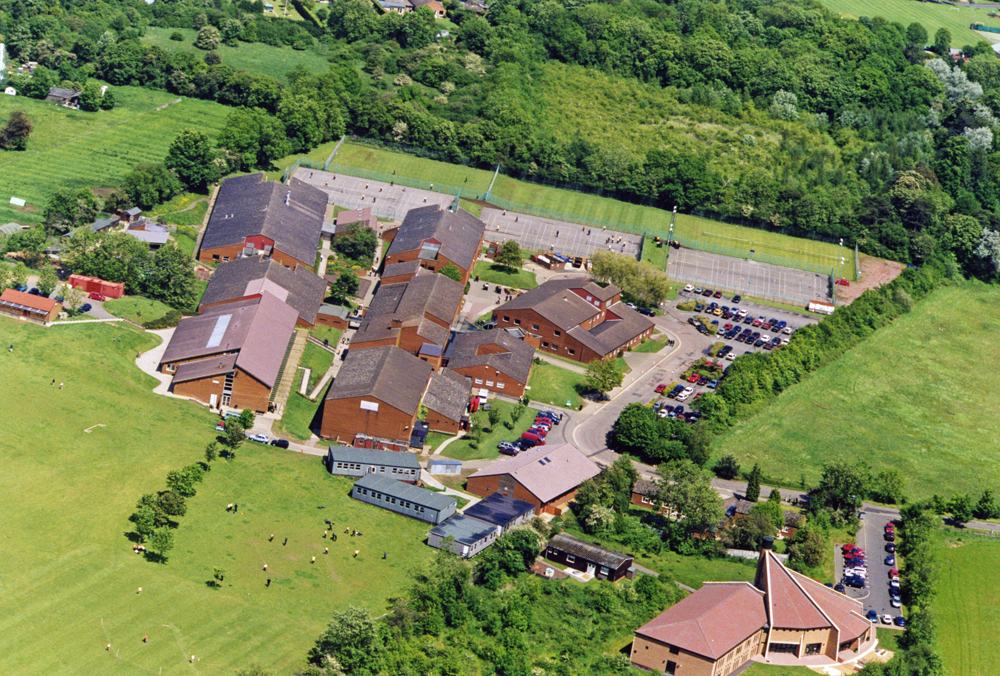
Aerial view of Sharnbrook Upper School

A training school was a type of specialist school in England that specialised in adult education and teacher training. They provided exceptional facilities for in-service and work experience training for teachers. There were around 230 training schools.

They were described "As centres of excellence for training, Training Schools act as experts in adult learning and the transfer of skills, and provide a venue for high quality professional development."

Initially, there was a requirement that a training school had to have High Performing Specialist Schools status. This requirement was removed in February 2010 to enable special schools to become training schools.

Training School designation is no longer in use, it was superseded in England by Specialist Teaching Schools, many working with other schools and strategic partners to form a Teaching School Alliance. The first cohort of 100 Teaching Schools across 97 Teaching School Alliances were designated for the beginning of the 2011–2012 academic year. Teaching Schools are themselves losing designation from 31 August 2021, with their role passing to regional Teaching School Hubs, of which there will be 87 across England.
