= Humanities College =

Type of British specialist school

Humanities Colleges logo

Humanities Colleges are a type of specialist school introduced in 2004 as part of the Specialist Schools Programme in the United Kingdom. The system enabled secondary and primary schools to specialise in certain fields, in this case, humanities (English, geography, history and RE). Schools that successfully applied to the Specialist Schools Trust and became Humanities Colleges received extra funding from this joint private sector and government scheme. Humanities Colleges act as a local point of reference for other schools and businesses in the area, with an emphasis on promoting humanities within the community.

Since the discontinuation of the Specialist Schools Programme schools must become academies or manage a Dedicated Schools Grant if they wish to specialise as a Humanities College.
