= Pesthouse Common, Richmond =

Park in Richmond upon Thames, London, England

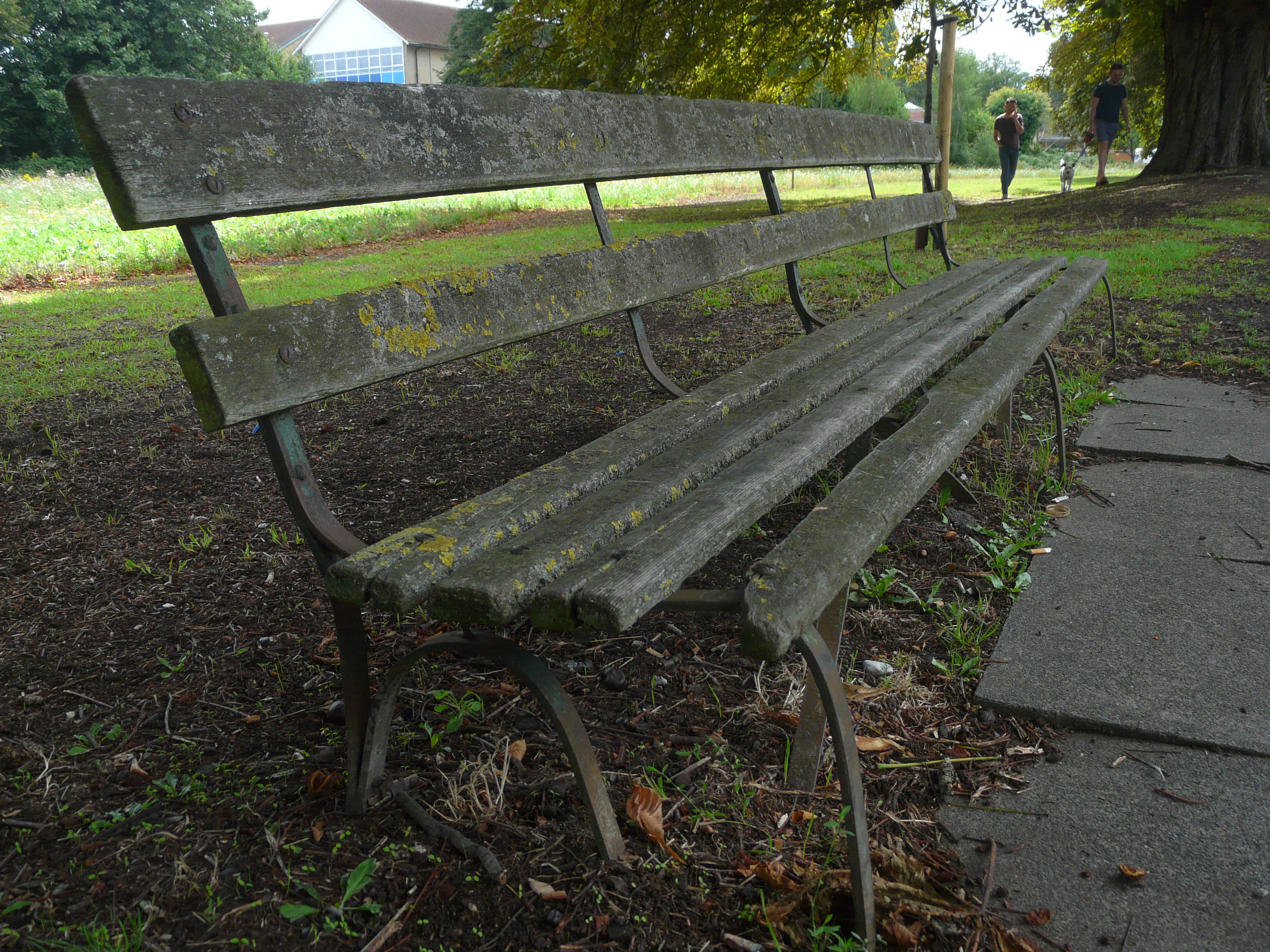
- Interactive map of Pesthouse Common, Richmond
- Type: Urban park
- Location: Queen's Road, Richmond TW10 6HF
- Coordinates: 51°27′35″N 0°17′19″W
- Area: 1.18 hectares (of which 0.93 hectares is registered common)
- Operator: Richmond upon Thames Borough Council as Trustees of the Richmond Parish Lands Charity
- Status: Open all year
- Website: Richmond upon Thames Borough Council's webpage on Pesthouse Common

Pesthouse Common, Richmond is an area of public open space on Queen's Road, Richmond in the London Borough of Richmond upon Thames. It is bordered by mature lime and horse chestnut trees and is managed by Richmond upon Thames London Borough Council to promote nature conservation.

== History ==
The common is so called as it had a pest house, a structure used for quarantining people with communicable diseases. The common, which used to belong to the Crown, originally extended from the bottom of Queen's Road to the gates of Richmond Park. It had, near the site of the present Lass o' Richmond Hill pub on Queen's Road, a "pound overt" (open pound). Goods or cattle belonging to those had failed to pay fines imposed by the local courts were put there.

A 1785 act of parliament granted the common to Richmond vestry, and it was then enclosed for a workhouse (Note: The workhouse was built just off Queen's Road in what is now Grove Road, Richmond, and was opened in 1787. It later became Grove Road Hospital but has now been converted to residential use. Higginbotham, Peter (2011). "Richmond, Surrey: Richmond Parish Workhouse". The history of the workhouse. The Workhouse.) and burial ground, except for a small portion next to the lower part of Queen's Road. The pest house itself was pulled down in 1787.

== See also ==
- Richmond Cemetery
