= New Civil Engineer =

British business magazine

- Cover of the September 2023 issue
- Editor: Gavin Pearson
- Deputy editor: Belinda Smart
- Former editors: Claire Smith
- Categories: Civil Engineering, Infrastructure, Construction, Rail, Roads, Bridges, Tunnels, Flooding, Water, Airports
- Frequency: Monthly
- Format: A4
- Circulation: 47,857 (2018)
- Publisher: Metropolis International
- Founder: Thomas Telford Publishing
- Founded: 1972
- First issue: May 1972
- Company: Metropolis International
- Country: United Kingdom
- Based in: London
- Language: English
- Website: newcivilengineer.com
- ISSN: 0307-7683
- OCLC: 1016388257

New Civil Engineer is the monthly magazine for members of the Institution of Civil Engineers (ICE), the UK chartered body that oversees the practice of civil engineering in the UK. First published in May 1972, it is today published by Metropolis. Under its previous publisher, Ascential, who, as Emap, acquired the title and editorial control from the ICE in 1995, the ICE regularly discussed the magazine's content through an editorial advisory board and a supervisory board.

Available in print and online after the appropriate subscription has been taken out (it is free for members of the ICE), the magazine is aimed at professionals in the civil engineering industry. It contains industry news and analysis, letters from subscribers, a directory of companies, with listings arranged by companies’ areas of work, and an appointments section. It also occasionally has details of university courses and graduate positions.

In 2013 it had a net circulation of more than 50,000 per issue. Two years later, this had dropped to 42,805, of which some 39,000 related to copies distributed to ICE members. Previously printed on a weekly basis the magazine switched to a monthly format in December 2015. New Civil Engineer was a co-founder of the British Construction Industry Awards.

In January 2017, Ascential announced its intention to sell 13 titles including New Civil Engineer; the 13 "heritage titles" were to be "hived off into a separate business while buyers are sought." The brands were purchased by Metropolis International Ltd (owner of the Property Week title since 2013) in a £23.5m cash deal, announced on 1 June 2017.

Jacqueline Whitelaw was the magazine's deputy editor from 1998 to 2009.
