= Leading Edge Partnership =

The Leading Edge Partnership programme was established in 2003 by the Department for Children, Schools and Families in the United Kingdom. The programme's intention was to encourage Secondary schools in England to work in partnership to solve some problems in education.

The programme encouraged schools to work to raise achievement through the sharing of proven ideas, and the lead school in each partnership received £60,000 per year to facilitate this. In September 2004 there were around 200 partnerships involving some 1100 schools.

== See also ==
- Specialist schools programme
