= Cyril Taylor (educationist) =

British educator and social entrepreneur (1935–2018)

Sir Cyril Taylor GBE
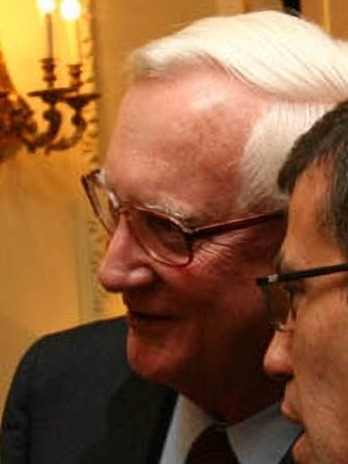
- Taylor in 2006

High Sheriff of Greater London
- In office 1996–1997
- Appointed by: Elizabeth II
- Preceded by: Graham Hearne
- Succeeded by: William Harrison

Deputy Leader of the Opposition for the Greater London Council
- In office 1983–1986
- Opposition leader: Alan Greengross
- Preceded by: Alan Greengross
- Succeeded by: Council abolished

Member of the Greater London Council for Ruislip-Northwood
- In office 1977–1986
- Preceded by: Bernard Brown
- Succeeded by: Council abolished
- Majority: 17,147 (30.9%)

Personal details
- Born: 14 May 1935 Leeds, Yorkshire, England
- Died: 29 January 2018 (aged 82) South Kensington, London, England
- Party: Conservative (until 1997); Independent (from 1997)
- Spouse: Judith Denman Taylor (m. 1965)
- Children: 1 daughter

Military service
- Branch/service: British Army
- Years of service: 1954–1956
- Rank: Second Lieutenant
- Unit: King's African Rifles
- Battles/wars: Mau Mau rebellion

Sir Cyril Julian Hebden Taylor (14 May 1935 – 29 January 2018) was a British educator and social entrepreneur, who founded the American Institute For Foreign Study (AIFS) in 1964. He served as an education reformer and special adviser to successive elected British Governments from 1987 to 2007 and founded the City Technology Colleges Trust, subsequently the Specialist Schools and Academies Trust (SSAT).

Taylor founded Richmond University, an American international university in London in 1971. The University is accredited in the United States and designated by the Department of Education of HM Government in the UK. Taylor was Chancellor of the university which has 1,200 students from 100 countries.

Taylor was appointed a director of Margaret Thatcher's Think Tank, the Centre for Policy Studies (CPS) and began his political career on the Greater London Council (GLC) as the member for Ruislip-Northwood. Following the abolition of the GLC in 1986, Taylor was called upon by Thatcher, Prime Minister, to assist with the emerging problem of rising youth unemployment. It was during this time that Taylor founded the City Technology Colleges Trust (CTCT), subsequently renamed the Specialist Schools Trust, and renamed again as the Specialist Schools and Academies Trust (SSAT) where he remained Chairman until 2007. Between 1987 until 2007, Taylor served as Education Adviser to ten successive Secretaries of State for Education on the Specialist Schools and Academies initiatives.

Taylor was appointed a Knight Bachelor in the 1989 Birthday Honours for services to education in recognition of the success of the CTC initiative. He was also made a Knight Grand Cross of The Most Excellent Order of the British Empire (GBE) for services to education in 2004. In 1996, Taylor, was appointed by Queen Elizabeth II as High Sheriff of Greater London.

== Early life and education ==
The youngest of six children, Cyril Julian Hebden Taylor was born in Leeds, Yorkshire, England on 14 May 1935. His parents, the Reverend Cyril Eustace Taylor and Marjorie Victoria Hebden Taylor, were Methodist missionaries in the Belgian Congo who helped establish 38 churches with a collective membership of more than 3,000 people by 1925. They married in Mwanza on 17 October 1923 and had their first child, a son, on 25 July 1925. The Reverend died from pneumonia in Switzerland four months before Taylor's birth in 1935, leaving Marjorie to raise him, his brother and his four sisters.

Taylor was six months old when his mother returned to the Belgian Congo. He joined her and spent his formative years there, learning the local Katangese language of Kiluba but no English. As a result of the Second World War, they returned to Leeds when Taylor was six, which is when he learned to speak English. In 1942, Taylor and his family lived together in Scarborough, Yorkshire, and then in Halifax, Yorkshire, from 1944. Taylor passed his eleven-plus examination and attended Heath Grammar School for one academic term, before moving back to Leeds and attending Roundhay Grammar School until 1947 when he moved to London. In London, Taylor attended St Marylebone Grammar School, where he stayed until 1954. In 2006, Taylor described Thomas Kingston Derry, his teacher at St Marylebone, as "probably the greatest influence on my life".

== National service and university ==
=== Kenya (National Service) ===
Taylor was called up for his two years National Service in 1954 where he applied for a commission and was trained as an officer. Taylor was commissioned as a Second Lieutenant and was granted a secondment to the King's African Rifles in Kenya during the Mau Mau emergency. He spent eighteen months as the Commander of Number 8 Platoon, C Company, in the 3rd Battalion of the King's African Rifles.

=== Trinity Hall, Cambridge University ===
Taylor left the army in March 1956, just prior to going up to Cambridge University and took a teaching job for a term at a private boarding school. In October 1956, Taylor took his place at Trinity Hall, Cambridge to read History. During his time at Cambridge, Taylor became good friends with reporter Mark Tully and Parviz C. Radji. Taylor's personal tutor was The Reverend Robert Runcie, who became Archbishop of Canterbury and who encouraged and supported Taylor's application to Harvard Business School and who would later recommend Taylor to the Prime Minister, Margaret Thatcher.

== United States ==
=== Harvard Business School ===
In 1957 Taylor assisted a friend at Cambridge, Miles Halford, who had chartered two DC6 aeroplanes to fly fellow students who wanted to work their summer university break in North America and Canada. After working the summer of 1957 in Temiscaming, Quebec where his brother Stacey was the Anglican vicar Taylor ended his trip with a visit to Harvard Business School which influenced his decision to apply to study at Harvard and join the Harvard MBA programme. After graduating from Cambridge with a second-class honours degree, he was accepted onto the MBA programme by Harvard Business School in September 1959, majoring in Entrepreneurial studies in his final year. After graduation, Taylor was offered a job by Procter & Gamble in the Marketing Department where he worked from 1961 to 1964.

=== Procter & Gamble ===
Whilst working at Procter & Gamble, Taylor met and later married, French language teacher, Judy Denman. It was when Taylor helped Denman to organise an educational trip for her pupils to France, to learn French, that he came up with the idea of the American Institute For Foreign Study (AIFS). Taylor saw there was an untapped market for school trips abroad led by teachers and so spent his two-week Procter & Gamble vacation in August 1964 setting up summer study abroad programmes for high school students at universities in European cities. This led to Taylor leaving Procter & Gamble in September 1964 to focus on this new enterprise and together with Roger Walther and Doug Burck, two other Brand Managers from Procter & Gamble, the AIFS was established.

== American Institute for Foreign Study (AIFS) ==
=== Foundation of AIFS ===
Taylor founded the American Institute For Foreign Study (AIFS) in 1964. From 1965 to 1968 the AIFS high school programme grew rapidly to nearly 5,000 students with many new summer campuses opening including, in the United Kingdom, at universities such as St Andrews University, Durham University and even Oxford University and Cambridge University.

In 1969, Taylor and his two partners sold AIFS to the National Student Marketing Corporation (NSMC). NSMC went public in the 1970s and Taylor and his partners bought back AIFS from NSMC in 1977. As part of the purchase Camp America was acquired, originally called Rural Britannia. This led to thousands of British and other foreign students travelling to the USA to work as camp counsellors during their summer vacations. Au Pair in America was formed in 1986, and signed into statute by President Bill Clinton. There have since that time been over 90,000 participants.

AIFS was floated on the American Stock Exchange in 1986 but was later re-acquired by Taylor and his partner Roger Walther in 1990. In 1993, AIFS was split as Walther wished to concentrate on other business ventures on the West Coast, with the ELS becoming a separate company under Walther's direction.

Taylor remained actively involved with AIFS as its chairman. AIFS recently celebrated the enrolment of its 1,500,000th student and celebrated its 50th anniversary in 2014.

== Political career ==
=== Starting out in politics ===
Taylor was drawn towards the UK's Conservative Party politics. Taylor chaired Trinity Hall's Conservative Association and he participated in the Cambridge Union Society. In April 1970, Taylor joined the Kensington Conservative Association and was elected deputy chairman of the new combined Kensington and Chelsea (UK Parliament constituency) on the recommendation of the then chairman, Cllr George Pole. Taylor helped Conservative Spencer Le Marchant win the Labour held marginal High Peak seat in Derbyshire in the 1970 General Election. The experiences of the Derbyshire campaign helped him to become the Conservative's candidate to contest the Huddersfield East seat in 1973. Taylor lost to Labour who regained power in 1974, but as Harold Wilson did not have a working majority in parliament, he called another election for October 1974 which he lost narrowly. Taylor had the opportunity to stand for another Labour marginal seat in Keighley which he lost by 3,081 votes. However, Taylor wanted was a safer seat near to London that would work well with his professional career and also to fit with his family life and so he resigned as the candidate for Keighley after the election.

=== Greater London Council (GLC) ===
Taylor began to look at other ways to serve in a public capacity. In 1977 he was given the opportunity to stand as the Greater London Council (GLC) Conservative candidate for Ruislip-Northwood and won a significant victory.

From 1977 until 1986, Taylor served as the member of the GLC for Ruislip-Northwood. Sir Horace Cutler, appointed Taylor to be the chairman of the council's Professional and General Services Committee, which supervised the employment of 25,000 GLC staff. During his time at the GLC, Taylor was concerned with getting better value from public spending and wrote a paper called The Elected Member's Guide to Reducing Public Expenditure.

The Conservatives lost power to Ken Livingstone, Labour, in 1981. However, under Ken Livingstone's leadership, Margaret Thatcher abolished the GLC in 1986, together with Taylor's role as a Conservative councillor. Taylor did not agree with Margaret Thatcher's decision to abolish the GLC and made his views public in a Bow Group paper "London Preserved". Margaret Thatcher referred to Taylor as a 'wet', which was seen as one of the strongest forms of abuse for a Conservative at the time. Taylor was elected deputy leader of the Conservative Councillors in 1985. However, Margaret Thatcher later called upon Taylor to assist her with the growing youth unemployment problem of the 1980s.

== Specialist schools and academies ==
=== City Technology Colleges (CTCs) ===
In 1986 Taylor was still a director of Margaret Thatcher's Think Tank, the Centre for Policy Studies (CPS) and regardless of her views on Taylor's opposition to her abolition of the GLC, he was asked to organise an all day CPS conference at the House of Lords to discuss the growing youth unemployment issue. It was from this conference that the idea of City Technology College (CTC) was born with the intention of using private sector and state support to set up the colleges to provide free education to children in urban areas, focused on modern technology. The idea was announced by Education Secretary, Kenneth Baker, Baron Baker of Dorking, at the Conservative Party Conference in Bournemouth October 1986. Taylor was then appointed as special adviser to organise the project and in May 1987 established the City Technology Colleges Trust (CTCT). The Trust gathered together leading figures from both industry and education as sponsors and between 1987 and 1993, £44 million of sponsorship was raised.

The CTCT model was expensive for sponsors and so had to be changed as it was being developed. Taylor suggested an alternative, less expensive option involving converting existing comprehensive schools to specialist technology colleges. There was still an element of industry sponsorship, but at £100,000 this was much less than the £2 million previously required. The government would also provide match industry funding. The new CTCs needed to show how they would raise standards using their new technology specialisms. This new option was strongly supported by the new prime minister, John Major, who had succeeded Margaret Thatcher in 1990.

=== Special adviser to ten successive Secretaries of State for Education ===
Taylor remained specialist adviser to Kenneth Baker's four Conservative successors: John MacGregor; Kenneth Clarke; John Patten and Gillian Shepherd. It was through Gillian Shepherd's enthusiasm and support that Taylor met with Prime Minister John Major to discuss how to include all schools as potential CTCs rather than remain limited to technology colleges who, on hearing the ideas being put forward, backed Taylor's proposals.

The Conservatives lost the 1997 General Election to Labour after seventeen years in power. Taylor sought the support of the Labour Government so that his educational reforms through CTCs and the raising of standards in specialist schools could continue. David Blunkett, Secretary of State for Education from 1997 to 2001, supported Taylor's ideas and together with Conor Ryan, who was David Blunkett's key adviser on schools, the specialist schools programme continued.

In 1997, Labour was re-elected and Taylor was reappointed as specialist adviser by David Blunkett, who was promoted to Home Secretary in 2001. Estelle Morris became Education Secretary, who was then succeeded by Charles Clarke when she stepped down. Charles Clarke then became Home Secretary and Ruth Kelly took his place as Education Secretary, Alan Johnson reappointed Taylor in 2006. All supported the Specialist Schools and Academies Trust (SSAT) programme, as it was now known, which had grown rapidly from 245 in 1997 to 700 by 2001 and by 2009 the number stood at over 3,000.

Taylor remained at the helm of the Specialist Schools and Academies Trust (SSAT) as a special adviser for education from 1987 until 2007 where he served ten Education Secretaries from both Conservative and Labour governments.

== Personal life ==
=== Family ===
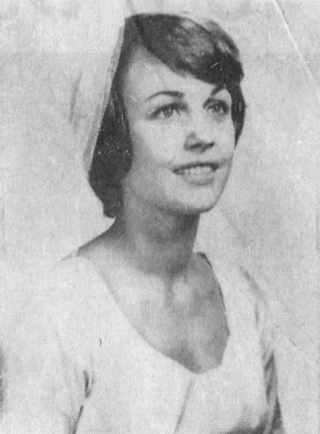
Taylor married June Judith Denman in 1965

Taylor married June Judith Denman, a teacher at Glen Este High School, at the Calvary Episcopal Church on 5 June 1965. They had one daughter.

=== Lexham Gardens, London ===
Taylor purchased the freehold of a one-acre garden square, near to his London home, Lexham Gardens, Kensington, by auction in 1989. With the assistance of designer Wilf Simms, he redesigned and replanted the garden. This saved it from the hands of property developers who wanted to build a car park underneath. In the garden’s first summer of 1991, it was awarded first prize in the All London Garden Squares Competition, competing against entries from 100 other squares.

=== Death ===
Taylor died unexpectedly on 29 January 2018, at his home at 1 Lexham Walk, South Kensington, London. He was survived by his daughter Kirsten and his wife Judith, who, having suffered from an illness, died eight days later. Through his will, Taylor donated most of his £200 million estate to the Cyril Taylor Charitable Foundation, while his daughter inherited an apartment in New York. The foundation funds the Sir Cyril Taylor Memorial Award for Social Entrepreneurship, a Fulbright Commission scholarship that helps students from the United Kingdom study a master's degree at any desired university in America. It was created to commemorate Taylor's work and life.

== Awards ==
=== Knighthoods ===
Taylor was honoured in 1989 when Lord Baker recommended Taylor be made a Knight Bachelor in the 1989 Birthday Honours for services to education in recognition of the success of the CTC initiative.

In 2004, Tony Blair recommended that Taylor be given the honour of Knight Grand Cross of the Most Excellent Order of the British Empire (GBE) for services to education.

=== High Sheriff of Greater London ===
After the abolition of the GLC in 1986, Taylor was appointed by Her Majesty the Queen as High Sheriff of Greater London for one year. During this time, Taylor's interest in the welfare and education of young people, led him to focus his attention on how to improve the treatment of young offenders as well as looking at how to reduce crime committed by young people especially by those who had been children in care.

=== Honorary citizenship ===
Awarded Honorary citizenship by the Mayor of Harrisburg, Pennsylvania, June 2009 for services to education.

=== Honorary doctorates ===
Honorary Degrees

Location	Date	School	Degree
New Hampshire	1991	New England College	Doctorate
England	1997	Richmond, The American International University in London	Doctor of Laws (LL.D)
England	16 December 2000	Open University	Doctor of the University (D.Univ)
England	2005	Brunel University London	Doctor of Education (D.Ed)

=== Fellowships ===
Fellow of the Royal Society of Arts

== Books and publications ==
- Taylor, Sir Cyril (2013). My Life as a Social Entrepreneur. Amberley. ISBN 978-1-4456-1192-1.
- Taylor, Sir Cyril (2009). How English Universities could learn from the US Higher Education System. Institute for Economic Affairs. ISBN 978-0-255-36643-4.
- Taylor, Sir Cyril (2009). A Good School for Every Child. Routledge.
- Taylor, Sir Cyril; Blair, Tony; Reid, Elizabeth (2007). Education Education Education: 10 years on. Specialist Schools & Academies Trust.
- Taylor, Sir Cyril (2006). Who will champion our vulnerable children. Specialist Schools & Academies Trust.
- Taylor, Sir Cyril; Ryan, Conor (2005). Excellence in Education: the making of great schools. David Fulton Publishers.
- Taylor, Sir Cyril; Jesson, David; Ware, Jane (1997). Educational outcomes and value added by specialist schools: Analysis. Specialist Schools and Academies Trust. ISBN 1-873882-88-2.
- Taylor, Sir Cyril (1996). The Future of Higher Education. Conservative Political Centre.
- Taylor, Sir Cyril (1990). Raising Educational Standards: a personal perspective. Centre for Policy Studies. ISBN 1-870265-61-0.
- Taylor, Sir Cyril (1986). Employment Examined: the Right approach to more jobs. Centre for Policy Studies. ISBN 0-905880-82-X.
- Taylor, Sir Cyril (1985). Bringing accountability back to local government. Centre for Policy Studies.
- Taylor, Sir Cyril (1985). London Preserv'd. Bow Group.
- Taylor, Sir Cyril (1984). Reforming London's Government. Bow Group.
- Taylor, Sir Cyril (1982). A Realistic Plan for London Transport. Bow Group.
- Taylor, Sir Cyril (1980). The Elected Member's Guide to Reducing Public Expenditure. CPC.
- Taylor, Sir Cyril; Walters, Alan; Lilley, Peter (1974). No More Tick. Bow Group.
- Taylor, Sir Cyril (1972). Peace has its Price. CPC.
- Taylor, Sir Cyril; Garraty, John; von Klemperer, Lily (1974). The Guide to Study Abroad. Harper & Row.
