= Specialist schools programme =

UK Government programme for schools

- Number of specialist designations in England by year and first specialism from 1994 to 2009 (excluding SEN and Applied Learning Colleges)
- Date: September 1993 – April 2011 (England); September 2006 – August 2011 (Northern Ireland)
- Duration: 18 years
- Location: England and Northern Ireland
- Cause: Suspension of the City Technology Colleges programme
- Target: Specialisation of state schools to boost achievement, cooperation and diversity (England and Northern Ireland); Replacement of the comprehensive school system with a specialist school system (England)
- Budget: £450 million (2010/2011)
- Participants: 3068 schools designated in England by 2010; 44 schools designated in Northern Ireland by 2011
- Outcome: Near-universal specialist secondary system established in England; 96.6% of English state-funded secondary schools were designated with specialist status
- Website: standards.dfes.gov.uk/specialistschools

The specialist schools programme (SSP), first launched as the Technology Colleges programme and also known as the specialist schools initiative, specialist schools policy and specialist schools scheme, was a government programme in the United Kingdom which encouraged state schools (Note: The government offered an annual sum of £60,000 to private schools so that they could specialise in the programme.) (Note: The programme was intended for secondary schools. From 2003, middle and upper schools could jointly participate. English primary schools joined the programme in a four-year pilot that was launched in 2007.) in England and Northern Ireland to raise private sponsorship in order to become specialist schools – schools that specialise in certain areas of the curriculum – to boost achievement, cooperation and diversity in the school system. First introduced in 1993 to England as a policy of John Major's Conservative government, it was relaunched in 1997 as a flagship policy of the New Labour governments, expanding significantly under Prime Minister Tony Blair and his successor Gordon Brown. The programme was introduced to Northern Ireland in 2006, lasting until April 2011 in England and August 2011 in Northern Ireland. By this time, it had established a near-universal specialist system of secondary education in England, with almost every state-funded secondary school in England having specialised. This system replaced the comprehensive system which had been in place since the 1970s.

Under the programme, schools wishing to specialise had to be designated specialist in a subject specialism. After designating, specialist schools then benefitted from a grant of £100,000 and an annual extra £129 per pupil for four years, re-designating their status when this period expired. Re-designating schools could apply for a second specialism and high performing specialist school designation, which gave them more funding. Designation originally required schools to raise between £20,000 and £50,000 in private sector sponsorship, however the process was modified in 2010, making sponsorship optional. Schools without sponsorship did not receive the money granted to other specialist schools. Sponsorship was also optional for re-designating schools, but those who chose not to raise any still kept their specialist funding. Since the programme's abolition, schools no longer need to designate or re-designate for specialist status, however the extra funding granted after gaining this status is no longer available.

Two organisations, the Specialist Schools and Academies Trust (SSAT) (Note: Previously called the Specialist Schools Trust (2005–2003), Technology Colleges Trust (2003–1996), and City Technology Colleges Trust (1996–1987)) and Youth Sport Trust (YST), were funded by the Department for Education (Note: Previously called the Department for Children, Schools and Families (2010–2007), Department for Education and Skills (2007–2001), Department for Education and Employment (2001–1995) and, again, the Department for Education (1995–1992)) to help schools raise sponsorship and support them through the programme's designation and re-designation process. A number of high-profile individuals and organisations sponsored schools in the programme, such as Evelyn de Rothschild and Microsoft. Sponsors could sit on the governing bodies of these schools. The SSAT was also the Department's main advisory body on the programme, managing and delivering it on the Department's behalf; its long-time chairman Sir Cyril Taylor advised multiple education secretaries on the programme and influenced much of its development. The trust was an umbrella organisation for specialist schools and also managed the government's specialist schools network, a collaborative partnership made for the programme that included all of the country's state specialist schools, including those designated through the programme, City Technology Colleges and academy schools. The network was used to share schools' skills and turn its members into centres of excellence, and was thought by the trust to be the largest school network in the world. It was defunded and abolished after the 2010 Comprehensive Spending Review.

== Early years ==
=== Creation and implementation: 1993–1997 ===
The Education Reform Act 1988 introduced a new compulsory subject of technology, but there were insufficient funds to equip all schools to teach the subject. A first attempt at developing specialist schools to solve this issue, the City Technology Colleges (CTC) programme between 1988 and 1993, had produced only 15 schools despite an initial aim of 200, and had to be suspended after the recent recession. Prime Minister John Major and his education secretary John Patten approached the programme's pioneer Sir Cyril Taylor, and tasked him with finding a cost-effective way to turn existing schools into institutions similar to CTCs. Taylor proposed the creation of the specialist Technology College, which was in turn proposed by the government's Department for Education (DfE) in the 1993 education white paper Technology colleges: schools for the future. Established from already existing secondary schools, they would raise and receive £100,000 through sponsorship, benefit from an extra £100 per pupil every year and specialise in mathematics, technology and science. They would also have sponsors in their governing bodies. It was intended that they would further the CTC programme's impact and add diversity to the school system.

The resulting Technology Colleges programme was launched in September 1993 with the stated intent of promoting technology, allowing schools with voluntary aided and grant-maintained status to apply for Technology College designation after raising the required £100,000 in private sponsorship. If accepted, schools with Technology College status then received the extra funding as promised in the white paper and had to spend it towards their specialism over a three-year period, re-designating after this period had expired. Schools had already begun specialising in technology under the Technology Schools Initiative (TSI) launched a year prior.

Sir Cyril Taylor became the government's advisor on the programme, serving in this position under ten consecutive education secretaries. His educational trust, the City Technology Colleges Trust, was given a similar position as the DfE's main advisory body on the programme. It managed and delivered the programme on the Department's behalf, receiving funds from it to help schools raise the required sponsorship for specialist designation. These factors gave Taylor a significant amount of influence over much of the programme's development and he would later be described as the programme's architect, leader, head and initiator.

The first 12 Technology Colleges were designated in March 1994, joining the government's newly-established specialist schools network. Made for the new programme, this network was a collaborative partnership of state specialist schools led by the 15 specialist CTCs. It had previously included the TSI's 220 Technology Schools, although the TSI was scrapped sometime before the first Technology Colleges were designated. All specialist schools designated in the new programme were part of this network, which, like the new programme, was managed by the CTC Trust. The trust used the network to help schools share their skills and turn its members into centres of excellence. It would later become, according to the trust, the world's largest school network. Specialist schools also became members of the trust, which was an umbrella organisation for all of these schools.

With the first designations, Education Secretary John Patten announced plans to introduce more specialist schools in art, sport, music, language and business. The Technology Colleges were a trial of these plans and Patten expected to see 160 more designated over the next few years. Teachers opposed the programme as schools controlled by local government were unable to participate, with critics claiming that it aimed to incentivise schools to opt-out of their control. Officially, participation was restricted to voluntary aided and grant-maintained schools because of their favourable administrative style, which included provisions for sponsor governors. Other critics accused the programme of covertly introducing selection in schools, as grant-maintained and voluntary aided schools could select 10% of their pupils in specialist aptitude.

Between 1993 and 1995, the programme developed as the specialist schools programme and was opened up to schools under local government control on the orders of Gillian Shephard, the new education secretary. Shephard introduced specialist schools in language as planned and moved towards increasing specialist selection, a move criticised by unions but welcomed by the Labour Party, the opposition to the Conservative government. By this time, there were 30 schools specialising in language and 151 schools specialising in technology, excluding the 15 City Technology Colleges.

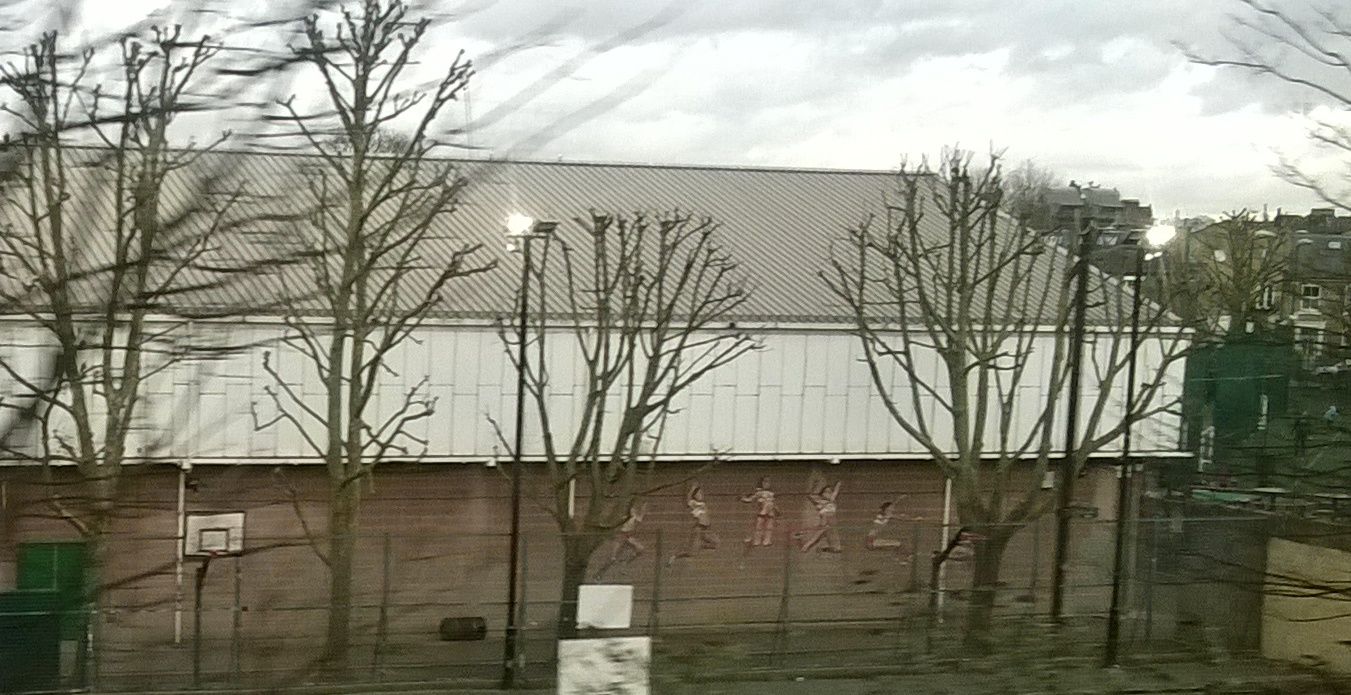
Chestnut Grove Academy was the first specialist Visual Arts College

In the 1996 education white paper Self-Government for Schools, art and sport specialisms were confirmed and a target was set for a total of 250 specialist schools by 1997. The ability for specialist schools to select 10% of their pupils was planned to be modified to 30%. Despite this, Education Secretary Gillian Shephard maintained that she was more interested in specialisation than selection. The art and sport specialisms were brought to the programme by Education Undersecretary Cheryl Gillan, which was something she considered to be one of her proudest achievements in politics. Unlike the programme's other specialisms, Sports Colleges were supported by the Youth Sport Trust (YST). It took on the CTC Trust's task of helping schools raise the required sponsorship for specialist designation in sport and, like the CTC Trust, was funded by the DfE to do so. The first designations in the art and sport specialisms were awarded to schools in early 1997.

=== Run-up to the 1997 general election ===
By the end of 1996, 182 specialist schools had been designated, with the majority of them being Technology Colleges. In light of this, the CTC Trust was renamed the Technology Colleges Trust (TCT). At this time, the trust began working to ensure the programme's continuation beyond the incoming 1997 general election; it was expected that Labour would win the election, resulting in a change of government.

Historically a left-wing party, Labour advocated the comprehensive system of schools, a system which opposed the specialist schools programme's values of school selection and diversity, and some expected that they would abolish the programme upon being elected. However, its leader Tony Blair had moved the party to the right under his New Labour project. Now a centrist party, Labour dropped many of their social democratic principles, including the defence of comprehensive education. Although, much of its membership opposed the programme in 1993 and 1994, some leading figures began expressing support once schools under local government control were allowed to participate. This was reiterated at the 1996 Labour Party Conference held in September and October, where it was announced that the programme would be supported as long as all state schools were allowed to participate.

According to his adviser Conor Ryan, Shadow Education Secretary David Blunkett had supported specialist schools since February 1996. Blunkett denounced comprehensives as failed schools a month later and stated his goal to reform them, while keeping the "comprehensive ideal". One of his proposals for reform was to establish "families" of close by specialist schools that specialised in different subjects, thereby allowing pupils to move between them. This proposal received mixed reactions, with some supporting it as long as these groups were not selective and others wanting ability grouping in individual schools instead. In the same year, Blunkett developed a friendship with Cyril Taylor during the latter's visit to his son's school. He offered Blunkett his support should he successfully become education secretary. Estelle Morris, Labour's spokeswoman for schools, also supported specialist schools, having previously taught at one herself.

Although Labour had expressed support for specialist schools, the party still made no promises to extend the coinciding programme. In December 1996, Leader of the Labour Party Tony Blair was scheduled to open Carmel RC Technology College. Taylor joined Blair and his adviser Tim Allan on the train ride to the school, where they discussed the programme for an hour. Blair questioned Taylor about school sponsorship, improvement and enrolment and specialist school cooperation. Taylor presented research produced by the TCT claiming that Technology Colleges outperformed non-specialist schools. This, alongside Blair's good impression of Carmel RC Technology College, led to the implementation of the programme's expansion as Labour policy.

Both major political parties pledged to continue the programme in their election campaigns. The Conservatives originally proposed allowing comprehensives to designate as new grammar schools through the programme, however this was abandoned due to conflict within the party. They also promised to designate 900 more specialist schools by 2001. Tony Blair's counter-proposal was to lower this number to 300 and to redirect some of the programme's funding to urban areas. However, David Blunkett wanted another 1000 specialist schools designated. He, in response to the Conservatives' plans to introduce grammar school designation, called them "totally confused" over their education policy. Blair echoed similar sentiments, calling the party's execution of the programme "unplanned and incoherent". Blair promised to make supporting other local schools a requirement for specialist schools if they wished to receive additional funding for equipment. Sources from the party said this local support would invalidate the controversy surrounding specialist schools' right to a partially selective intake and promised that this right would be maintained. Planned Conservative spending for the programme was also criticised by Labour, as the cost would far exceed the programme's budget.

== Relaunch and expansion ==
=== Entry into mainstream education: 1997–2002 ===
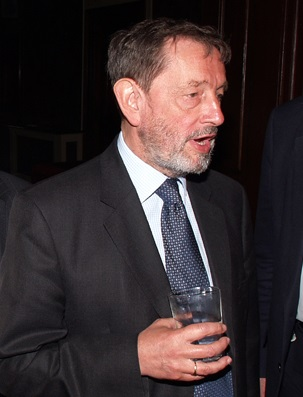
Education Secretary David Blunkett's tenure coincided with the programme's entry into the mainstream education system

After the May 1997 general election, Labour entered government, with the Conservatives entering opposition. One of New Labour's priorities in government was "education, education, education". This included the diversification of the school system and the replacement of the "bog standard comprehensive" by specialist schools. The specialist schools programme was relaunched in July, with an emphasis on school cooperation, achievement and diversity, and a new long-term goal of having all secondary schools secure specialist status was set. The programme became one of the New Labour government's flagship policies and Tony Blair, who was now prime minister, aimed to have another 450 specialist schools designated by the end of his first parliamentary session.

David Blunkett, who was now education secretary, planned to modernise state education by introducing more specialist schools, thereby providing greater diversity in the school system. He introduced the compulsory requirement for specialist schools to share their additional resources with nearby schools. This was known as the "community dimension" and specialist schools had to allocate a third of their funding to it. The dimension also covered their partnerships with these schools, as well as local institutions of further and higher education and local businesses. Blunkett's tenure as education secretary from 1997 to 2001 coincided with the programme's entry into the mainstream education system.

The 1997 education white paper Excellence in Schools introduced policies that would be enacted by the School Standards and Framework Act 1998. These policies included the establishment of Education Action Zones; socially disadvantaged areas where specialisation bids were given preferential treatment over those located elsewhere, and the reinforcement of specialist selection, whereby specialist schools were able to select up to 10% of their intake on aptitude in the existing specialisms of sports, arts, languages and technology. Few specialist schools took up this option, yet many accused the government of covertly reintroducing selection, just as they did under the previous Conservative administration.

From 1999, the required amount of private sponsorship for bidding schools was halved, and could be made up of goods and services in lieu of cash. Software donations were, however, ineligible because of the difficulty in evaluating the true value of something that had no manufacturing cost and could simply be given away as a form of collateral, but this changed when Oracle and then Microsoft were allowed to sponsor the programme with "in kind" donations. The government also began funding schools unable to afford sponsorship and gave specialist schools another £20,000 to encourage school cooperation. By this time there were 365 specialist schools, 242 were Technology Colleges, 61 Language Colleges, 33 Sports Colleges and 29 Arts Colleges, with plans to reach a total of 500 specialist schools by 2001.

In January 2000, Prime Minister Tony Blair announced a realignment of policy from primary education to secondary education, with a focus on the state sector. Another wave of specialist schools would be announced, with the first stage introducing another 36 Language and Technology Colleges. As planned, the total amount of specialist schools was expected to reach 500 in September, and plans for another 300 by 2003 were announced. This would be a total of 800 specialist schools, which was a quarter of the state secondary schools in England at the time. This expansion was welcomed by Liberal Democrat Shadow Education Minister Phil Willis and also by the Conservative Party.

After the 2001 general election, the second Blair ministry published their education white paper Schools Achieving Success and David Blunkett was replaced as education secretary by Estelle Morris. Morris criticised the comprehensive school system and wanted to continue the previous goal of expanding school diversity through having more specialist schools. Schools Achieving Success envisaged the expansion of the programme to 1500 secondary schools, which was half of all secondary schools, by 2005. It also introduced, through the ensuing Education Act 2002, new specialisms in business and enterprise, mathematics and computing, engineering and science. Combined specialisms were also introduced and schools failing to designate were offered working towards status, granting them further government support for specialisation. Advanced specialist status was also introduced, with Morris inviting 300 of the top performing specialist schools to become advanced in 2002. Advanced specialist schools were training schools that aimed to improve underachieving comprehensive schools. They were led by the first executive headteachers, super-heads noted for their successful leadership of secondary schools.

At this time there were growing concerns from Liberal Democrat MPs, Labour backbenchers and teaching unions that the programme was introducing a two-tier education system made up of partially selective specialist schools with extra funding and comprehensive schools which could not have benefited from any extra money. It was believed that schools located in poorer areas would be unable to raise the required sponsorship for specialist status, although the TCT reported that almost a third of specialist schools were located in inner cities. Mike Baker of the BBC reported that a hierarchal "ladder" of schools was being established, in which the "higher they climb, the bigger the prizes they collect". It was worried that some schools, especially those in rural areas, would be left behind while others reaped the benefits of specialist status. Prime Minister Tony Blair dismissed these concerns as "groundless", arguing that specialist status would instead increase social equality. There was also confusion between specialist schools designated in the programme, traditional specialist schools such as music schools and special schools that served pupils with special needs.

=== Specialist majority and reforms: 2002–2007 ===
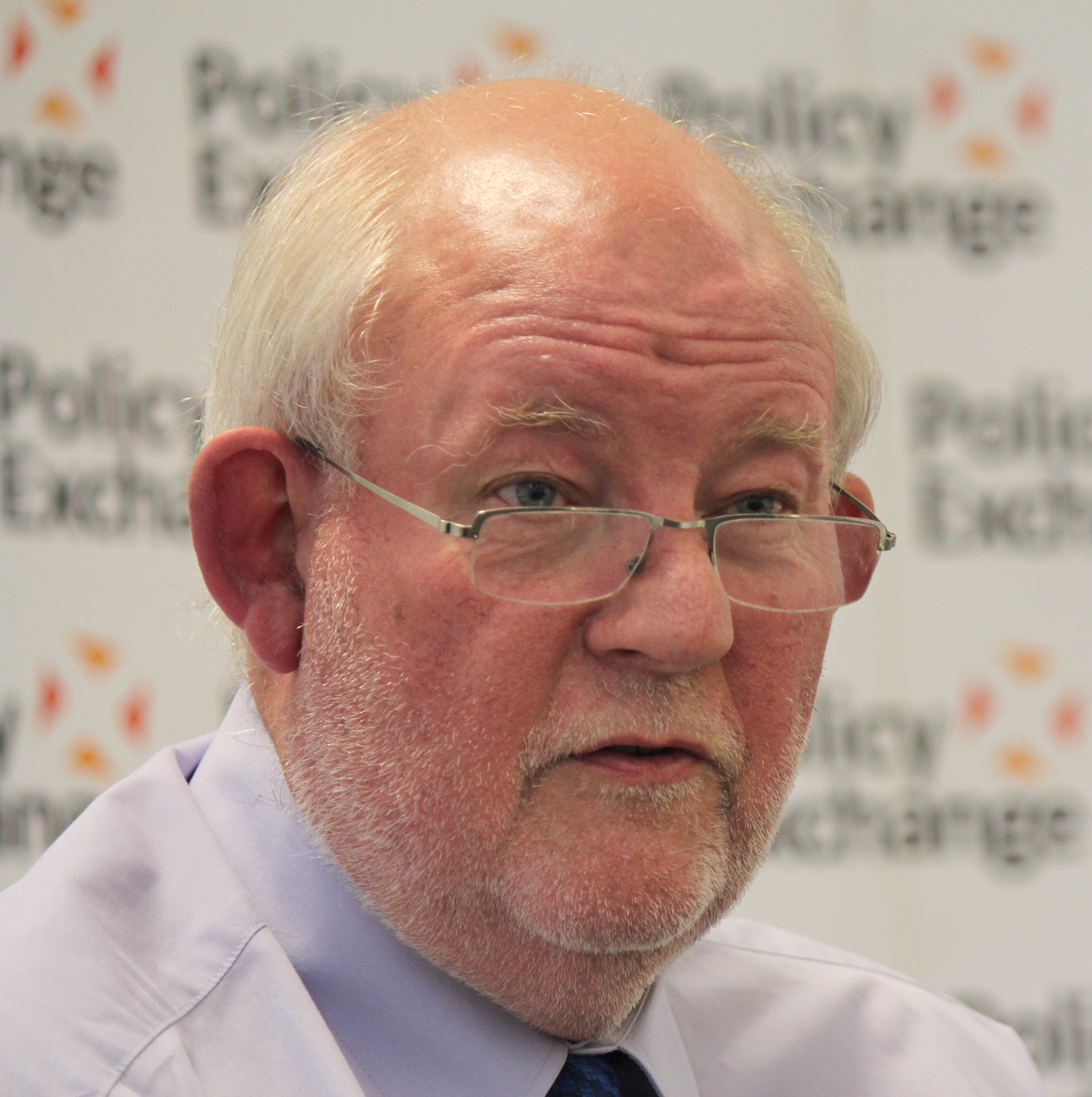
Charles Clarke reformed the programme to establish a new specialist system in England. He wanted every secondary school in England to specialise and was education secretary when the majority had done so in January 2004

Morris resigned from her position in October 2002 and Charles Clarke became the new education secretary. Clarke discontinued advanced specialist status, announced his intention for all secondary schools in England to be specialist and "raised the cap" for specialist designations, allowing all schools with satisfactory sponsorships to specialise (previously a limited number of schools were designated each round). A new target of 2000 specialist schools was set for 2006, with there being 992 specialist schools in September 2002. He also introduced the Partnership Fund, funded at £3 million per annum, to make up the shortfall for schools that were unable to raise the required £50,000 of private sponsorship. 20–25% of designated schools utilised this scheme. These reforms were done to avoid a two-tier education system and implement a new specialist school system in England, thereby replacing the comprehensive system already in place. This new system would focus on boosting educational diversity and equality, and would encourage school cooperation, innovation and improvement. It would also emphasise school independence and accountability.

To better reflect the increased amount of specialisms now available, the Technology Colleges Trust was renamed to the Specialist Schools Trust (SST) in 2003. That year, further specialisms in music and the humanities were introduced and schools were invited to add a curricular rural dimension to their designation bids. The dimension was made available to re-designations in 2004. High performing specialist status was introduced in 2004 when 69 specialist schools were invited to establish a second specialism. Unlike combined specialisms, second specialisms were not gifted upon first designation and instead came with re-designation. Initially, they were only offered to the high performing specialist schools, alongside the ability to gain training school status and new exclusive vocational and SEN specialisms, however second specialisms were offered to normal specialist schools later that year. The SEN specialism also lost its exclusivity, with 12 special schools gaining the specialism from December 2004. In contrast to the third of funding dedicated in other specialist schools, SEN Colleges had to dedicate half of their additional funding to the community dimension. They did however receive another exclusive £60,000.

In January 2004, Minister for School Standards David Miliband announced that the majority of secondary schools in England, exactly 54%, had attained specialist status. Another announcement in July, made by Education Secretary Charles Clarke, revealed that over 62% of secondaries were now specialist, with another 268 being designated, bringing the total number of specialist schools to 1954. This was the largest expansion of specialist schools to date and meant that the aim for a total of 2000 by 2006 was likely to be met two years earlier than expected. Clarke also released an educational "five-year plan" that aimed to have all English secondaries be specialist by 2008, with at least one serving every community. The plan also reinforced the government's goal of establishing a specialist system with increased school independence from local government authorities and the central government in Whitehall.

At this time, in a bid to increase parental choice, Conservative Shadow Education Secretary Tim Yeo planned to expand the specialist schools programme by implementing within it a "pupil passport scheme". The scheme would allow all schools, including state schools, to become fully selective. Schools would also be disallowed from accepting students based on their proximity to them and from refusing students who lived outside their catchment areas. Other policies that would be part of the scheme included the introduction of academy status grammar schools and individualised student funding that would follow them throughout their education.

In 2005 the SST was given oversight over the academies programme, thereafter becoming the Specialist Schools and Academies Trust (SSAT). Academies, although independent of the specialist schools programme, were required to specialise and had to take part in the community dimension. They were part of the specialist schools network and could attain specialist status in specialisms not included in the specialist schools programme, such as environmental studies or health, and could bypass the designation process. Although the requirement to specialise has since been removed, multiple academies continue to have specialist status. The academies and specialist schools programmes were sometimes jointly referred to as the specialist schools and academies programme during this period.

There were 2382 specialist schools by June 2005. This number continued to grow, reaching 2695 by February 2007. This was 84% of the total secondary schools in England and 17 local government areas now had a universal specialist school system. The programme was extended to English primary schools in a 2007 pilot, where 34 schools were designated with specialisms in music, arts, languages, science and sports.

==== Entry into Northern Ireland ====
On 16 November 2004, a conference was held to debate the efficacy and advantages of a specialist education system in Northern Ireland. The conference was well-received, with the Department of Education of Northern Ireland (DENI) agreeing to trial a specialist schools programme for four years. Every secondary was invited to apply for the programme, with the goal of ten being designated specialist from September 2006. 15 specialisms, including the ten available in England, were offered. The five new specialisms exclusive to Northern Ireland were health and social care, leisure and tourism, information and communication technology (ICT), dramatic arts and art and design. A rural and environmental studies specialism was also discussed. By November 2005, 46 schools had applied, of which 13 were reported as shortlisted by The Irish Times. The shortlisted schools only applied for six of the 15 specialisms: ICT, arts, business and enterprise, music, language and science. 12 of these schools were successfully designated in September 2006, following a speech from Angela Smith at St Louise's Comprehensive College, which was itself designated a Performing Arts College. 32 more schools were designated specialist over the following years; all of these had one of the ten English specialisms.

== Near-universal specialist system ==
=== Premiership of Gordon Brown: 2007–2010 ===
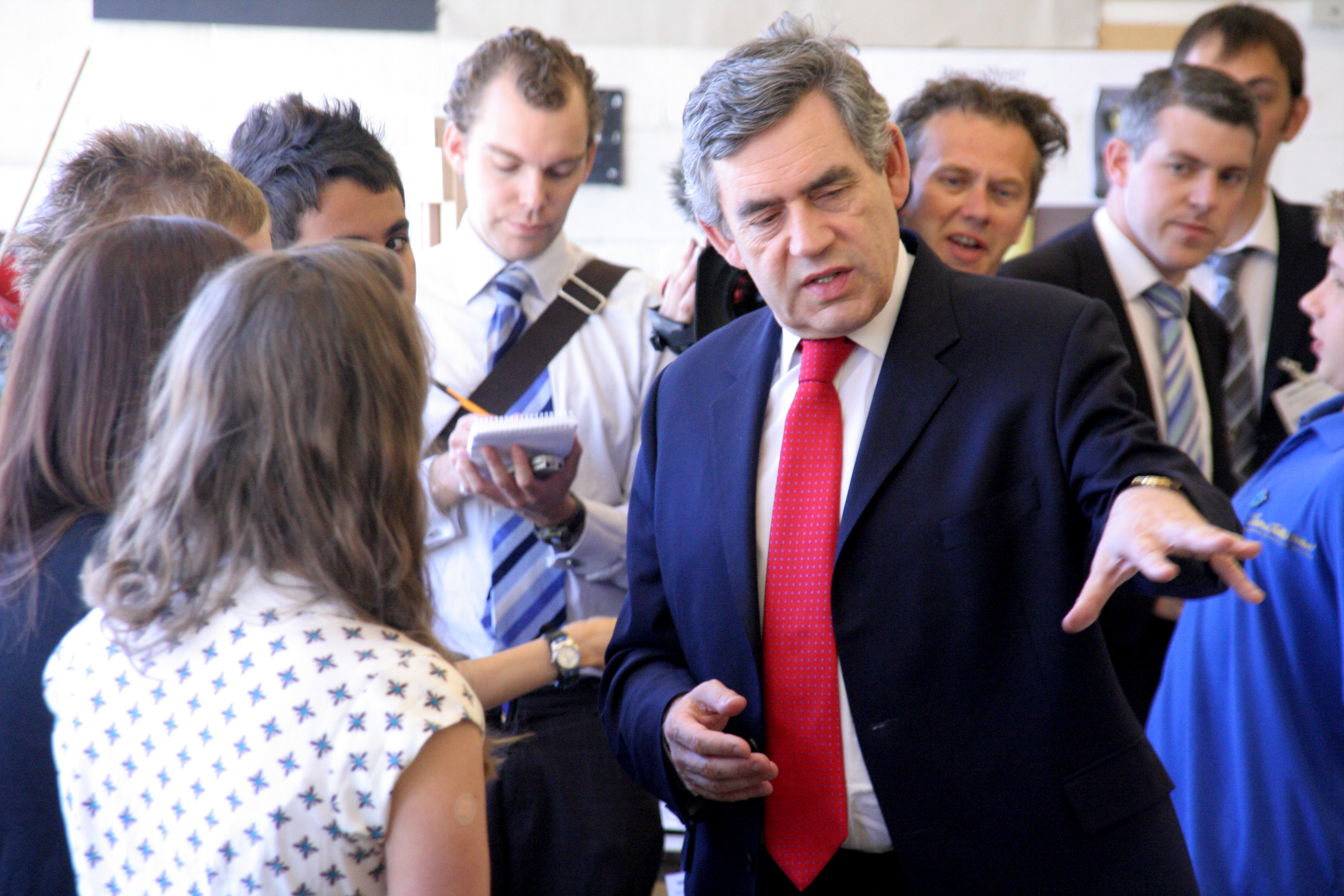
Gordon Brown at Thomas Tallis School in 2008. He presided over the near-universalisation of the specialist secondary school system

On 27 June 2007, Tony Blair officially resigned as prime minister after ten years in office, being succeeded by then-Chancellor of the Exchequer Gordon Brown. Brown had held a key role in influencing New Labour's education policy under Tony Blair and wished to continue the policy of school diversification. By this time the specialist schools programme cost £1.5 billion and was allocated a further £50 million for the next three years. The policy of having all secondary schools specialise was maintained, with 90% of state secondary schools specialising by 2008.

Brown's education secretary, Ed Balls, published the June 2009 education white paper Your child, your schools, our future: building a 21st century schools system, with its policies being enacted by the Children, Schools and Families Act 2010. In this white paper the specialist schools programme was placed at the core of the new school system in England and specialist schools were reemphasised as centres of excellence in their specialisms. By this time the English specialist system had become "near-universal", with secondary education being a "truly specialist secondary system". The white paper's policies built on this, using the system to encourage even more cooperation between schools. This cooperation would be legally enforced and was intended to give students access to good teaching. It was expected that all schools would share specialist knowledge in subjects such as language and science and teach the new 14–19 Diploma through the system. Children's Trust Boards, areas where public services and schools would merge, were also planned. Some were already established shortly before the white paper was published, with a number of schools hosting relocated specialist child health clinics, youth centres and sports facilities.

To reflect these changes, the specialist schools programme was centred around five new core principles: exported excellence, specialism excellence, school-wide specialism impact, partnership between schools and cooperation with the local community. The designation process was modified to follow these principles, with School Improvement Partners (SIPs) and local government authorities taking control of designations and re-designations from the Department for Children, Schools and Families (DCSF). The pilot for the new process took place in autumn 2009. SIPs investigated schools' performance using benchmarks and determined whether they were satisfactory for re-designation. All schools participating in the pilot were successfully re-designated. After the pilot's success, the new designation process was enacted in early 2010. By this time, there were 3068 designated specialist schools in England, or 93% of the country's state-funded secondary schools.

The Great Recession damaged the political reputation of Prime Minister Gordon Brown and it was growing increasingly unlikely that Labour would win the May 2010 general election. In response, Sir Cyril Taylor approached the Conservative Party's shadow education secretary, Michael Gove. Gove wanted to reform the education system by implementing changes that followed a "radical form of Blairism" and abandoned the party's previous policy of expanding selection in favour of academisation. Taylor and Gove attended a luncheon hosted by the Conservative Carlton Club, in which they and 15 other sponsors and supporters of the specialist schools and academies programmes conversed. Taylor made various suggestions for the programmes' continuation under a Conservative government, most of which were well-received by Gove.

=== Coalition and discontinuation: 2010–2011 ===
==== England ====
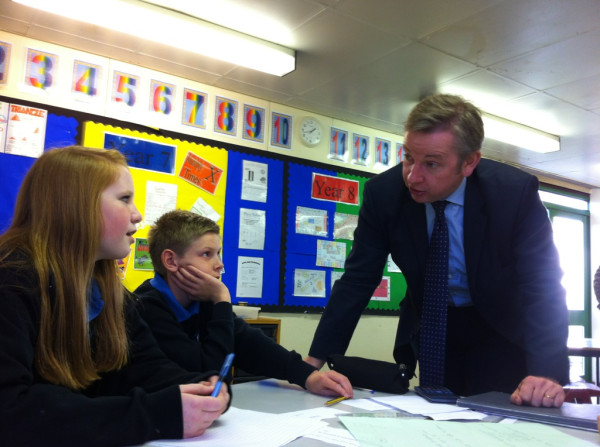
Michael Gove at Chantry High School in 2011. The school had been a specialist Humanities College since 2006.

The Labour government lost power soon after the 2010 general election and the Conservative–Liberal Democrat coalition entered government. In June 2010 Michael Gove, who was now education secretary, sent a letter to English local authorities informing them of a number of discontinued educational grants, including the £25,000 grant awarded to re-designating specialist schools and the discontinuation of high performing specialist school designation. Schools designating for the first time still received additional funding at a budget of £7 million. Further cuts would be decided in autumn's Comprehensive Spending Review.

In the run-up to the review, Labour politicians claimed to have leaked government plans to scrap Sports Colleges and their associated specialist funding in favour of academic subjects. The programme's other specialisms would be spared. Instead, when the review was released and in spite of Michael Gove's meetings with Cyril Taylor, it was announced that all of the programme's English specialist schools would have their dedicated extra funding rerouted and absorbed into the general schools budget, in a process that the government called "mainstreaming". The absorbed funds would now be sent to schools through the Dedicated Schools Grant. The requirement for English schools without academy status to designate and re-designate for specialist status would also be removed, allowing any to specialise at will but without the extra funding awarded to specialist schools previously. Consequently, government funds given to the SSAT and YST to help them support English schools through the designation process and run specialist school networks would be withdrawn, with the central specialist schools network being abolished. These changes took effect from April 2011, ending the programme and the formal process of specialist designation and re-designation in England.

According to Gove, the changes had been made to increase the freedom of opportunity that school leaders had from specialisation and its associated funding. Specialism had become "so firmly established", that the "time [had] come to remove the Government imposed prescription that [had] built up around the programme". Gove also expressed his hope that the SSAT would continue to advise him on the benefits of the programme and "how those benefits might be realised in a changed environment".

==== Northern Ireland ====
The Northern Irish variant of the programme ended in August 2011, having been scheduled to do so in an announcement by Sinn Féin education minister Caitriona Ruane in April 2009. The Northern Irish Specialist Schools' Forum Steering Group had met with government policymakers to continue the specialist school model after August 2011, planning for it to become the basis of the Northern Irish government's Every School a Good School (ESaGS) policy for school improvement. The group advocated it as an inclusive way to boost standards, share best practice and encourage student voice and proposed having specialist school clusters established across the country, with the benefits of iNet membership being capitalised on (iNet was the international arm of the SSAT). However, the DENI could not afford to continue the model due to budget restrictions and therefore decided to instead "identify ways in which the excellent practice and partnership working demonstrated within so many specialist schools can be shared more widely".

==== Legacy ====
The programme left almost every state-funded secondary school in England, 96.6% to be exact, with specialist status; only 80 remained unspecialised. This near-universal specialist system, according to Education Secretary Michael Gove and Schools Minister Nick Gibb, was why the funding was mainstreamed, alongside a government venture for more school freedom and autonomy. More types of specialist school have been introduced since the closure of the programme and specialisms introduced by the programme are still available regardless of designation. The majority of specialist schools designated in the programme, 2799 specialist schools to be exact, continue to operate – designations from the programme remain legally valid as there is no longer a requirement to re-designate. In Northern Ireland for example, the Assumption and St Louis grammar schools continue to maintain their specialist status in music and technology, having both been designated with these specialisms in September 2009.

From 2020, some free schools were opened with specialist Maths or Science College status under Education Secretary Gavin Williamson's COVID-19 recovery plan. Conservative prime minister Boris Johnson also intended to introduce more specialist schools before his resignation. It is believed that this policy may have harkened back to the specialist schools programme.

== Designation process ==
The Mathematics and Computing College logo

=== Specialisms ===
Schools could apply to be designated specialist in one of ten subject specialisms which, when granted, would turn them into one of the following specialist schools, each having their own sub-specialisms:

- Arts College – specialises in and can be a Media, Performing, or Visual Arts College, or a combination of these. Drama and digital arts sub-specialisms were available in Northern Ireland.
- Business and Enterprise College – specialises in business, enterprise, mathematics and ICT and their related subjects.
- Engineering College – specialises in science, mathematics and design and technology.
- Humanities College – specialises in English, geography or history and must also specialise in two of the following: citizenship, religious education, drama or classics.
- Language College – specialises in modern foreign languages.
- Mathematics and Computing College – specialises in mathematics and ICT or computing, can also be a Mathematics College or Computing College.
- Music College – specialises in music but has an additional focus on improving the provision of English, mathematics and ICT.
- Science College – specialises in science and mathematics.
- Sports College – specialises in physical education, sports and other physical subjects such as dance.
- Technology College – specialises in science, mathematics and design and technology.

Five more specialisms were exclusively available in Northern Ireland. Only one, information and communication technology, was actually granted. Schools designated in this subject became ICT Colleges.

Applications would usually open in March and October each year. Schools initially designating could apply for a combined specialism in two of these specialisms or one of them alongside a vocational specialism which allowed Vocational College (later Applied Learning College) status. Special schools could apply for a SEN specialism, leading to specialist SEN College status in one of the four specialist areas of the SEND Code of Practice, but could not apply for a combined specialism. Re-designating specialist schools could apply for a second specialism. Secondary vocational and SEN specialisms were offered exclusively to high performing specialist schools. From 2005, a secondary vocational specialism gave high performing specialists the right to open a new sixth form college. All schools could add a curricular rural dimension to their designation and re-designation applications. This gave specialist schools an additional curriculum based on rural education. Despite the dimension's focus on rural schools, it was also available to urban and suburban schools.

=== Requirements and sponsorship ===
To apply for specialist designation, secondary schools had to demonstrate reasonable standards of achievement, and produce a three-year development plan with quantified targets related to learning outcomes. Secondaries also had to raise £50,000 in a private sector sponsorship bid (£20,000 for secondaries with less than 500 students). Before 1999, these sponsorship bids had to be £100,000. Northern Irish secondary schools had to raise £25,000. Private sector sponsorship includes charitable trusts, internal fund raising and donations from private companies and business sponsors. In some cases donations could be made in cash from entities in the private sector such as Arcadia and HSBC, but could also be donations "in kind" of goods or services. Notable sponsors included Lord Harris of Peckham, Peter Lampl, Evelyn de Rothschild and Philip Green. Secondary schools could not apply if they were in special measures.

The total sponsorship during the scheme was of the order of £100 million. The reward for achieving specialist status was a government grant of £100,000 to go with the £50,000 in sponsorship for a capital project related to the specialism and an extra £100 to £129 per pupil per year for four years to support the development plan. This was normally targeted on additional staffing and professional development, though up to 30% may have been spent on equipment. Schools that made a good attempt at achieving their targets over the four-year development plan period normally had their grants renewed at three-year intervals with no further need to raise sponsorship. However, since 2008, the government sought to encourage long-term relationships with business partners by offering a matching grant to re-designating specialist schools that were able to raise a further £25,000 in private sponsorship.

English primary schools did not require sponsorship bids for designation, instead they were selected by their local authorities who then reported their decision to the DfE. They also could not choose their specialisms, as the pilot for their participation placed them into one of five locational clusters which dictated the specialisms available.

=== Designation: 1993–2010 ===
Between 1993 and 2010 the majority of English specialist designations and re-designations were granted by the DCSF. In Northern Ireland, they were granted by Education Authority Boards.

English secondaries had to apply to the specialist schools unit of the DCSF during one of the two bidding rounds, usually in March or October. They would then have to provide two letters, one from their local authority and one from a sponsor, supporting their application. From 2003, middle and upper schools could submit a joint application for specialist designation and re-designation. Secondaries could also jointly apply, including those of different types. For example, grammar schools were able to jointly apply with secondary modern schools. A school's application had to include its development plan and how the repeating grants would support said plan, reasons for applying for the capital grant, proof of a planned community dimension, information about sponsors and their cooperation with the school and the school's general information.

Schools were told to apply for specialisms based on the needs of their local communities, which were determined through dialogue with local authorities and other schools nearby. Under-designated specialisms were preferred by the DCSF, as were the science and mathematics and computing specialisms. The SSAT supported bids, with an exception to bids for Sports College status, which were instead supported by the YST. From September 2006, specialist re-designations occurred parallel to and were granted based on inspections by Ofsted (the government body tasked with inspecting educational institutions and keeping them in line). Re-designating specialist schools receiving the lowest Ofsted grade would lose specialist status and be given a year to improve. Failure to do so would result in the schools closing down and reopening as academy schools: schools controlled by a sponsor and funded by the government as opposed to its local authority.

=== Designation: 2010–2011 ===
From 1 April 2010, control over English specialist designations and re-designations were transferred from the DCSF to local authorities and School Improvement Partners (SIPs). A new procedure for designation was enforced as a result, with this procedure being trialled in autumn 2009.

Designation and re-designation was now granted based on meeting national benchmarks and prerequisites unique to each specialism. SIPs were directed to only accept designation and re-designation applications from schools when they met these benchmarks. Local authorities oversaw SIPs and enforced fairness and accountability in their decisions. The DfE was permitted to review these decisions, making sure that SIPs could provide sufficient reasoning, overruling them should they fail to do so.

Schools had to show that they would follow the five principles of the specialist schools programme and meet the prerequisites of their desired specialisms. They also had to show improvement in the subjects of their desired specialism in the three years prior to their application. SIPs were allowed to designate schools that refused to raise any of the required private sponsorship, however the funding that came with specialist status for these schools would be withheld by the DfE. When a SIP declined a school's application for designation, they had to provide a larger amount of evidence to the school's local authority than if they accepted. Re-designating specialist schools that failed to meet the national benchmarks were put on probation and given a year to improve. Failure to do so would result in the schools being stripped of specialist status.

== High performing specialist schools programme ==
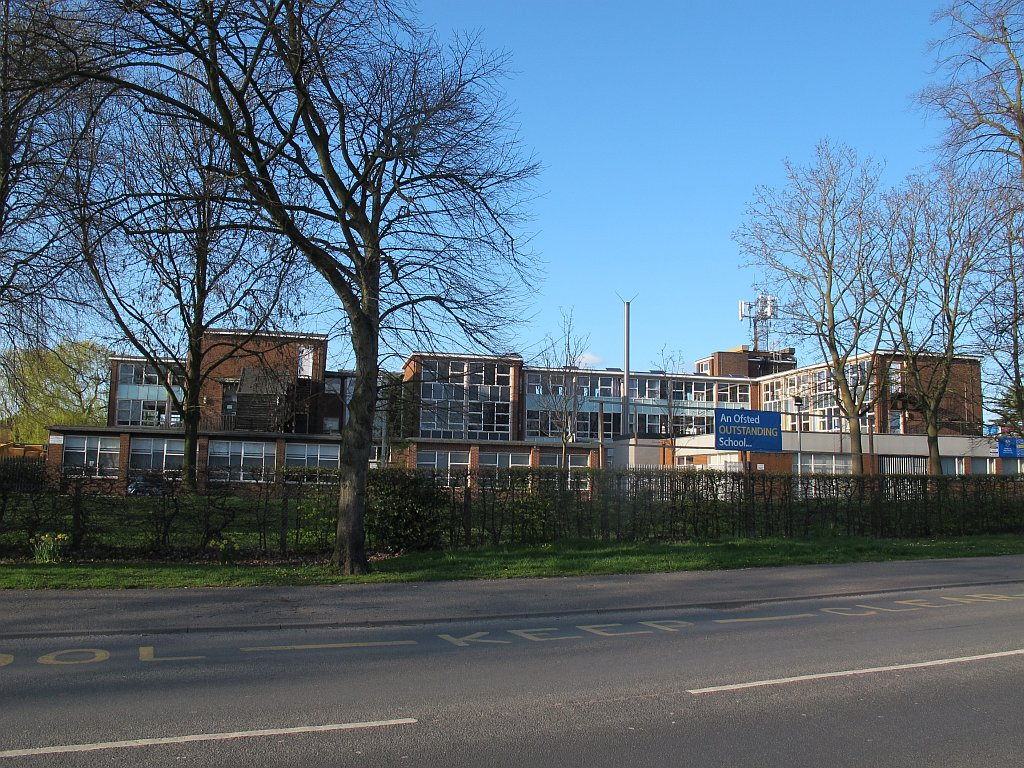
Sandbach High School chose four options: specialisms in Language and Applied Learning, training school status and Leading Edge membership

The high performing specialist schools programme (HPSS programme) was a government programme in England that invited successful specialist secondary schools participating in the specialist schools programme to re-designate as high performing specialist schools (HPSS). High performing specialist schools then had to establish a partnership with a school of their choice, gaining additional funds to do so.

Specialist schools that re-designated into high performing specialists maintained their original specialism(s) but were allowed to select one or multiple exclusive HPSS options out of five, allowing them to possibly gain another specialism, join one of three different additional programmes or become a training school. Initially there were two more HPSS options to choose from, gaining either a vocational or SEN specialism, (Note: Special schools were also allowed to gain SEN specialisms.) however these options were later granted to normal specialist schools as long as they were one half of a combined specialism (which were only available to schools initially designating).

=== Options ===
Specialist schools re-designating for high performing specialist status were allowed to choose one or multiple of the following options, granting them further funding to facilitate said option:

- Gain another specialism
- Gain a second specialism in either SEN or vocational learning
- Join the Leading Edge Partnership programme (LEPP)
- Join the Raising Achievement Transforming Learning programme (RATL programme), later the Raising Achievement Partnership programme (RAPP)
- Join the Youth Support Trust School Leadership Programme
- Become a training school

=== Programmes ===
The LEPP was established in 2003 by the Department for Education and Skills and was soon followed by the RAPP in 2004. Both programmes were established to solve problems in education. Both intended to do this by establishing partnerships between English secondary schools and, in the case of Leading Edge Partnerships, encouraging them to work to raise achievement through the sharing of proven ideas. The lead school in each Leading Edge Partnership received £60,000 per year to facilitate this. The RAPP allowed headteachers and schools to "mentor and coach" underperforming schools, loan staff and replicate achievement made in their own schools. Both programmes were merged and subsumed into the HPSS programme as the new Leading Edge programme, a subprogramme of the HPSS programme. Leading schools in this programme were invited to become consultant school accredited (CSA), thereby gaining consultant school accredited status. CSA status schools were often called consultant schools. Advanced consultant schools were CSA status schools that displayed an ability to help schools across areas of a broad variety. A Gifted and Talented subprogramme was established as part of the HPSS programme. High performing specialist schools participating in the subprogramme became lead schools, schools that specialised in Gifted and Talented education. These schools were meant to give their support to other schools.

== Evaluation ==
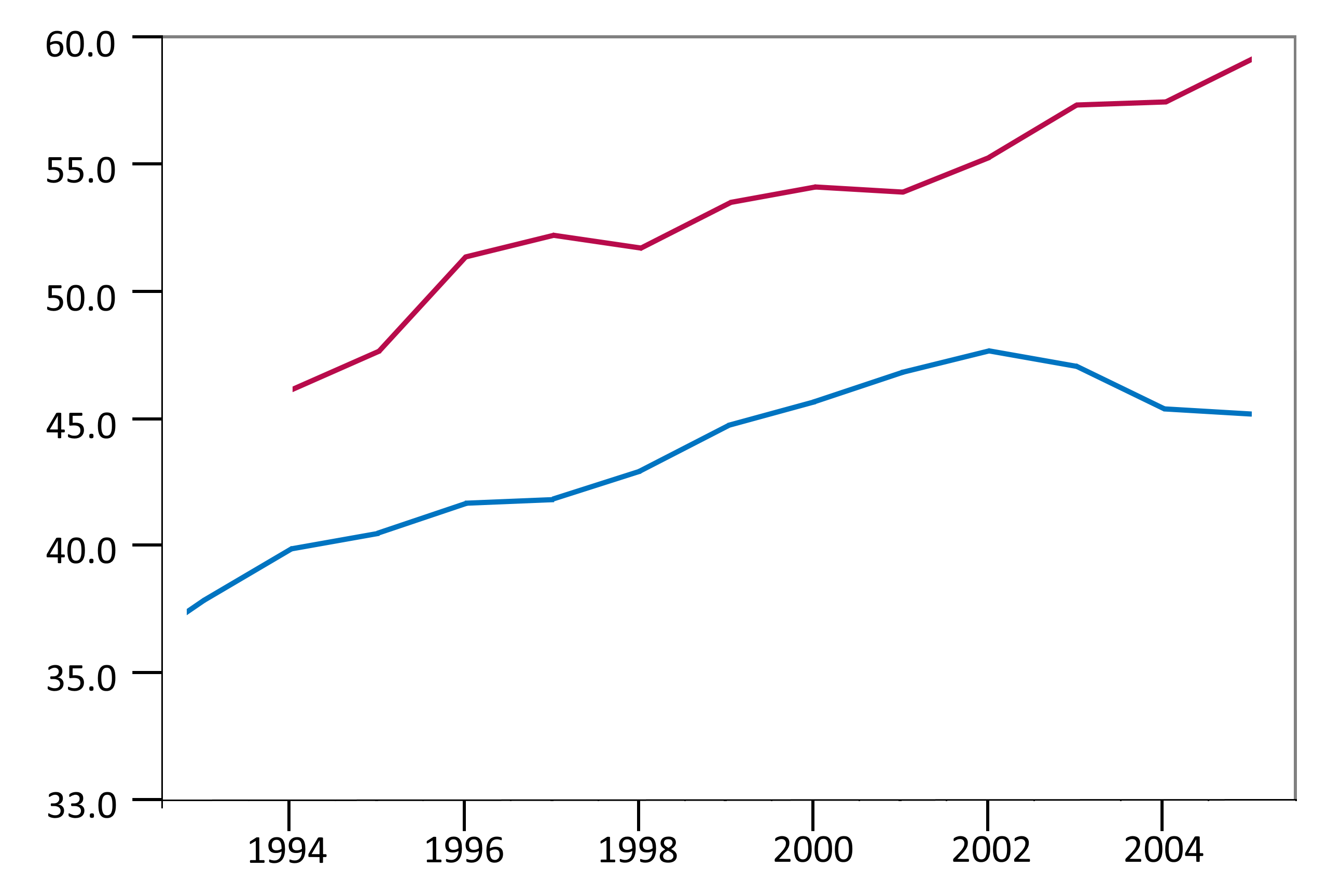
Percentage of students with five or more passes in their GCSE exams in specialist (crimson) and non-specialist schools (blue) between 1993 and 2005.

=== Systemic evaluation ===
David Jesson of the University of York published a series of annual studies of the results of the specialist schools programme, on behalf of the SSAT. These studies reported that non-selective specialist schools achieved significantly higher results at GCSE results than non-specialist comprehensive schools, that they achieved higher 'added value' when prior achievement was taken into account, and that the gains had increased with the length of time the school had been specialist. Jesson's statistical methodology was criticised, and others pointed out that early specialist schools were chosen for the programme because they were already successful. Other studies found that specialist schools performed slightly better at GCSE, particularly benefitting more able pupils and narrowing the gap between boys and girls. Subsequent studies attributed the increase to the additional funding, and reported that the effect was diminishing as a greater proportion of schools become specialist.

There was evidence that specialist schools took fewer children from poorer families than non-specialist schools. One possible cause was that it may have been easier for middle-class parents to raise the necessary sponsorship. Liberal Democrat peer Baroness Sharp of Guildford found the programme to have "a disproportionate number of middle-class schools."

The abolition of the programme led to some schools, mostly Technology Colleges, being unable to afford specialist equipment. An example is Davison High School, which cancelled an initiative for Year Nine students where they would use IPads in all of their lessons because of the programme's discontinuation. Other schools that were unable to maintain their equipment began relying on donations from parents. Similar effects were felt in Science Colleges.

=== Political evaluation ===
The expansion of the specialist schools programme is believed to have been one of many New Labour policies taken from the New Right; this ideology encouraged school competition and parental choice through introducing aspects of the free market to education. The "Old Labour" model of all-purpose comprehensive schools was replaced by diversified specialist schools that enhanced parental choice through a marketised education system. Left-wing commentators had criticised this move away from the comprehensive ideal. The programme was also an example of New Labour's promise to introduce Third Way public service reform through a combination of fairness and neoliberal marketisation.

The programmed helped continue the policy of restricting the influence of trade unions and local government in the government's education policy, in favour of political advisers and the voluntary sector. The SSAT's influence in particular often "blurred lines between state and non-state". This may have set the framework for the further restrictions introduced by the Conservative–Liberal Democrat coalition through policies such as the expansion of the academies programme and de-unionisation of teaching staff. During the Blair premiership, the programme also helped centralise the government and disestablish the authority of senior civil servants.

In 2003, the Education & Skills Select Committee, whose membership was mostly made of Labour MPs, found no evidence for the programme's success at raising standards. Liberal Democrat member Paul Holmes concluded that "It seemed to be the extra money and the management process going into that school that made the difference." The 2004–2005 Education and Skills Select Committee found that the cause of the programme's success was unclear and that its aim of boosting diversity had no evident reason for support. Conservative member Nick Gibb stated in November 2007 that instead of the specialist schools programme, "The key to improvement is a focus on tried and tested approaches to education." He also said that the programme had failed to provide "the higher standards our education system so desperately needs".

== See also ==
- SSAT (The Schools Network) § History
- Schools of Ambition programme
- Leading Edge Partnership
- Education in England
- Education in Northern Ireland
