= American Institute for Foreign Study =

American travel and insurance company

American Institute For Foreign Study (AIFS) Inc.
- Company type: Private
- Industry: Educational Services
- Founded: 1964; 62 years ago
- Founder: Sir Cyril Taylor
- Headquarters: Stamford, Connecticut, United States
- Area served: Worldwide
- Key people: Sir Cyril Julian Hebden Taylor (Chairman); William Gertz (CEO & President)
- Products: Study Abroad; Cultural Exchange; Summer Camps; Insurance
- Website: www.aifs.com

The American Institute for Foreign Study (AIFS) is an American travel and insurance company, managing a number of educational and travel programs centered on cultural exchange founded or acquired by British businessman and politician Sir Cyril Julian Hebden Taylor starting in 1964. Its operations include college study abroad, au pair placement, camp counsellors and staff, gifted education, and high school foreign exchange. AIFS maintains global offices in 15 countries and is headquartered in Stamford, Connecticut.

AIFS is a privately owned U.S. company with wholly owned subsidiaries around the world and has annual revenues in excess of $180 million.

== History ==
In 1964, Cyril Taylor and his partners left Procter & Gamble to form the American Institute For Foreign Study (AIFS). With the assistance of the late Senator Robert F. Kennedy in 1967, AIFS created the AIFS Foundation, which awards grants and scholarships to students for participation in study abroad programs and provides grants to high schools and other institutions for the purpose of international and educational travel. The AIFS Foundation is an independent, not-for-profit, 501(c)(3) tax exempt public charity and a U.S. Department of State designated sponsor of the J-1 Exchange Visitor Visa. In 1972, AIFS established Richmond, The American International University in London, a non-profit university with 1,000 full-time students from 100 countries.

Sir Cyril continued to serve as AIFS Chairman and Chancellor of Richmond, the American International University in London, until his death at age 82.
