= Richmond Theological College =

Listed building in Richmond, London, England

Richmond Theological College (also called "Richmond College") was a Methodist (Wesleyan) college located on Queen's Road in Richmond, London. The building is Grade II listed.

It was a college for training ministers and missionaries between 1843 and 1972.

In 1902 the College became a part of the University of London.

When the College was closed in 1972, the campus was transferred to The American International University in London, which remained on the site until 2022 when it moved to Chiswick.
