= SEN College =

Type of specialist school in the United Kingdom

SEN Colleges logo

SEN Colleges, also known as Special Specialism Colleges, are specialist special schools in the United Kingdom. They were introduced in 2006 as part of the specialist schools programme following a successful trial in 2004. The system enabled secondary and primary schools to specialise in certain fields.

== Specialization ==
Specialist SEN Colleges were special needs schools that successfully applied to the Specialist Schools Trust, receiving extra funding from this joint private sector and government scheme.

The first non-trial SEN Colleges were introduced in September 2006 after an announcement by Andrew Adonis in 2005 and could specialise in four areas:

- Communication and interaction
- Cognition and learning
- Behaviour, emotional and social difficulties
- Sensory and/or physical needs

The specialist schools programme has been defunct since 2011. Therefore, if a special school wishes to become a SEN College, they must become an academy or manage a Dedicated Schools Grant.
