= Specialist school =

Type of school

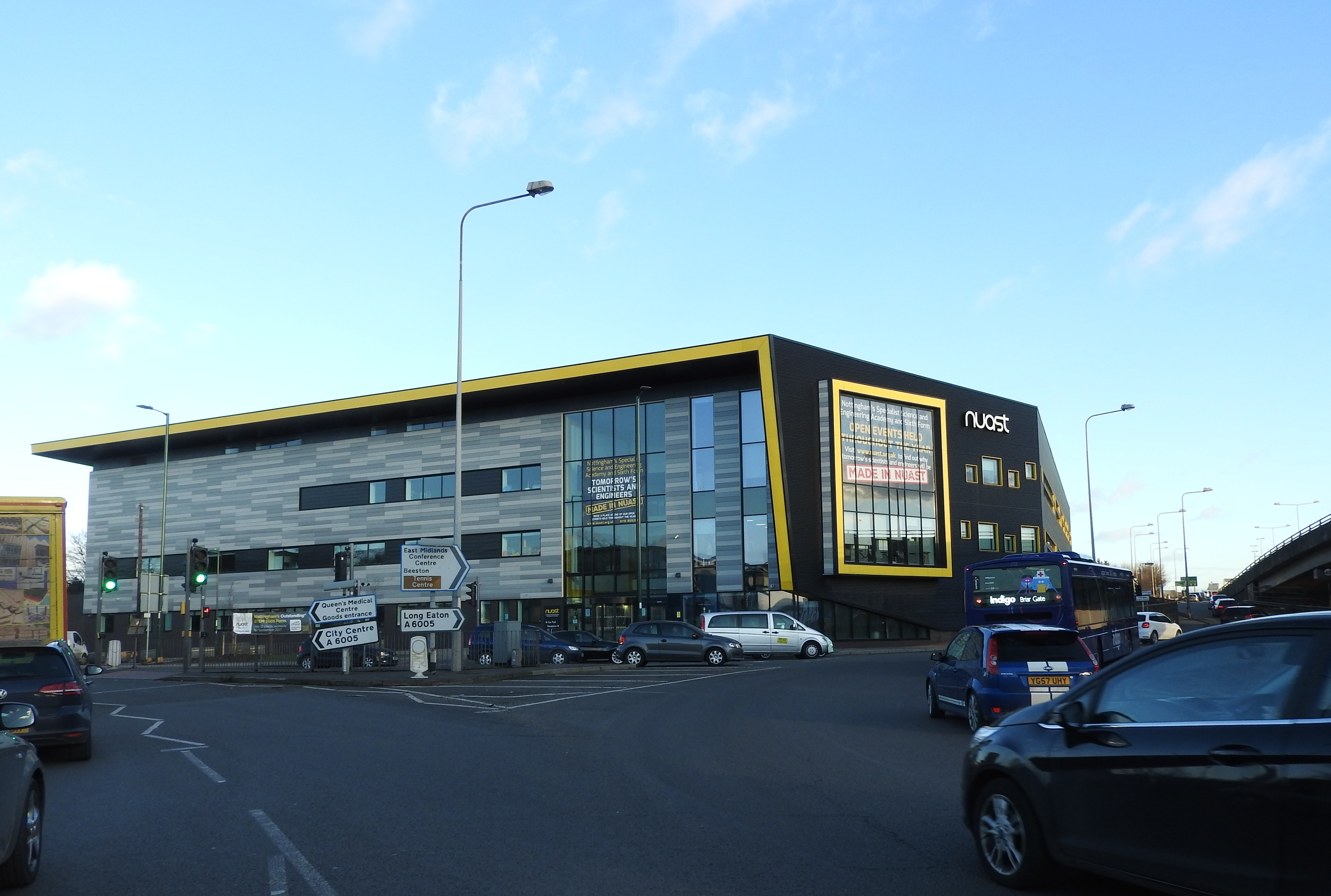
Nottingham University Academy of Science and Technology is a STEM specialist school in Nottingham, England.

Specialist schools, also known as specialised schools or specialized schools, are schools which specialise in a certain area or field of curriculum. In some countries, for example New Zealand, the term is used exclusively for schools specialising in special needs education, which are typically known as special schools. Specialist schools often have admission criteria making them selective schools as well.

== In Europe ==
Specialist schools have been recognised in Europe for a long period of time. In some countries, such as Germany and the Netherlands, education specialises when students are relatively young. In Germany, children are 10 when they are enrolled to either an academic school, which is known as a gymnasium, or a vocational school, i.e. a school offering the compulsory lower secondary education, which qualifies for subsequent vocational training. Many other countries in Europe specialise education from the age of 16.

=== Germany ===
==== Nazi Germany ====
The Nazi Regime established new specialist schools with the aim of training the future Nazi Party elite and leaders of Germany:

- National Political Institutes of Education – Run in a similar way to military academies, these were boarding schools for boys aged 10–18. They fell under the control of the Schutzstaffel (SS) from 1936.
- Adolf Hitler Schools – These were free-to-attend boarding specialist schools for leadership, serving 12–18-year olds. Students were selected for their leadership skills and Aryan likeness.
- Order Castles – These schools trained elite 25–30-year olds who were expected to become future political and military leaders.

==== Since 1945 ====
After the Second World War, Germany was separated into the capitalist West Germany and communist East Germany. In East Germany, a comprehensive system of education was established while in West Germany a specialised system was present. After German reunification in 1990, the former East Germany abandoned comprehensive education and implemented the specialised education of West Germany.

In modern Germany, education becomes specialised from the age of 10, with students attending either academic schools, i.e. university-preparatory schools, known as Gymnasien or vocational schools. Vocational schools offer only lower secondary education, a qualification needed for vocational training. However, schools known as Gesamtschulen combine the different tracks and are a third option.

Vocational specialist schools and academies offer vocational training and qualifications.

=== Netherlands ===
In the Netherlands, many specialist schools exist within the public education system. Education is specialised between vocational and academic schools from the age of 13, however there are many specialist schools in the primary sector of education, with specific types including partnership schools, Dalton schools and brede schools/community schools.

Brede schools (broad schools), also known as extended schools or community schools, combine education with important parental and children's services such as childcare and community health centres, and follow a goal of delivering effective and affectionate education while granting equal opportunities of education to adults, children and teenagers. They may also be an alliance between schools and services rather than one institution (e.g. the DE Brede School in Amsterdam is a collaboration between three separate primary schools). Brede schools do not receive additional funding on a national level, nor is there a centralised model of brede schooling, with funding and policy being decided locally. In Rotterdam for example, brede schools are integrated into the education system. In addition to primary schools, pre-schools and secondary schools can also be brede schools. There are over 1,200 brede schools. In the 1990s, the majority of brede schools were located in areas which were historically deprived, namely those with significant levels of migration.

=== United Kingdom ===
In the United Kingdom, the term specialist school refers to a school with an emphasis or specialist focus on a certain field or area of the curriculum, with these specialised areas being called specialisms. British specialist schools intend to act as centres of excellence in their specialism. Specialist schools have been present in the primary, secondary and further education sectors. There have been specialist schools in England, Scotland and Northern Ireland, but none in Wales.

==== England and Northern Ireland ====
In England, secondary specialist schools may select up to ten per cent of their yearly student intake for aptitude in their specialism provided that it includes either the performing arts, visual arts, physical education, sports or modern foreign languages. There was a near-universal specialist system of secondary education in England in 2011, with 96.6% of English state secondary schools having specialised.

Under the specialist schools programme which ran from 1993 and 2006 until 2011, (Note: September 1993 – April 2011 (England), September 2006 – August 2011 (Northern Ireland).) secondary schools pursuing specialist school status in England and Northern Ireland had to go through a designation process where they were required to pass benchmarks and demonstrate achievement in their desired specialism, while also raising between £20,000 and £50,000 in private sector sponsorship. (Note: Secondary schools in England had to raise £50,000, though schools with less than 500 students had to raise £20,000 instead, while secondary schools in Northern Ireland had to raise £25,000.) Passing the process gave designated schools specialist status in one of 10 or 15 (Note: In England, there were 10 specialisms to choose from. Two more specialisms, applied learning and SEN, were available to mainstream schools as one half of a combined specialism or as a second specialism taken in re-designation. Standalone SEN specialisms were offered exclusively to special schools. Five more specialisms were offered exclusively in Northern Ireland, however most schools were designated with one of the English specialisms; information and communications technology was the only Northern Irish specialism to be granted.) available specialisms and an optional curricular rural dimension. Two of the 10 or 15 specialisms could be combined to form one specialism. The reward for specialist status was a £100,000 government grant alongside an additional £129 in funding for every student enrolled to the school. Every three years, schools had to renew their status and re-designate. Re-designation brought with it the possibility of a second specialism and high performing specialist status; both of these would grant additional funding. Selected primary schools joined the specialist schools programme in 2007 as part of a government trial. Since 2011, secondary schools in England no longer need to designate or re-designate for specialist status and can gain specialisms beyond the 12 originally available in the specialist schools programme. Academy schools, which were specialist schools at this time, were already unrestrained in their choice of specialism. The United Kingdom's specialist schools programme has attracted other countries toward specialisation.

Any state secondary school in England, whether they are local authority-maintained or independent from their control, can become a specialist school. Unique types of specialist school include City Technology Colleges, early academy schools, University technical colleges, studio schools and maths schools.

== Outside Europe ==
=== Australia ===
Schools that operate specialist education programs exist in all Australian states and territories. These schools are typically associated with the arts or elite sports programs. In South Australia, specialist schools cover the arts, gifted and talented programs, languages, agricultural schools, science, technology, engineering and mathematics, advanced technology project schools, sports schools, and trade training centres. In Victoria, examples of specialist government schools include those focused on science and maths (e.g.John Monash Science School), performing arts (e.g. Victorian College of the Arts Secondary School), sports (e.g. Maribyrnong Secondary College), and leadership and enterprise (e.g. The Alpine School). An alternative model is those sporting organisations that deliver specialist programs to a narrow selection of schools, such as Cricket Australia's Specialist School Program to three Western Australian schools. The Victoria State Government defines specialist schools as schools which specialise in subjects and also schools which specialise in special needs teaching.

=== Canada ===
In Canada, there have been specialized schools in Calgary, Toronto and Niagara Falls. These schools, also known as niche schools and alternative schools, are usually selective, however the Toronto District School Board has recently scrapped its old admission arrangements and have made its specialized schools enrol students based on the students' interest in attending the school.

=== China ===
In the 1990s, the Chinese government addressed demands for a trained workforce by establishing selective specialist schools. The main type of specialist school is the key school. These are primary and secondary schools serving academic children. Schools can be designated with key status by meeting requirements in facility and teaching quality. Between 15 and 20 per cent of Chinese schools satisfied these criteria in 1999.

China has established Confucius colleges and classrooms across 87 countries. The Ministry of Education has also identified 3,916 middle schools and primary schools as specialist schools for youth football.

=== Japan ===
In Japan, the first specialist schools were the Senmon Gakkō (専門学校). These were officially defined during the Meiji era in the ordinance of 1879 as a tertiary institution which taught one curricular subject. However, in practice, the term defined private institutions which taught multiple subjects. Before they were allowed university status in 1918, being a Senmon Gakkō was the highest status that these institutions could achieve. An example of one of these specialist schools was Waseda University, which opened in 1882 as Tōkyō Senmon Gakkō (東京専門学校) but was given its current name after claiming university status in 1902 (the school did not receive official recognition as a university until 1920 and instead remained a private college).

In March 1903, the government increased its oversight over the Senmon Gakkō through Imperial Ordinance 61, officially called the Senmon Gakkō Rei. This ordinance required the schools to seek approval from the Ministry of Education for their name, location, teaching staff, admission quotas, academic year, fees, curriculum and regulations, and those that failed to receive approval were closed down. The schools also needed permission to hold examinations from the Ministry of Justice. The ordinance also expanded the term specialist school to include Japan's prestigious Imperial Universities and also military academies, although both of these were put in a "special category" separate from the Senmon Gakkō and given different regulations to them. Under the ordinance, many private institutions became vocational Senmon Gakkō.

In modern Japan, the Senmon Gakkō are tertiary specialist schools for vocational education with two years of study. The majority of them are private. There are also other private specialist schools in Japan called Senshūgakkō. These offer curricular subjects such as computer programming, languages and bookkeeping. There was previously a system of specialist schools for teacher training which consisted of normal schools, higher normal schools and colleges of arts and sciences. In 2002, former prime minister Yasuhiro Nakasone recommended establishing new specialist schools "to train prospective education professionals", with these schools being "separate from ordinary universities".

=== New Zealand ===
In New Zealand, a specialist school is a special school for students with high needs. Students with high needs are defined as those with "significant physical, sensory, neurological, psychiatric, behavioural or intellectual impairment". In 2010, students with high needs accounted for three per cent of the student population in New Zealand. The specialist schools can be day specialist schools or residential specialist schools. Day specialist schools teach years 1–13, with students allowed to attend until they reach the age of 21. There are currently 28 such schools across the country, although they may hold satellite classes in mainstream schools to provide their specialist services in a normal educational environment. Residential specialist schools are for high needs students with a "slow rate of learning". Places are offered only when a student has a Specialist Education Agreement or when their needs cannot be met by the schools in their local area.

=== South Africa ===
In South Africa, a specialist school is an ordinary school with a focus on teaching an offered particular specialised field of curriculum. There are established agricultural schools, commercial schools, trade schools, technical schools, secondary art schools and, since 2018, sports academies. Minister of Basic Education Angie Motshekga has led an initiative to introduce specialist schools since 2015, when schools of specialisation were opened in Gauteng. These schools have an English-medium education and are located near townships. Specialist schools for mathematics and science have also opened to improve South Africa's educational standard in these subjects.

=== Singapore ===
Since 1987, the Government of Singapore's education policy has been based on diversifying curricular provision between its schools. There are four government designated specialist schools offering a specialist education in chosen areas of the curriculum. These fee-paying schools, officially named specialised independent schools, specialise in either applied learning, mathematics, science, sport or art. There are also four other independent specialised schools with a specialist vocational curriculum. These are known as specialised schools. In 2011 over half of the public schools in Singapore were niche schools. These schools are specialist schools for extracurricular and unconventional subjects such as fencing, music, the performing arts and uniformed grouping. Specialist curricular areas are known as niche areas, niche domains or simply a niche, and niche schools are entitled to select up to five per cent of their intake in these areas. In 2013, the Ministry of Education set a goal for every Singaporean school to have a niche by 2017. Schools are awarded niche status after demonstrating achievement in their desired niche and are rewarded with extra funding from the Ministry. Primary niche schools are called school-based excellence schools.

=== United States ===
There is a successful small tradition of specialized schools for particular curricular areas in the United States. Specialized schools for a variety of subjects such as the performing arts or science exist in some cities, with specialized vocational and technical schools being the most typical. Most of these schools are highly selective, and are often referred to as exam schools. The term specialized school is also used to refer to boarding schools for children with special needs, as boarding provision is a small part of their educational provision.

A large number of charter schools in the United States are specialized schools. In 2015, a study evaluated the diversity between charter schools in 17 cities. The ratio between specialized charter schools and non-specialized charter schools in these cities was found to typically be around 50/50. 55 per cent of enrolled students attended non-specialized charter schools while 45 per cent attended specialized charter schools. There are also two other main types of specialized school in the United States, the magnet school and alternative school. Magnet schools are public schools which specialise in a particular course or curriculum. There were 3,497 of these schools in the United States during the 2019/2020 academic year. Alternative schools are educational establishments with untraditional methods and curriculae, including a specialised curriculum. There were 10,900 alternative schools in the United States in the 2000/2001 academic year.

== See also ==
- Specialized schools in the Soviet Union
- Junior college
