= 2000 London Labour Party mayoral selection =

London Labour Party mayoral selection 2000
- 20 February 2000
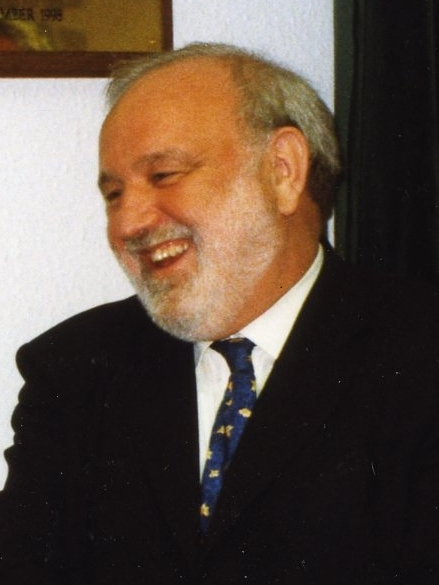

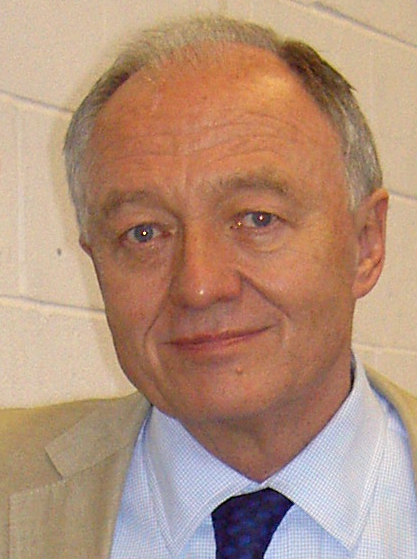

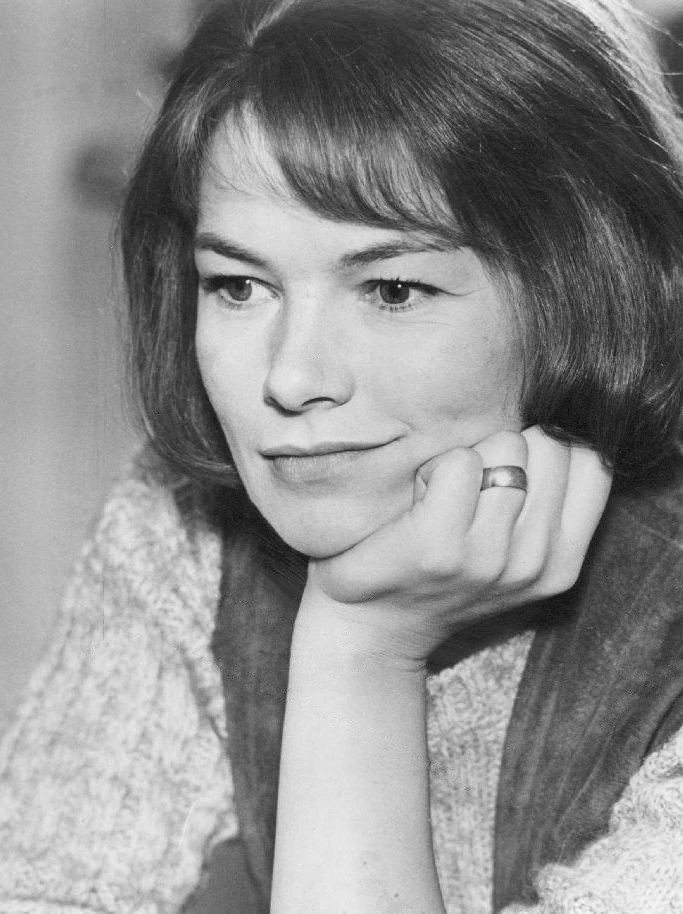
Candidate	Frank Dobson	Ken Livingstone	Glenda Jackson
First Round	49.6%	46.0%	4.4%
Second Round	51.5%	48.5%	Eliminated
Elected Mayoral candidate
Frank Dobson
Labour

The London Labour Party mayoral selection of 2000 was the process by which the Labour Party selected its candidate for Mayor of London, to stand in the 2000 mayoral election. Frank Dobson, MP for Holborn and St Pancras, was selected to stand, defeating former Leader of the Greater London Council Ken Livingstone and Glenda Jackson, MP for Hampstead and Highgate.

Livingstone went on to run as an independent candidate in the Mayoral election, defeating Dobson, who came third behind Conservative candidate Steven Norris.

== Selection process ==
The Labour candidate was selected via an Electoral College of Labour Party MPs, MEPs, GLA candidates, members and affiliated unions. Individual London Labour members were invited to vote via a postal ballot. Affiliated unions were not obliged to ballot members; instead some cast block votes (plumped for one candidate).

== Candidates ==
- Frank Dobson, Member of Parliament for Holborn and St Pancras since 1979; Secretary of State for Health, 1997–1999.
- Ken Livingstone, Member of Parliament for Brent East since 1987; Leader of the Greater London Council, 1981–1986.
- Glenda Jackson, Member of Parliament for Hampstead and Highgate since 1992.

== Result ==
Livingstone won amongst party members (60% to Dobson's 40%) and among affiliated unions (72% to Dobson's 28%, a more than 2:1 vote). Dobson's landslide victory (173:27 in ratio) amongst the systemic third of votes attributed to MPs, MEPS and GLA candidates saw him win narrowly overall: forming a simple electoral college outcome of 52% to 48%.

First round
Candidate	Elected members (33.3%)	Individual members (33.3%)	Affiliated supporters (33.3%)	Total
Frank Dobson	86.5%	35.3%	26.9%	49.6%
Ken Livingstone	12.2%	54.9%	71.0%	46.0%
Glenda Jackson	1.4%	9.8%	2.1%	4.4%

Second round
Candidate	Elected members (33.3%)	Individual members (33.3%)	Affiliated supporters (33.3%)	Total
Frank Dobson ✓	86.5%	40.1%	28.0%	51.5%
Ken Livingstone	13.5%	59.9%	72.0%	48.5%

== Aftermath ==
Livingstone described the result as "tainted" because the election system gave greater weight to the votes of London Labour MPs, MEPs, and GLA candidates, rather than rank-and-file party members, and decided to contest the election as an Independent. On handing in nomination papers, he was automatically expelled from the Labour Party. Livingstone won the election as an Independent, with Dobson coming third (winning 13% of the popular vote).

== See also ==
- 2000 London mayoral election
