= Public Finance (magazine) =

- Editor: Jon Watkins
- Former editors: Lem Bingley, Douglas Broom, Victor Smart, Mike Thatcher, Philip Windsor
- Categories: Magazine
- Frequency: Bimonthly
- Publisher: Redactive Media Group
- Total circulation: 13,277 (2020-21)
- First issue: 1896
- Country: United Kingdom

Public Finance comprises a bimonthly magazine, a UK news website and an international news website covering public policy and public sector finance.

== History and profile ==
Public Finance was first published in 1896 under the name Financial Circular. In 1935 the publication was renamed to Local Government Finance, and in 1974 it became Public Finance and Accountancy. Philip Windsor was appointed as the first professional journalist editor in 1978.

The magazine's title was shortened to Public Finance in 1994. The current editor is Jon Watkins. Publicfinance.co.uk was launched in the late 1990s, and Publicfinanceinternational.org was launched in March 2012.

It is published by Redactive Media Group on behalf of the Chartered Institute of Public Finance & Accountancy, the only professional accountancy body in both the UK and globally to specialise in public services.

From July 2022 to June 2021 Public Finance magazine had a circulation of 13,277 copies according to the Audit Bureau of Circulation.
