= Richmond American University London =

University in London, England

Coordinates: 51.4523°N 0.2966°W

- Coat of arms
- Motto: Unity in Diversity
- Type: Private university
- Established: 1972
- Affiliations: Independent Universities Group; Association of American International Colleges and Universities
- Endowment: £8.4 million (2018)
- Budget: £25 million (2017)
- Chairman: William Durden
- President: Phil Deans
- Faculty: 83 (2017)
- Students: 1,600 (2016)
- Location: London, England
- Campus: Chiswick Business Park, London Borough of Hounslow; Leeds, Yorkshire
- Website: richmond.ac.uk
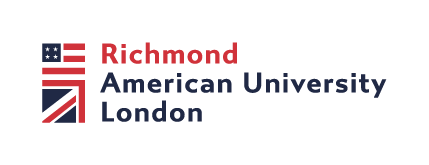

Richmond American University London is a private university in London, United Kingdom. Richmond was founded in 1972, by British educator Cyril Taylor.

The university awards US degrees from the American state of Delaware, where Richmond is accredited by the Middle States Commission on Higher Education. Until 2018, Richmond's UK degrees were awarded by the Open University; but from the 2018/2019 academic year, Richmond has been able to grant its own UK degrees, after having received Taught Degree Awarding Powers from the Quality Assurance Agency for Higher Education. This means that all students at Richmond gain both a UK and US degree studying one programme.

Despite its title, the university no longer has a campus in the London Borough of Richmond upon Thames. Its academic campus is now at Chiswick Business Park, in the London Borough of Hounslow, and its sports campus in Leeds in Yorkshire.

== History ==
Richmond was founded in 1972 by the social entrepreneur and politician Cyril Taylor, chairman of the American Institute For Foreign Study (AIFS), as Richmond College, The American College in London. It began teaching on the site of the former Richmond Theological College, part of the University of London, founded in 1843 as a Methodist theological college. AIFS had been previously using the college site for a number of years for their London study abroad programmes. AIFS purchased half of the college's 10-acre site for £300,000 (equivalent to £3.82 million in 2015), including the majority of its buildings and front lawns, to form a new American liberal arts college. A second campus was opened on St Albans Grove and Ansdell Street in Kensington in 1978 for third and fourth year students as well as the college's US study abroad programme.

In its early years Richmond served mainly to house study abroad programmes for US students. However, this changed in 1981 when Richmond obtained a licence to award US undergraduate degrees from the Washington DC Board of Education and formal accreditation from the Middle States Association of Schools and Colleges (now the Middle States Commission on Higher Education).

An expansion of the university's Kensington campus on Young Street was officially opened in March 1988 by Diana, Princess of Wales.

In 1995 AIFS spun-off the university as a non-profit educational institution. Richmond inaugurated its first postgraduate degree in 1998 with a Master of Business Administration (MBA) degree.

From 1996 to 2018 Richmond issued British degrees validated by the Open University. In May 2018, the university was granted Taught Degree Awarding Powers in the UK, enabling students to receive two degree certificates, from the US and UK.

In December 2019 the university president, Lawrence Abeln, resigned after filing a complaint with the Charity Commission against the Cyril Taylor Charitable Foundation, the main financial backers of the university. In January 2020 financial problems caused by the dispute with the foundation led the board of trustees to suspend recruitment of students for the spring term.

In March 2020 the university signed a partnership agreement with the Hong Kong-based China Education Group (CEG), giving Richmond students access to internships and exchange programmes across CEG's universities and institutes in China and Australia as well as expanding Richmond's international marketing and recruitment. The partners said the deal would "secure the long-term future of the university".

By late 2021 the university had vacated most of its buildings in the Kensington area, retaining one site on Kensington High Street. It also announced in November 2021 that it would be relocating its Richmond campus to new premises in Chiswick Business Park in summer 2022. The new Chiswick campus opened in September 2022. The Richmond site was subsequently sold to Thomas's London Day Schools. In spring 2023, the Kensington High Street location closed for student courses.

== Organisation ==
=== Governance ===
The board of trustees is responsible for the stewardship of the university's assets, strategic decision-making and ensuring compliance with its objectives.

The current chair of the board of trustees is William Durden.

The current president of Richmond, since December 2019, is Phil Deans.

Richmond had an average of 163 staff, including 83 academic staff, 68 management and administrative staff and 12 technical staff, during the year ending 30 June 2017.

In the financial year ending 30 June 2017, Richmond (including the UK charity the Richmond Foundation, which is controlled by the university) had a total income of £35.7 million (including a one-off donation of £10 million from Cyril Taylor) and total expenditure of £25.2 million

== Academic profile ==
=== Schools and departments ===
Richmond is composed of six schools and departments:

- Department of communications and the arts
- Department of science, innovation and technology
- Department of social sciences and humanities
- Richmond Business School
- Richmond International Academic and Soccer Academy (in Leeds)
- School of applied liberal arts

=== Curriculum ===
Richmond offers a range of four-year undergraduate programmes at bachelor's degree level across a broad range of subjects, along with associated optional 'minors' that can be taken alongside the main degree programme. All students also take nine 'liberal arts' courses from a selection of 16 during their first three years.

Standard degrees are four-years long, following the US system with the first year of study at the same level as A levels. Transfer credits from US AP classes, UK A and AS Levels, the International Baccalaureate and other similar qualifications can be applied against this year, subject to grades achieved and the fit between the courses taken and the Richmond programme to be followed, potentially allowing students to complete the course in three years.

Richmond offers a range of one-year to 18-month taught postgraduate degrees including MBAs and other business subjects.

=== Accreditation ===
Richmond is a "recognised body" that can award UK degrees, subject to regular inspection by the Quality Assurance Agency for Higher Education (QAA) and regulation by the Office for Students. The last QAA inspection was in May 2016, which led to the award of taught degree awarding powers (following Richmond's addressing of concerns raised in the report) for a six-year period from 17 May 2018 to 16 May 2024, since extended to 15 May 2026. Prior to this, Richmond's UK degrees were validated by the Open University.

Richmond is accredited by the Middle States Commission on Higher Education, an accrediting body recognized by the United States Department of Education. It holds US degree awarding powers from the state of Delaware.

== Campuses ==
The Chiswick Park campus opened in September 2022 on Chiswick Business Park. It houses the university's undergraduate and postgraduate programmes. Prior to this, the university was based on the campus of the former Richmond Theological College, University of London, with a postgraduate campus on Kensington High Street.

=== Other facilities ===
In addition to its London campuses Richmond also maintains a specialist study centre, Richmond International Academic and Soccer Academy (RIASA), in Leeds, Yorkshire. Located on the campus of Leeds Beckett University, RIASA focuses on a combination of soccer training and sports management.

== Student life ==
=== Student government ===
The Student Government Association (SGA) is the student-run representative organisation for students at Richmond. In addition to representing the student body to the university regarding their academic experience, student experience and social opportunities, the SGA also organises activities for students.

=== Clubs and societies ===
Richmond's Student Affairs Department offer a small number of clubs and societies for students to get involved in. There is also a business incubator, MATRIX, run by Richmond Business School, and the Richmond Leadership Academy, which promotes the development of well-rounded graduates through a series of awards.

== Notable alumni ==
- Benjamin Hall, journalist
- Bill Paxton, Hollywood actor and director
- Bobby Chinn, celebrity chef
- Nazia Hassan, singer-songwriter
- Prince Louis of Luxembourg, son of Henri, Grand Duke of Luxembourg
- Tessy Antony de Nassau, Luxembourgish businesswoman
- Russ Carnahan, former member of the U.S. House of Representatives
- Joe Sumner, singer-songwriter and son of Sting
- Ajeenkya Patil, economist and chairman of the DY Patil Group
- Suzan Sabancı, chairwoman of Akbank
- Andrew Neeme, professional poker player
- Rosario, Princess of Preslav, Spanish art director
