= Comprehensive school (England and Wales) =

Term for a non-selective secondary school in England and Wales

A comprehensive school, or simply a comprehensive, typically describes a secondary school for pupils aged approximately 11–16 or 11–18, that does not select its intake on the basis of academic achievement or aptitude, in contrast to a selective school system where admission is restricted on the basis of selection criteria, usually academic performance. In England and Wales comprehensive schools were introduced as state schools on an experimental basis in the 1940s and became more widespread from 1965. They may be part of a local education authority or be a self governing academy or part of a multi-academy trust.

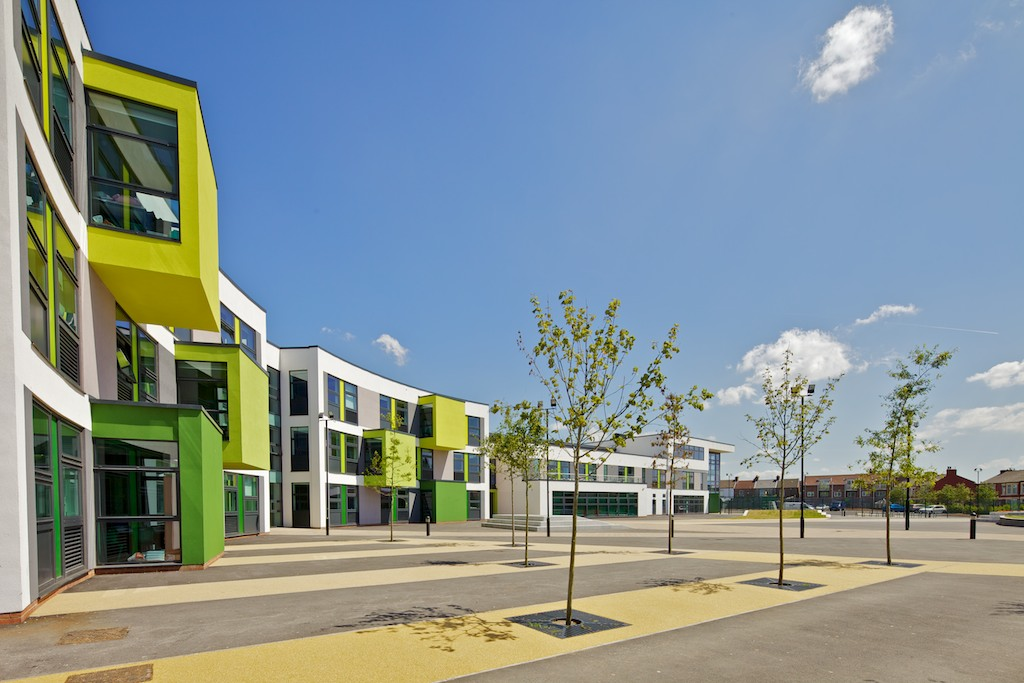
Alsop High School is a co-educational comprehensive school and sixth-form with academy status in Liverpool.

About 90% of English secondary school pupils attend a comprehensive school (academy schools, community schools, faith schools, foundation schools, free schools, studio schools, sixth form colleges, further education colleges, university technical colleges, state boarding schools, City Technology Colleges, etc). Specialist schools may also select up to 10% of their intake for aptitude in their specialism. A school may have a few specialisms, like arts (media, performing arts, visual arts), business and enterprise, engineering, humanities, languages, mathematics, computing, music, science, sports, and technology. They are not permitted to select on academic ability generally.

There were over 24,323 schools in England in 2018. There were 391 nurseries, 16,769 primary schools, 3,448 secondary schools, 2,319 independent (private) schools, 1,044 special schools and 352 pupil referral units (PRUs). In Wales there were 1,569 schools. There were 9 nursery schools, 1,238 primary schools, 19 middle schools, 187 secondary schools, 75 independent schools and 41 special schools. Comprehensive schools correspond broadly to the public school in the United States, Canada and Australia.

== Definition ==
The term "comprehensive" emerged in the early 1940s describing a "multi-lateral" or "multi-bias" ie non-selective school which served pupils of secondary school age. The term developed over the next 35 years as the concept of comprehensive schooling itself changed after a series of initiatives were held by local education authorities through this period.

In the early 1950s, comprehensive schools could be defined as schools which served all the secondary school pupils of a certain area, regardless of their ability or aptitude, with the curricular provision of a grammar school, secondary modern school and secondary technical school combined. By the early 1960s, they were defined as not just admitting pupils without selecting them, but also catering to all of their aptitudes and abilities unless they had special needs, facilitating new interests and offering combined courses on an individual basis. Therefore, a school could only justifiably call itself comprehensive if it had enough pupils from all ability levels to cater to. By the early 1970s, comprehensive schools were also defined as having the goal of giving poor children the same educational opportunities as rich children.

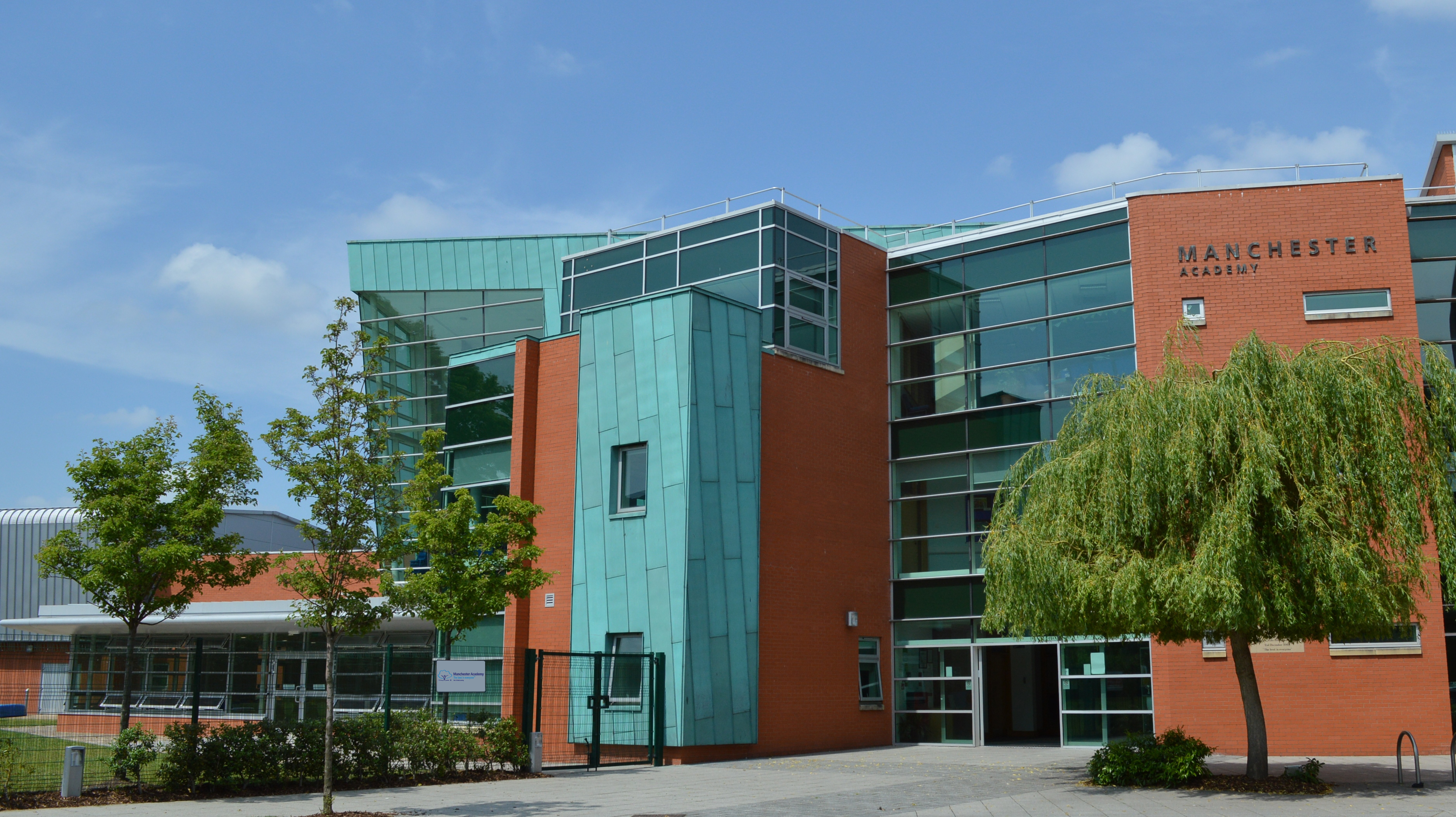
Manchester Academy is a coeducational comprehensive school with academy status in Greater Manchester.

In the present day, a comprehensive school can be defined as a state-funded secondary school which does not select its pupils on the basis of academic achievement or aptitude. Any pupil can attend, irrespective of their social class or ability, and they are all taught together. They usually serve pupils from the age of 11 to the ages of 16 or 18, though there have been comprehensive middle schools and upper schools for other age ranges in some areas. As the term is usually used in a secondary education context, a non-selective primary school cannot be considered comprehensive, though the term has been used for all-through schools that provide primary education with secondary education.

Comprehensive schools traditionally were managed by their local education authority, but now also includes academies and free schools in England, which are funded directly by the government. In England, some comprehensive schools may select pupils who live outside of their catchment area. This happens when there are not enough places in the school to accommodate pupils from outside the area who want to apply, so these pupils are examined on ability to determine who is granted a place. These schools are called partially selective schools.

== Context ==
Comprehensive schools provide an entitlement curriculum to all children, without selection whether due to financial considerations or attainment. A consequence of that is a wider ranging curriculum, including practical subjects such as design and technology and vocational learning, which were less common or non-existent in grammar schools. Providing post-16 education cost-effectively becomes more challenging for smaller comprehensive schools, because of the number of courses needed to cover a broader curriculum with comparatively fewer students. This is why schools have tended to get larger and also why many local authorities have organised secondary education into 11–16 schools, with the post-16 provision provided by sixth form colleges and further education colleges. Comprehensive schools do not select their intake on the basis of academic achievement or aptitude. In addition, government initiatives such as the City Technology Colleges and specialist schools programmes have expanded the comprehensive model. City Technology Colleges are independent schools in urban areas that are free to go to. They're funded by central government with company contributions and emphasise teaching science and technology.

English secondary schools are mostly comprehensive (i.e. no entry exam), although the intake of comprehensive schools can vary widely, especially in urban areas with several local schools. Nearly 90% of state-funded secondary schools are specialist schools, receiving extra funding to develop one or more subjects (performing arts, business, humanities, art and design, languages, science, mathematics, technology, engineering, sports, etc) in which the school specialises, which can select up to 10% of their intake for aptitude in the specialism. In these schools children could be selected on the basis of curriculum aptitude related to the school's specialism even though the schools do take quotas from each quartile of the attainment range to ensure they were not selective by attainment. In the selective school system, which survives in several parts of the United Kingdom, admission is dependent on selection criteria, most commonly a cognitive test or tests. Most comprehensives are secondary schools for children between the ages of 11 and 16, but in a few areas there are comprehensive middle schools, and in some places the secondary level is divided into two, for students aged 11 to 14 and those aged 14 to 18, roughly corresponding to the US middle school (or junior high school) and high school, respectively. With the advent of Key Stages in the National Curriculum some local authorities reverted from the Middle School system to 11–16 and 11–18 schools so that the transition between schools corresponds to the end of one Key Stage and the start of another. In principle, comprehensive schools were conceived as "neighbourhood" schools for all students in a specified catchment area.

Voluntary aided schools are linked to a variety of organisations. They can be faith schools (about two thirds are Church of England-affiliated; Roman Catholic Church, which are just under one third; or another faith), or non-denominational schools, such as those linked to London livery companies. The charitable foundation contributes towards the capital costs of the school, and appoints a majority of the school governors. The governing body employs the staff and has primary responsibility for admissions. Voluntary controlled schools, which are almost always faith schools, with the lands and buildings often owned by a charitable foundation. The local authority employs the schools' staff and has primary responsibility for admissions.

Maths free schools like Exeter Mathematics School are for 16 to 19 year pupils. As set out in the government's Industrial Strategy, maths schools help to encourage science, technology, engineering and maths (STEM) skills.

University technical colleges (UTCs), established in 2010 by the Conservative-Liberal Democrat coalition, are a type of secondary school in England that are led by a sponsor university and have close ties to local business and industry. They are funded by the taxpayer, and are non-selective, free to attend and not controlled by a local authority. The university and industry partners support the curriculum development of the UTC, provide professional development opportunities for teachers, and guide suitably qualified students to industrial apprenticeships, foundation degrees or full degrees. The sponsor university appoints the majority of the UTC's governors and key members of staff. Pupils transfer to a UTC at the age of 14, part-way through their secondary education. The distinctive element of UTCs is that they offer technically oriented courses of study, combining National Curriculum requirements with technical and vocational elements. Pupils study academic subjects as well as practical subjects leading to technical qualifications. UTCs must specialise in subjects that require technical and modern equipment, but they also all teach business skills and the use of information and communications technology. UTCs are also supposed to offer clear routes into higher education or further learning in work.

All state-funded schools are monitored and inspected by the Office for Standards in Education. Ofsted's role is to make sure that organisations providing education, training and childcare services in England do so to a high standard for children and students. They are responsible for inspection and regulation of educational institutions including independent schools, state schools, academies and childcare facilities. Ofsted publish reports on the quality of education and management at a particular school on a regular basis. His Majesty's Inspectors (HMI) rank schools based on information gathered in inspections which they undertake. Inspection reports for schools are published and are an important measure of their performance.

Every school must publish specific information on its website, including values and ethos, admission arrangements, details of the curriculum, links to Ofsted reports, behaviour policy, performance data, attainment and progress measures, policies for children with special educational needs and disabilities. careers programme, and pupil premium. School governing bodies and local authorities cannot charge for education provided during school hours (including the supply of any materials, books, instruments or other equipment). These are provided by schools. Academies (including free schools, studio schools and university technical colleges) are required through their funding agreements to comply with the law on charging for school activities.

Technical and vocational education in comprehensive schools are introduced during the secondary school years and goes on until further and higher education. Secondary vocational education is also known as further education. Further education incorporates vocational oriented education as well as a combination of general secondary education. Students can also go on to a further education college and sixth form college to prepare themselves for a wide curriculum of study, apprenticeships and vocational awards, including Business and Technology Education Council (BTEC), National Vocational Qualifications (NVQs), and Technical Levels (T-levels).

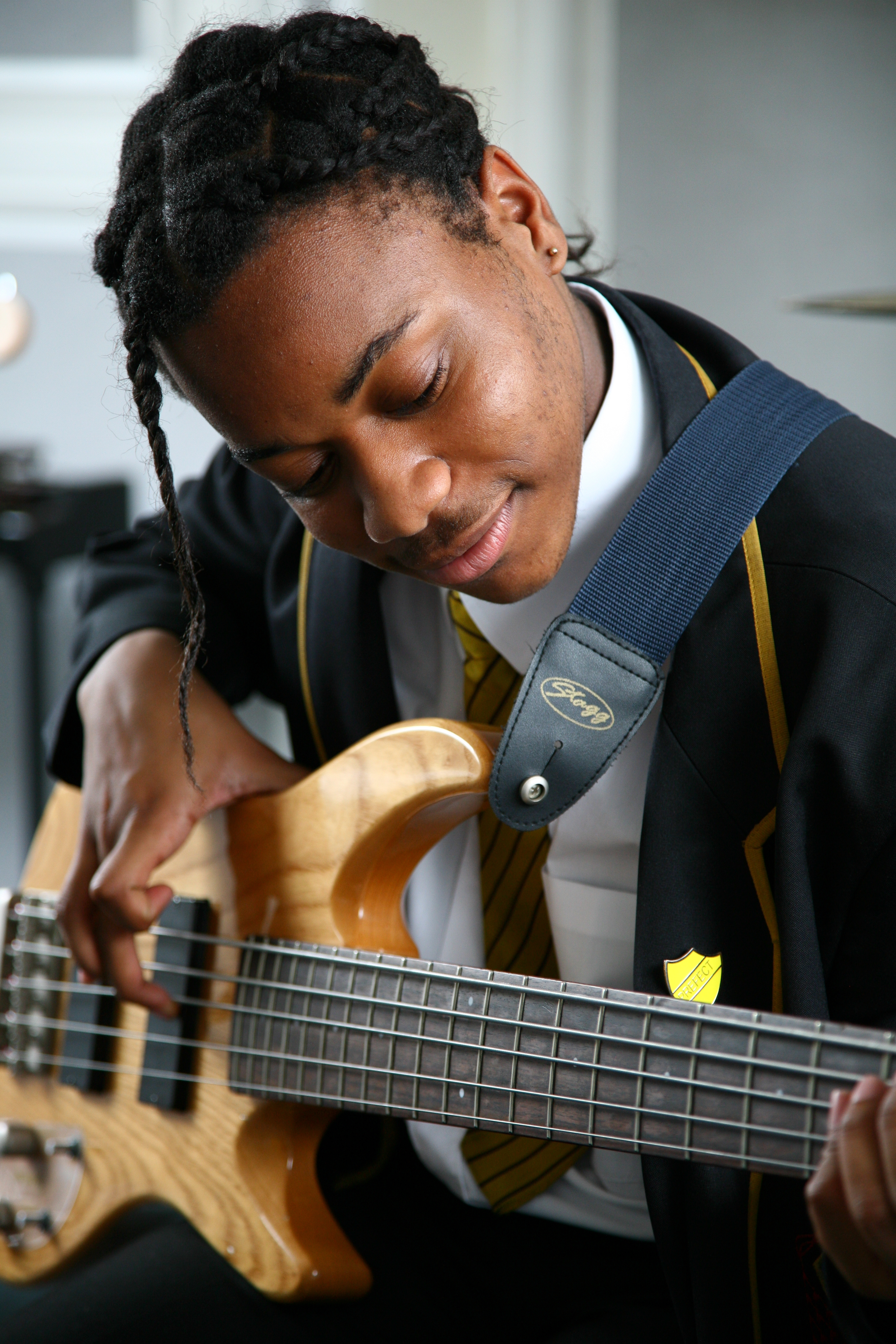
A student of St. Bonaventure's School during music lessons

=== Curriculum ===
All maintained schools in England are required to follow the National Curriculum, which is made up of twelve subjects. Every state school must offer a curriculum which is balanced and broadly based and which promotes the spiritual, moral, cultural, mental and physical development of pupils at the school and of society, and prepares pupils at the school for the opportunities, responsibilities and experiences of later life. For each of the statutory curriculum subjects, the Secretary of State for Education is required to set out a Programme of Study which outlines the content and matters which must be taught in those subjects at the relevant Key Stages. Teachers should set high expectations for every pupil. They should plan stretching work for pupils whose attainment is significantly above the expected standard. Teachers should use appropriate assessment to set targets which are deliberately ambitious.

Under the National Curriculum, all pupils undergo National Curriculum assessments at the end of Key Stage 2 in Year 6 in the core subjects English, Mathematics and Science. Individual teacher assessment is used for foundation subjects, such as art and design, geography, history, design and technology, and computing. Pupils take GCSE exams at Key Stage 4 in Year 11, but may also choose to work towards the attainment of alternative qualifications, such as the NVQs and Business and Technology Education Council. Pupils take GCSEs examinations in the core English literature, English language, mathematics, science, and entitlement subjects from the arts, humanities, design and technology, and languages. The core subjects English, Mathematics and Science are compulsory for all pupils aged 5 to 16. A range of other subjects, known as foundation subjects, are compulsory in each Key Stage:

- Art and design
- Citizenship
- Design and technology
- Geography
- History
- Computing
- Foreign languages
- Music
- Physical education

In addition to the compulsory subjects, pupils at Key Stage 4 have a statutory entitlement to be able to study at least one subject from the arts (comprising art and design, music, photography, dance, media studies, film studies, drama and media arts), design and technology (comprising design and technology, electronics, engineering, food preparation and nutrition), the humanities (comprising geography and history), and modern foreign languages. Key Stage 4 consists of over 25 broad optional subjects, including computer science, business studies, economics, astronomy, classical civilisation, geology, psychology, sociology, and ancient languages.

The Department for Education has drawn up a list of preferred subjects known as the English Baccalaureate on the results in eight GCSEs including English, mathematics, the sciences (physics, chemistry, biology, computer science), history, geography, and an ancient or modern foreign language.

All schools are required to make provision for a daily act of collective worship and must teach religious education to pupils at every key stage and sex and relationships education to pupils in secondary education. Parents can withdraw their children for all or part of the lessons. Local councils are responsible for deciding the RE syllabus, but faith schools and academies can set their own. All schools should make provision for personal, social, health and economic education (PSHE). Schools are also free to include other subjects or topics of their choice in planning and designing their own programme of education.

=== School years ===
Children are normally placed in year groups determined by the age they will attain at their birthday during the school year. In most cases progression from one year group to another is based purely on chronological age, although it is possible in some circumstances for a student to repeat or skip a year. Repetition may be due to a lack of attendance, for example due to a long illness, and especially in Years requiring standard tests. A child significantly more advanced than their classmates may be forwarded one or more years.

State-funded nursery education is available from the age of 3, and may be full-time or part-time, though this is not compulsory. If registered with a state school, attendance is compulsory beginning with the term following the child's fifth birthday. Children can be enrolled in the reception year in September of that school year, thus beginning school at age 4 or 4.5. Unless the student chooses to stay within the education system, compulsory school attendance ends on the last Friday in June during the academic year in which a student attains the age of 16.

In the vast majority of cases, pupils progress from primary to secondary levels at age 11; in some areas either or both of the primary and secondary levels are further subdivided. A few areas have three-tier education systems with an intermediate middle level from age 9 to 13. Years 12 and 13 are often referred to as "lower sixth form" and "upper sixth form" respectively, reflecting their distinct, voluntary nature as the A-level years. While most secondary schools enter their pupils for A-levels, some schools offer the International Baccalaureate or Cambridge International qualifications instead.

Age at birthday during school year	Year	Curriculum stage	State schools		
4	Nursery	Foundation Stage	Nursery School		
5	Reception	Foundation Stage	Infant School	Primary School	First School
6	Year 1	Key Stage 1	Infant School	Primary School	First School
7	Year 2	Key Stage 1	Infant School	Primary School	First School
8	Year 3	Key Stage 2	Junior School	Primary School	First School
9	Year 4	Key Stage 2	Junior School	Primary School	First School
10	Year 5	Key Stage 2	Junior School	Primary School	Middle School
11	Year 6	Key Stage 2	Junior School	Primary School	Middle School
12	Year 7	Key Stage 3	Secondary School or High School	Secondary School with Sixth Form	Middle School
13	Year 8	Key Stage 3	Secondary School or High School	Secondary School with Sixth Form	Middle School
14	Year 9	Key Stage 3	Secondary School or High School	Secondary School with Sixth Form	Upper School
15	Year 10	Key Stage 4 GCSE	Secondary School or High School	Secondary School with Sixth Form	Upper School
16	Year 11	Key Stage 4 GCSE	Secondary School or High School	Secondary School with Sixth Form	Upper School
17	Year 12 (Lower Sixth)	Key Stage 5 / Sixth Form A-level, BTEC, T-level, International Baccalaureate, Cambridge International, etc.	Sixth Form/FE College	Secondary School with Sixth Form	Upper School
18	Year 13 (Upper Sixth)	Key Stage 5 / Sixth Form A-level, BTEC, T-level, International Baccalaureate, Cambridge International, etc.	Sixth Form/FE College	Secondary School with Sixth Form	Upper School

== History ==
=== Origins ===
The first comprehensives were set up after the Second World War. A central feature of the London County Council (LCC) Schools Plan of 1947 was a proposal to establish 'a system of Comprehensive High Schools'. Earlier in 1946 Walworth School was an 'experimental' comprehensive school set up by the LCC, although London's first purpose built comprehensive was Kidbrooke School built in 1954. Also in 1946 the Windermere Grammar School though retaining the name became a (boys') comprehensive. On the Isle of Man, (a Crown dependency and not part of the United Kingdom) comprehensive education was also introduced in 1946. Mellow Lane School a co-educational comprehensive school was established in 1948 in Hayes then part of the former county of Middlesex. In Wales the first comprehensive school was Holyhead County School in Anglesey in 1949. Coventry opened two comprehensive schools in 1954 by combining grammar schools and secondary modern schools. These were Caludon Castle School and Woodlands School. Mount Grace School, Potters Bar which opened in 1954 was purpose-built as a comprehensive. Another early example was the 1956 Tividale Comprehensive School in Tipton. The first, purpose-built comprehensive in the North of England was Colne Valley High School near Huddersfield in 1956. These early comprehensives mostly modelled themselves, in terms of ethos, on the grammar school, with gown-wearing teachers conducting lessons in a very formal style. The opening of Risinghill School in Islington in 1960 offered an alternative to this model. Embracing the progressive ideals of 1960s education, such schools typically abandoned corporal punishment and brought in a more liberal attitude to discipline and methods of study.

Following the post WW2 education reform introducing tripartite secondary education pupils, excepting those in areas with the early comprehensives, sat an 11+ examination in their last year of primary education and were sent to one of a secondary modern, secondary technical or grammar school depending on their perceived ability. Secondary technical schools were never widely implemented however and for 20 years there was a virtual bipartite system which saw fierce competition for the available grammar-school places, which varied between 15% and 25% of total secondary places, depending on location. Comprehensive schooling was introduced on a widespread basis in 1965 by the Labour Government of the time. The largest expansion of comprehensive schools resulted from the policy decision taken in 1965 by Anthony Crosland, Secretary of State for Education in the 1964–1970 Labour government, a fervent supporter of comprehensive education. This had been the party's policy for some time. The policy decision was implemented by Circular 10/65, an instruction to local education authorities to plan for conversion.

In 1970 the Conservative Party re-entered government. Margaret Thatcher became Secretary of State for Education, and ended the compulsion on local authorities to convert. However, many local authorities were so far down the path that it would have been prohibitively expensive to attempt to reverse the process, and more comprehensive schools were established under Mrs Thatcher than any other education secretary. However, she went on to be a ferocious critic of comprehensive education. By 1975 the majority of local authorities in England and Wales had abandoned the eleven-plus examination and moved to a comprehensive system. Over that 10-year period many secondary modern schools and grammar schools were amalgamated to form large neighbourhood comprehensives, whilst a number of new schools were built to accommodate a growing school population. By 1968 around 20% of children had been in comprehensives, and by the mid-1970s the system had been almost fully implemented. Nearly all new schools were built as comprehensives, and existing grammar and modern schools had either been closed (see for example the Liverpool Institute) or amalgamated with neighbouring secondary moderns to produce comprehensive schools. A small number of local education authorities have held out against the trend, such as Kent. In those places, grammar schools, secondary modern schools and selection at 11 continue.

=== Developments from the mid-1970s ===
In 1976 the Labour Prime Minister James Callaghan gave a speech at Oxford's Ruskin College. He launched what became known as the "great debate" on education. He went on to list the areas he felt needed closest scrutiny: the case for a core curriculum, the validity and use of informal teaching methods, the role of school inspection and the future of the examination system. Callaghan was not the first to raise these questions. A "black paper" attacking liberal theories in education and poor standards in comprehensive schools had appeared in 1969, to be followed by a second in 1971. The authors were the academics Brian Cox and A.E. Dyson. They were supported by certain head teachers, notably Dr. Rhodes Boyson, who later became a Conservative MP. The black papers called for a return to traditional teaching methods and an end to the comprehensive experiment.

Since the 1988 Education Reform Act, parents have a right to choose which school their child should go to, or whether to not send them to school at all and to home educate them instead. The concept of "school choice" introduces the idea of competition between state schools, a fundamental change to the original "neighbourhood comprehensive" model, and is partly intended as a means by which schools that are perceived to be inferior are forced either to improve or, if hardly anyone wants to go there, to close down. Government policy is currently promoting "specialisation", whereby parents choose a secondary school appropriate for their child's interests and skills. Most initiatives focus on parental choice and information, implementing a pseudo-market incentive to encourage better schools. Both Conservative and Labour governments experimented with alternatives to the original neighbourhood comprehensive.

Experiments have included:

- Partnerships where successful schools share knowledge and best practice with nearby schools
- Federations of schools, where a partnership is formalised through joint governance arrangements
- City Technology Colleges, 15 new schools where one fifth of the capital cost is privately funded
- Academy schools, state schools not controlled by the local authority, which are allowed to select up to 10% of admissions by ability
- Free schools, state schools not controlled by the local authority, which are allowed to select up to 10% of admissions by ability

Following the advice of Cyril Taylor a former businessman and Conservative politician, and chairman of the Specialist Schools and Academies Trust (SSAT)—in the mid-1990s, all parties have backed the creation of specialist schools, which focus on excellence in a particular subject and are theoretically allowed to select up to 10% of their intake. This policy consensus had brought to an end the notion that all children will go to their local school, and assumes parents will choose a school they feel most meets their child's needs.

== See also ==
- Comprehensive School
- Education in England
- Education in Wales
