= Surrey Maths School =

Surrey Maths School (SuMS)
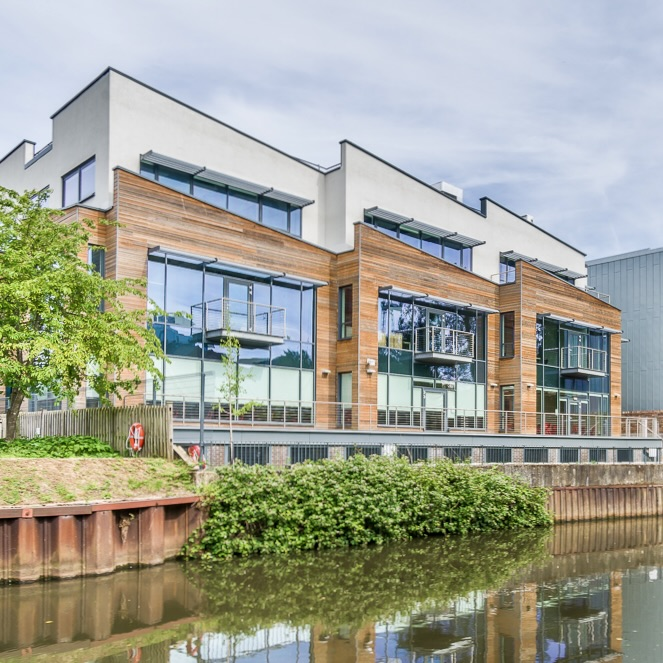
- School campus from the River Wey in 2026

Location
- Mary Road; Guildford, Surrey, GU1 4QU; England

Information
- Type: State-funded specialist maths school (16–19)
- Established: 2024
- Local authority: Surrey
- Co-Heads: Nora Kettleborough and Sahar Shillabeer
- Gender: Co‑educational
- Age: 16 to 19
- Enrolment: 83 up to 200
- Website: surreymathsschool.co.uk

Surrey Maths School (SuMS) is a state‑funded specialist mathematics school for students aged 16–19, located in Guildford, Surrey, England. The school opened to its first cohort of Year 12 students in September 2024 and is run in partnership with the University of Surrey. Surrey Maths School focuses on providing an advanced A‑level mathematics and STEM‑based curriculum for high‑attaining students from across the region.

== Overview ==
The school takes a different and unique approach to learning, emphasising on collaboration.

The school is led by Co‑Headteachers Nora Kettleborough and Sahar Shillabeer. Prior to joining SuMS, both served as Assistant Heads at King's College London Mathematics School (KCLMS), bringing experience from one of the UK's highest‑performing specialist maths schools.

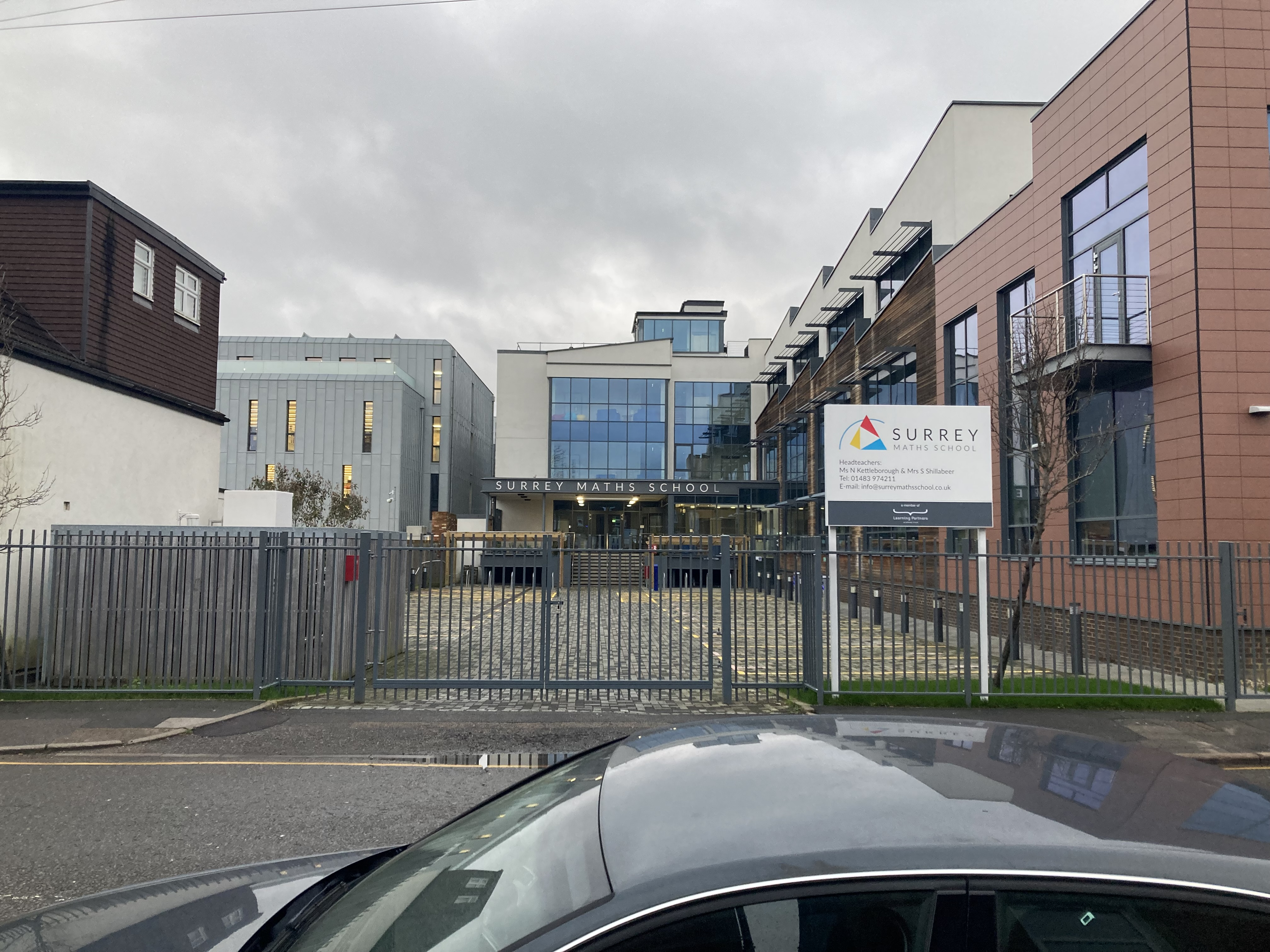
Surrey Maths Schools Building

They initially operated from temporary accommodation before relocating to its permanent site on Mary Road, Guildford. The permanent building is a refurbished former office space that was extensively redeveloped to create purpose‑built educational facilities, including classrooms, quiet rooms, laboratories, specialist SEN provision, an auditorium and a school hall. The refurbishment also involved upgrading the mechanical and electrical systems, installing new lighting and air‑handling units, and improving the roof and guttering. In total, the completed redevelopment provides 28,911 square feet of educational space, with the full project reaching completion in 2026.

Additionally Surrey Maths School is part of a small network of specialist mathematics schools in England, known as the U-Maths network, containing maths specialist schools partnered with universities. Established to act as regional centres of excellence for students with high aptitude in mathematics and related STEM subjects. U-Maths is a charity facilitating the success of the university maths school programme in England.

In May 2025, Ofsted carried out a monitoring visit to Surrey Maths School, its first inspection since opening in September 2024. The report noted significant progress in curriculum design and delivery, particularly in preparing students for STEM degrees, and described teaching and leadership as effective and enthusiastic. Inspectors also reported a supportive learning environment and appropriate safeguarding arrangements, highlighting the school's work with partners such as the University of Surrey to enhance student learning.

== Admissions ==
Admissions involve a written mathematics aptitude test, with high‑scoring applicants then invited to attend interviews held in the spring, after which conditional offers are made subject to GCSE results.

To be considered as a candidate to join Surrey maths school, students are required to perform in the SuMS aptitude test and interview process, as well as achieve a grade 8 or higher in GCSE Mathematics, and a grade 5 in GCSE English Language or Literature.

1. To study Physics, candidates are expected to achieve a grade 7 or above in GCSE Physics or 7-7 in GCSE Combined Science.
2. To study Chemistry, candidates are expected to achieve a grade 7 or above in GCSE Chemistry or 7-7 in GCSE Combined Science.
3. To study Computer Science, candidates are expected to achieve a grade 7 or above in GCSE Computer Science (if taken for GCSE) as well as a grade 6 in a subject with a substantial written component.
4. To study Economics, students are expected to achieve a grade 6 in a subject with a substantial written component.

Furthermore candidates are expected to achieve a grade 5 or above in 4 other GCSEs.

== Curriculum ==
All students at Surrey maths school are required to study A levels in mathematics and further mathematics, as with every specialist maths school. Students then pick up to 2 additional A levels from chemistry, physics, computer science or economics to complete their core studies. In their first year, all students also complete a group research project (SuMS Project Qualification), with research briefs set by university mentors and industry professionals and have dedicated problem solving classes to develop understanding beyond the curriculum. Students are then able to study for Extended Project Qualification (EPQ) in the second year if they choose not to take a fourth A level.
