= Alastair Pilkington =

British inventor

Sir Alastair Pilkington OBE FRS
- Born: Lionel Alexander Bethune Pilkington; 7 January 1920; Calcutta, India
- Died: 5 May 1995 (aged 75)
- Education: Trinity College, Cambridge
- Engineering career
- Significant advance: Float glass process

Sir Lionel Alexander Bethune Pilkington (7 January 1920 – 5 May 1995), known as Sir Alastair Pilkington, was a British engineer and businessman who invented and perfected the float glass process for commercial manufacturing of plate glass.

== Early life ==
Born on 7 January 1920 in Calcutta, India, he was the son of Colonel Lionel George Pilkington MC and his wife Evelyn Carnegie Bethune, sister of Sir Alexander Maitland Sharp Bethune, 10th Baronet. He was educated at Sherborne School and Trinity College, Cambridge, where his studies were interrupted by the outbreak of World War II. Joining the Royal Artillery, he was captured in the Battle of Crete and spent four years as a prisoner of war in Nazi Germany. Returning to university, he obtained a degree in mechanical science, followed in 1947 by a job as technical officer with the glass manufacturers Pilkington Brothers. He was not related to the Pilkington family which then controlled the business.

== Business career ==
In 1952 Pilkington invented the float glass process, in which molten glass was "floated" over a bath of molten tin and manipulated to achieve the required product thickness, and with his associate Kenneth Bickerstaff, spent seven years perfecting and patenting its commercially successful manufacture. American inventors had tried several times to achieve an improved and lower-cost process to replace the costly plate glass, but had not succeeded. His breakthrough was announced to the glassmaking world on 20 January 1959 and enabled Pilkingtons to dominate the world market for high quality flat glass for many years. Starting in the early 1960s, all the world's leading flat glass manufacturers obtained licences to use the float glass process. From technical director of Pilkingtons in 1955, he became deputy chairman in 1971 and chairman from 1973 until he reached retirement age in 1980, leaving the board in 1985. For the rest of his life he was the company's president.

== Outside activities and honours ==
In 1969 Pilkington was appointed a Fellow of the Royal Society and in 1970 a Knight Bachelor, as well as receiving the Wilhelm Exner Medal. In 1978 he was awarded the A. A. Griffith Medal and Prize and in 1983–1984 served as president of the British Science Association.

Outside directorships included appointments as a director of the Bank of England from 1974 to 1984 and a director of BP from 1976 to his death. A passionate advocate of tertiary education, he was from 1980 to 1990 Pro-Chancellor of Lancaster University, from 1990 Chairman of the Campaign for the University and Colleges of Cambridge and from 1994 to his death Chancellor of the University of Liverpool. He was chairman of the Council for National Academic Awards (CNAA) from 1983 to 1987.

The Pilkington Awards were established at Lancaster University in 1985 through funds donated by Sir Alastair Pilkington. These consist of cash grants for three undergraduates registered at Lancaster University for a single major or combined degree in chemistry, computing, engineering or physics. Since the mid-1990s, the University of Liverpool has used the annual Sir Alastair Pilkington Awards to honour staff members for their contributions to student learning. A building at the University of Liverpool is named in his honour. In May 2022 the Georgian portion of this building was renamed Gillian Howie House, while the Victorian part of the building has housed the University of Liverpool Mathematics School, an Ofsted "Outstanding" 16-19 Specialist Mathematics School, since September 2020. A reading room in Lancaster University's library is named in his honour.

== Family ==
In 1945 in London he married Patricia Nicholls Elliott, a former Women's Royal Naval Service officer who was the daughter of Rear-Admiral Frank Elliott OBE, and they had a daughter together with an adopted son. After his wife's death in 1977, in 1978 he married the American former radio actress Kathleen Wilson, widow of Eldridge Haynes.
