= University of Liverpool Mathematics School =

Location
- Sir Alastair Pilkington Building, Back Bedford Street, Central; Liverpool, L69 7SH; England, United Kingdom
- Coordinates: 53.4017°N 2.9669°W

Information
- Type: Maths school
- Motto: Education for 16–19 year olds
- Established: 1 September 2020
- Founders: University of Liverpool
- Local authority: Liverpool City Council
- Department for Education URN: 147477 Tables
- Ofsted: Reports
- Chair: Kathleen Johnson
- Head teacher: Damian Haigh
- Gender: Coeducational
- Age: 16 to 19
- Enrolment: 63 as of November 2022
- Capacity: 160
- Website: https://liverpoolmathsschool.org

University of Liverpool Mathematics School (abbreviated as University of Liverpool Maths School and ULMaS) is a coeducational maths school in Central, Liverpool, in the English county of Merseyside. It was opened by the University of Liverpool in September 2020 as the third specialist maths school in the country and the first in Northern England. It is located on the university's campus, in the Sir Alastair Pilkington Building, and offers a curriculum specialising in A-Level mathematics (including further mathematics), physics and computer science.

== History ==
The University of Liverpool Mathematics College will be a hub for the most able young mathematicians in the Liverpool city region so they can develop their knowledge and skills through the study of maths and related subjects. In today’s global economy it is essential that the UK develops the potential of our most able maths students and this initiative will help respond to that challenge.

— University of Liverpool Vice-Chancellor Janet Beer

In July 2018 the Department for Education, with Lord Agnew and Liz Truss, announced plans to establish the University of Liverpool Mathematics College. It would be a maths school offering the subjects of A-Level mathematics, further mathematics, physics, and computer science, and would enrol 80 students per year. An offer of music was also considered. The New Schools Network, made to support free schools (including maths schools), welcomed the announcement. The University of Liverpool promoted this college to Year Eleven pupils in multiple schools throughout April 2019.

By June 2020 the college's name had been changed to University of Liverpool Mathematics School. A headteacher, Damian Haigh, was appointed. The first teaching staff were recruited through video call as a result of the COVID-19 pandemic. The Department for Education reached a funding agreement with the University of Liverpool Mathematics School Trust to enable it to open the school in September 2020. The college opened on 1 September 2020 but the official opening ceremony did not take place until 30 September 2021. Doctor Steve Garnett was the guest of honour at the official opening ceremony, a business magnate who previously spoke at the college.

Between January 2021 and the start of March 2021, due to the COVID-19 pandemic, distance education arrangements were in effect. Physical face-to-face teaching resumed on 8 March under new preventative measures, such as compulsory face masks in areas where social distancing could not be enforced. Students were also offered campus COVID-19 tests and some testing equipment for home usage.
