= Maths school =

Specialist school

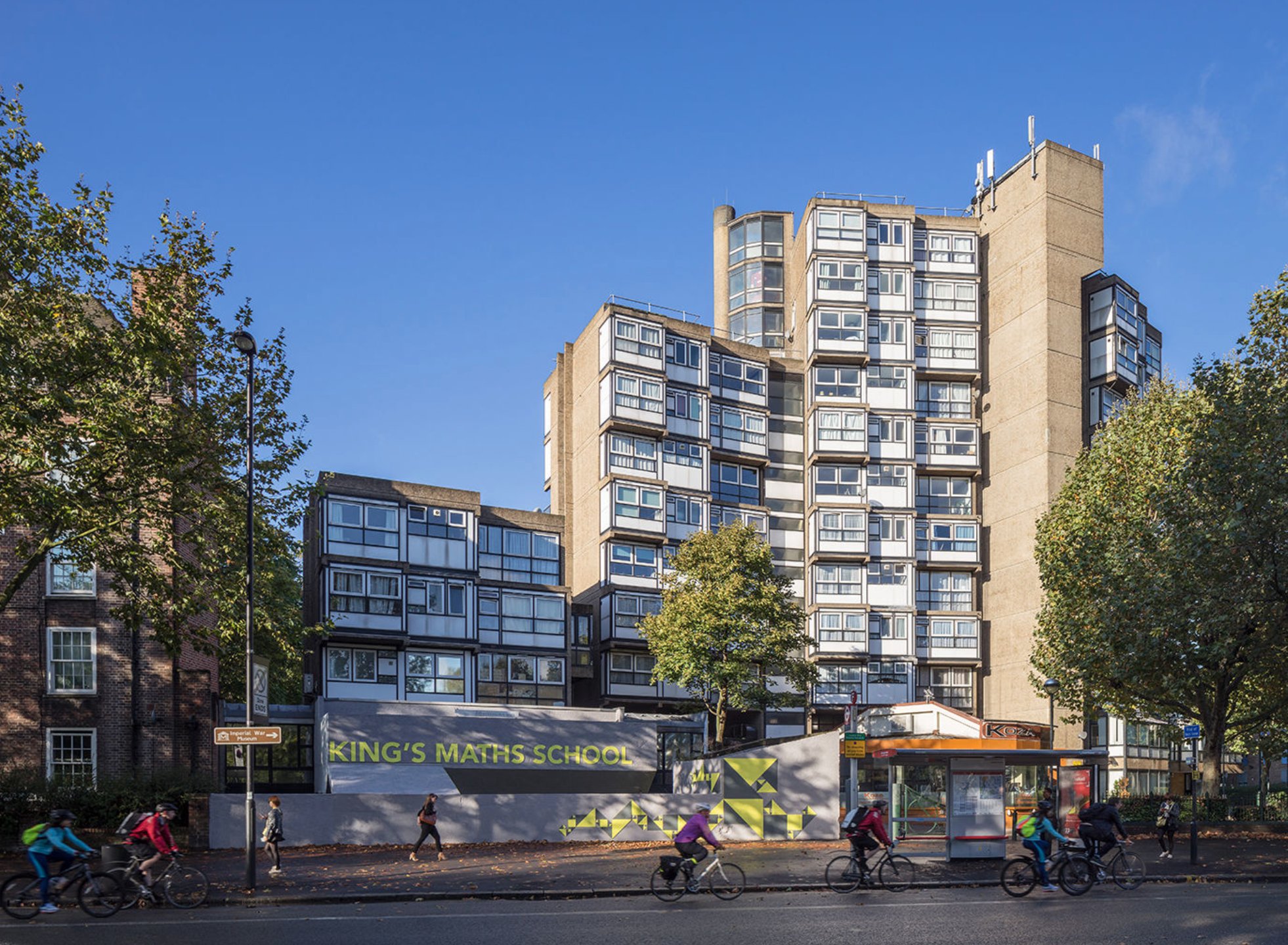
King's College London Mathematics School in London, England

A maths school is a type of specialist free school sixth form college in England which specialises in the study of mathematics. Each maths school is sponsored by a university and, frequently, also a nearby established sixth form college or multi-academy trust. All students in a maths school must follow a course of study that includes A-Levels in mathematics and further mathematics.

Maths schools receive additional funding from central government, above what a standard sixth form college would receive, with the aim of providing an enriched curriculum and student experience, so that students are better prepared for studies in mathematics or related subjects at competitive universities, or for careers requiring high levels of mathematical skill. Maths schools are selective and initially all students seeking to apply were required to achieve, at minimum, a grade 8 in GCSE mathematics. This is no longer the case for all maths schools, with some now accepting a grade 7 in GCSE mathematics. Students must also sit an entry exam before being admitted.

== Features of maths schools ==
Maths free schools are for 16 to 19 year pupils who have a great aptitude for maths. As set out in the government's Industrial Strategy, maths schools help to encourage highly skilled graduates in sectors that depend on science, technology, engineering and maths (STEM) skills. The aim of maths schools is to prepare the most mathematically able pupils to succeed in mathematics-related disciplines at highly selective maths universities and pursue mathematically intensive careers. Maths schools can also be centres of excellence in raising attainment, supporting and influencing the teaching of mathematics in their surrounding area, and are central to their associated universities’ widening participation commitments.

They are free schools, however they are unique in multiple ways. Free schools are legally barred from partaking in academic selection, however all maths schools are selective and therefore exempt from this rule. They are not required to follow both the School Admissions Code and the School Admission Appeal Code. Maths schools are, in most cases, housed in old repurposed buildings that have undergone refurbishment and remodelling. Every maths school is run by an academy trust, sponsored by a university and, sometimes additionally, an existing local sixth form college or multi-academy trust. Each year, they receive an additional £350,000 of funding from central government. The curricula of specialist maths schools are provided through partnerships with sponsor universities. All students at maths schools must study A-levels in mathematics and further mathematics and they usually study a mixture of; physics, chemistry, biology and computer science. They are exclusively for students aged 16 to 19, whereas normal free schools and other academies can serve students from primary education onwards.

Maths schools are required, as part of their core business, to deliver significant outreach work – programmes that help establish maths schools as centres of excellence. Outreach plans are developed in collaboration with local schools and colleges and are integral to the widening commitments of a maths school's sponsor university. They prioritise disadvantaged students, primarily girls, and raise awareness of the mathematics curriculum that will be offered by the school to potential students, preparing them for the study of advanced mathematics. Outreach programmes are complemented by maths hubs, regional leadership networks for mathematical improvement.

== History ==
Maths schools were conceptualised by Dominic Cummings during his time as adviser to Education Secretary Michael Gove in 2010. They were largely inspired by the Russian institutions of the same name, established by renowned mathematician Andrey Kolmogorov. They were announced by the Cameron–Clegg coalition a year later, with the aim of 12 being established over a three-year period. The first two maths schools, the King's College London Mathematics School and Exeter Mathematics School, opened in 2014.

In January 2017, Prime Minister Theresa May announced her intention for every British city to have a maths school. A budget of £170 million was allocated for this purpose. In November 2017, Chancellor of the Exchequer Philip Hammond granted an annual fund of £350,000 to every maths school. In March 2017 the Minister for Schools, Nick Gibb, promoted maths schools, asking multiple universities to establish them.

In September 2019, Education Secretary Gavin Williamson announced a plan to establish nine more specialist maths schools (for a total of eleven), with four already in development in Cambridge, Lancaster, Liverpool and Surrey. At the 2019 Conservative Party Conference it was announced that the eleven maths school would consist of at least one in every region of England and the establishment of one in Durham was confirmed. These plans were reinforced in March 2020 when Chancellor Rishi Sunak released that year's budget. The budget dedicated £7 million to the establishment of these maths schools. Further developments in 2020 included the announcement of a second maths school in London in July, the opening of the third maths school, University of Liverpool Maths School, in September, and the announcement of a maths school in Leeds in November. Further maths schools have opened since 2022. However, plans to open schools in Durham and Nottingham were paused by the UK government in October 2024 as part of a review of free schools programmes; the pause, was lifted in December 2025, but without new target opening dates.

== List of current and approved future maths schools ==
Year of opening	Name of maths school	Abbreviation	Region	Sponsoring organisation(s)
2014	King's College London Mathematics School	KCLMS	London	King's College London
2014	Exeter Mathematics School	EMS	South West	University of Exeter and Exeter College
2020	University of Liverpool Mathematics School	ULMaS	North West	University of Liverpool
2022	Lancaster University School of Mathematics	LUSoM	North West	Lancaster University and Cardinal Newman College
2023	Cambridge Mathematics School	CMS	East of England	University of Cambridge and the Eastern Learning Alliance
2023	Imperial College London Mathematics School	ICLMS	London	Imperial College London and Woodhouse College
2023	Leeds Mathematics School	LMaS	Yorkshire and the Humber	University of Leeds and Gorse Academies Trust
2024	Surrey Mathematics School	SuMS	South East	University of Surrey and Learning Partners Academy Trust
2025	Aston University Mathematics School	AUMS	West Midlands	Aston University
T.B.A.	University of Nottingham Mathematics School	UoNMS	East Midlands	University of Nottingham and East Midlands Education Trust
T.B.A.	Durham Mathematics School	DMS	North East	Durham University and Durham Sixth Form Centre

== See also ==
- University technical college
- Studio school
- Academy
- Free school
