= Gillian Howie =

Philosopher

Gillian Howie (4 October 1965 – 26 March 2013) was a Professor in Philosophy at the University of Liverpool and Director of the Institute for Feminist Theory and Research. She is author of Essential Reorientations: feminism and dialectical materialism (2008), Deleuze and Spinoza: Aura of Expressionism (2002), editor of Critical Quarterly’s special issue on higher education, ‘Universities in the UK: Drowning by numbers’ (2005) and editor of Women: A Cultural Review’s special issue on ‘Gender and Philosophy’ (2003). She also co-edited Third Wave Feminism: A Critical Exploration (2007; Revised ed.). Palgrave. ISBN 1-4039-1821-X, with the other co-editors Stacy Gillis and Rebecca Munford. She died of cancer 26 March 2013, aged 47.

== Bibliography ==
- Gillian Howie, Between Feminism and Materialism. A Question of Method, New York, Palgrave Macmillan, 2010, 268 p.
