= Eastern Learning Alliance =

UK multi academy trust

The Eastern Learning Alliance (ELA) is a multi-academy trust based in the East of England. It runs 11 state-funded schools in Cambridgeshire and Norfolk: five secondary schools, a primary school, a special school for autistic pupils, three post-16 colleges, and a specialist mathematics sixth form.

== History ==
Impington Village College became a standalone academy trust in 2012, and was registered as a corporate entity and a charitable company limited by guarantee. It became the Morris Education Trust (MET) in 2016. In 2020, the Cambridgeshire Educational Trust (CET) merged into MET to become Eastern Learning Alliance (ELA), bringing with it Chesterton Community College, Downham Market Academy and Girton Glebe Primary School. Witchford Village College also joined in 2020.

Impington International College, and The Cavendish School, a specialist school for autistic pupils - and the world's first International Baccalaureate autism school opened in September 2021 on the Impington Village College site, and Downham Market Sixth Form College became Athena Sixth Form College in the same year. Chesterton Community College opened a sixth form in 2022. In 2023, Cambridge Maths School, a specialist sixth-form college developed in partnership with the University of Cambridge, opened, and ELA took over Vista Academy Littleport, formerly Littleport and East Cambridgeshire Academy. The trust expanded its provision for special educational needs (SEN) pupils in 2024.

== Schools ==
School	Location	Type	Joined
Impington Village College International Sixth Form (2021)	Impington, Cambridgeshire	Secondary (11–18)	2012
Witchford Village College	Witchford, Cambridgeshire	Secondary (11–16)	2020
Chesterton Community College Chesterton Sixth Form (2022)	Cambridge	Secondary (11–18)	2020
Downham Market Academy Athena Sixth Form College (2021)	Downham Market, Norfolk	Secondary (11–18)	2020
Girton Glebe Primary School	Girton, Cambridgeshire	Primary	2020
The Cavendish School	Impington, Cambridgeshire	Special free school (7–18)	2021
Cambridge Maths School	Cambridge	16–19 free school	2023
Vista Academy Littleport	Littleport, Cambridgeshire	Secondary (11–16)	2023
