= Lancaster University School of Mathematics =

Location
- 67-69 London Road; Preston, Lancashire, PR1 4BA; England
- Coordinates: 53.759°N 2.685°W

Information
- Type: Maths school
- Executive Principal: Nick Burnham
- Head of School: Peter Tiltman
- Gender: Mixed
- Age: 16 to 19
- Website: http://www.lusom.ac.uk/

Lancaster University School of Mathematics, also known as LUSoM, is a maths school located in Preston, Lancashire, England. As a maths school, it is a specialist mathematics free school sixth form college.

The school was set up by the Rigby Education Trust, a single-academy trust set up in partnership between the Lancaster University and Cardinal Newman College for the purpose of opening and operating the school. It opened to students in September 2022 and is located in a £8.5 million school building on London Road, Preston, and is the first purpose-built specialist Maths School in the UK.

The school is highly selective, with prospective students expected to have GCSE mathematics qualification at grade 8 or 9 and required to sit an admissions assessment. The course structure at LUSoM requires all students to study A-level Mathematics and Further Mathematics and a third A-level from either Physics, Chemistry or Computer Science. In addition, students may select a fourth subject from those three, or choose any other A-level subject to be taught at Cardinal Newman College, which is located less than half a mile from the school site.
