= King's College London Mathematics School =

School in London, England

Coordinates: 51°29′46.47″N 0°6′42.58″W

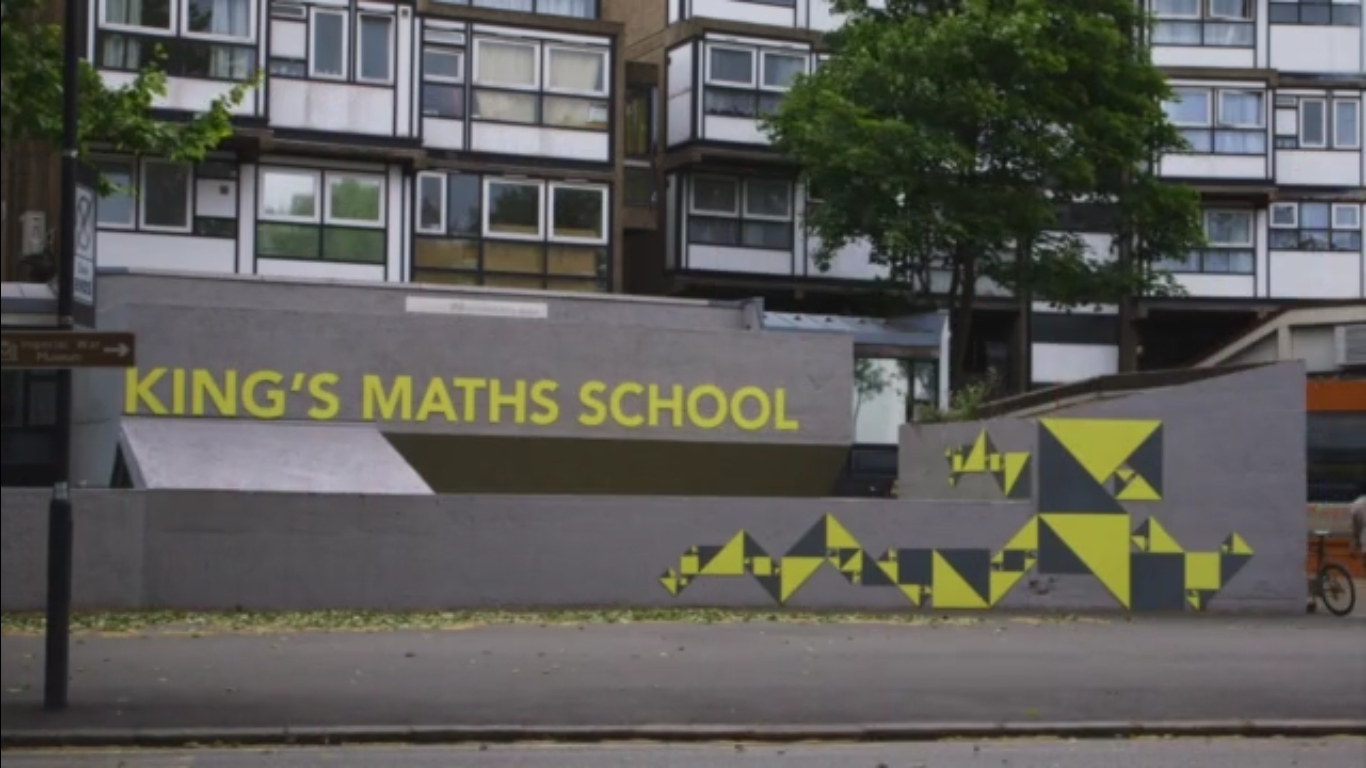

Location
- 80 Kennington Road; Lambeth; London, SE11 6NJ; England

Information
- Type: Free school sixth form
- Established: 1 September 2014
- Local authority: Lambeth
- Specialist: Mathematics
- Department for Education URN: 140564 Tables
- Ofsted: Reports
- Patron: The Duke of Wellington
- Head Teacher: Mr Timothy Bateup
- Gender: Mixed
- Age: 16 to 19
- Website: https://www.kingsmathsschool.com/

King's College London Mathematics School, also known as King's Maths School or KCLMS, is a maths school located in the Lambeth area of London, England. King's College London Mathematics School is run in partnership with King's College London. The school was inspired by the Kolmogorov Physics and Mathematics School in Moscow, established in 1965 by mathematician Andrey Kolmogorov. The school aims to widen participation in the mathematical sciences by supporting young people from backgrounds currently under-represented in these fields.

The school opened in 2014 and specialises in mathematics. It has an approximate 6% acceptance rate. In 2024, the school received nearly 1100 applications for 70 places. All prospective students are invited to take a written mathematics aptitude test. Those with a high score on the test are invited to an interview that consists of a mathematics interview and a personal interview.

Prospective students are required to obtain GCSE qualifications at grade 8 or 9 (or previous grade A*) in Mathematics and either grade 7 or above (or previous grade A or A*) in Physics or grade 7-7 or above in Combined Science. In addition, prospective students are required to obtain a grade 5 or above (or previous grade C) in a total of at least seven GCSEs, including in English Language.

The course structure of King's College London Mathematics School requires all students to study A-levels in mathematics, further mathematics and physics. In their first year, students also choose between an AS-level in either computer science or economics, and complete a substantive, collaborative research project ("King's Certificate") with briefs set by academics and industry professionals. In their second year, students can engage with a unique programme of extension courses ("Curriculum X") and also have the option to complete an Extended Project Qualification (EPQ).

In 2024, 77% of all A-level entries were graded A* and 98% of all A-level entries were A*/A. Furthermore, over 38% of leavers received Oxbridge places. These results placed King's College London Mathematics School as the top performing school in the country for A Level attainment.

The Sunday Times 2018 School Guide, selected King's College London Mathematics School as the State Sixth Form College of the Year. The Sunday Times also selected it as the Best State Sixth Form college of the Decade in 2021.

In December 2024, King’s College London Mathematics School was awarded the titles of Sixth Form College of the Year 2025 and Sixth Form College of the Year for Academic Excellence 2025 by The Sunday Times in the Parent Power schools guide.
