= Cambridge International General Certificate of Education =

International school leaving certificate

The Cambridge International General Certificate of Education: Advanced Level (formally also known as the University of Cambridge International General Certificate of Education: Advanced Level ; informally also known as International (GCE) A-Level(s), Cambridge (GCE) A-Level(s) or Cambridge International (GCE) AS and A Level) is an international school-leaving qualification for admission to universities worldwide including the University of Cambridge, the University of Oxford, Harvard, Stanford and all Ivy League institutions.

== Overview ==
Cambridge International A-Levels are exam-based qualifications, which are created, corrected, administered and regulated by Cambridge (i.e. a sub-organization and a department of the University of Cambridge). Cambridge International A-Levels are the international variant of the British qualification of the same title. Cambridge International A-Levels are studied in over 10,000 schools worldwide in 160 countries including in Pakistan, India, China, Japan, Canada, United States, France, Germany, Russia, Australia, South Africa and in the United Kingdom.

== Structure and curriculum ==
Cambridge International A-Levels, although fundamentally similar, differ significantly in structure, format and content from the British variant. For example, examinations for Cambridge International A-Levels occur twice annually, in October/November and in May/June; whereas the examinations for the British qualification only take place once a year: in May/June. Nevertheless, Cambridge International A-Levels are recognized for admission to all universities in the United Kingdom.

Cambridge International A-Levels are generally studied and completed over a period of two years and terminated with written examinations. Students (also called "(exam) candidates") have the possibility to either complete all papers (papers=exams) for a Cambridge International A-Level qualification in one exam session or to follow a "staged assessment" route where they complete half of the papers necessary for a full Cambridge International A-Level credential and receive a Cambridge International "Advanced Subsidiary" Level (AS-Level) attestation; either as a stepping-stone for a full Cambridge International A-Level diploma or to attain an independent Cambridge International AS-Level certificate.

Cambridge offers examinations in 55 different subjects, including Mathematics, Physics, Chemistry, Biology and others such as Sciences as well as Social Sciences like Economics, Business Studies and languages such as English, French, German, Chinese or Arabic. A student typically studies four subjects at Cambridge International AS-Level and finishes three of those subjects at Cambridge International A-Level. Each subject a student completes receives a separate grade. The different grades are allocated according to "difficulty" in exams by applying a so-called "grade threshold" scheme. The grades are internationally recognized and contain clear guidelines for the explanations of the achieved standards. Cambridge International A-Levels are graded on a scale ranging from A* (the highest grade) to E (the lowest passing grade). With Cambridge International AS-Levels there isn't an A*; the grades here range from A to E.

There is complete flexibility in the choice and combination for the three subjects within Cambridge International A-Levels. A student may, therefore, decide for only three sciences (e.g. Maths, Physics & Chemistry) or only three humanities (e.g. English, French, History) or a combination of both (e.g. English, Maths, History). There is also no official obligation to complete the three subjects at a specific time: Since Cambridge International A-Levels are linear, most students complete the exams of their three subjects all at once at the end of their course. However, students may equally complete one subject after another at different stages of their studies.

== Recognition ==
The Cambridge International General Certificate of Education: Advanced Level is recognized for entrance to universities across the globe including in the United Kingdom, United States, Canada, Australia, New Zealand, India, China, Japan, Russia, Singapore, Egypt, Jordan, South Africa, the Netherlands, France, Germany and Spain.

Due to the Lisbon Recognition Convention, Cambridge International A-Levels are accepted for admission to universities in over 50 countries. Over 500 US universities and colleges accept Cambridge International AS- and A-Levels, including Stanford, Harvard and all Ivy League institutions. Numerous research studies have revealed that the Cambridge International General Certificate of Education – Advanced Level Programme is comparable to other, in the USA longer-established, educational qualifications, including the Advanced Placement (AP) credential and the International Baccalaureate Diploma (IB).

In the United Kingdom, Cambridge International A-Levels are recognized for admission to all universities (including Oxbridge).
