= Exeter Mathematics School =

School in Exeter, Devon, England

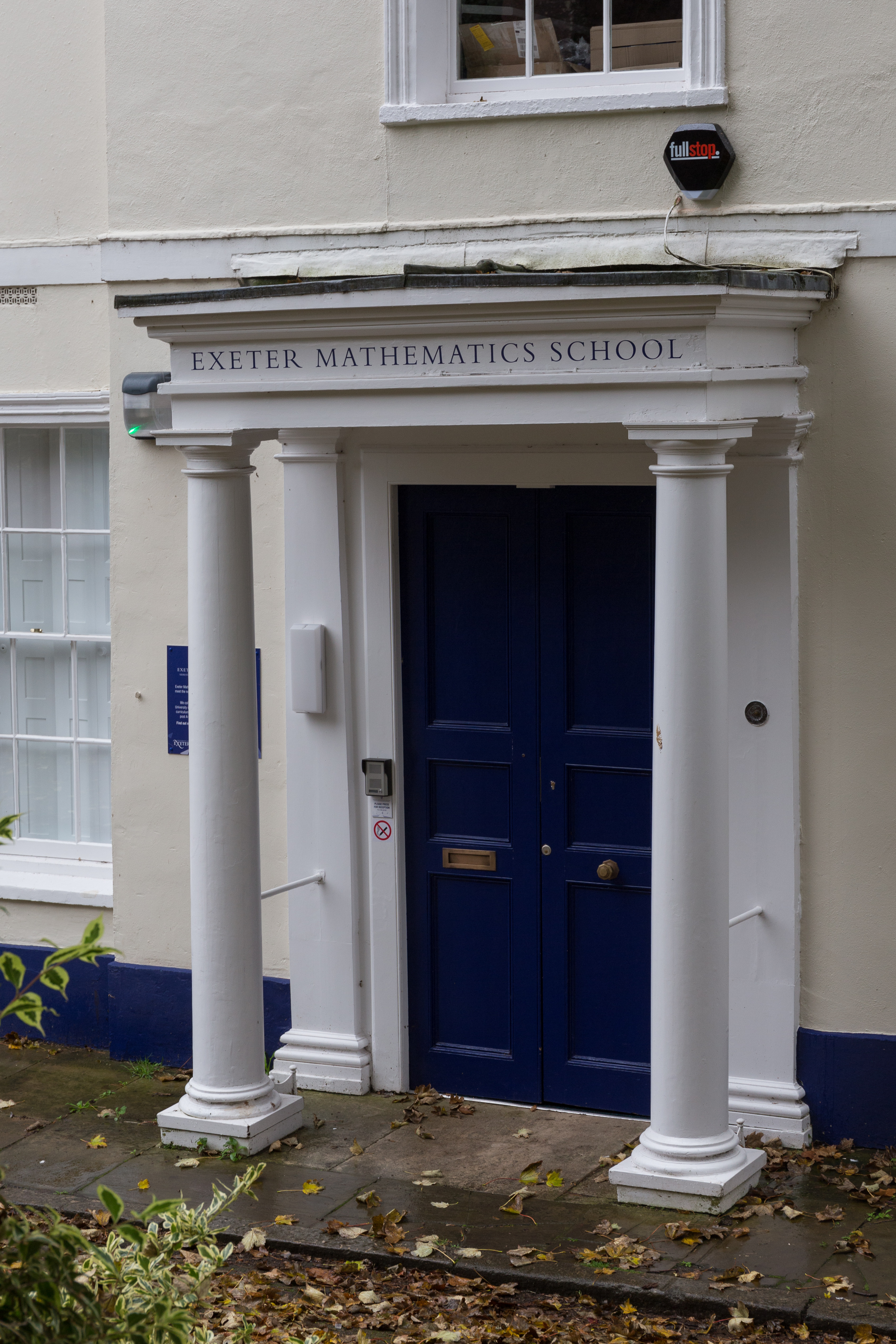
- Front entrance of the school

Location
- Rougemont House; Castle Road; Exeter, Devon, EX4 3PU; England; 50.7261°N 3.5296°W

Information
- Type: Free school sixth form
- Motto: Freedom for Thinkers
- Established: 1 September 2014
- Local authority: Devon County Council
- Specialist: Mathematics
- Department for Education URN: 140971 Tables
- Ofsted: Reports
- Headteacher: Kerry Burnham
- Gender: Mixed
- Age: 16 to 19
- Enrollment: 128 (2025)
- A-Level average: 47.06 (A−)
- Website: www.exetermathematicsschool.ac.uk

Listed Building – Grade II*
- Official name: Rougemont House
- Designated: 29 January 1953
- Reference no.: 1169610

Exeter Mathematics School is a maths school located in Exeter in the English county of Devon.

The school opened in September 2014 under the free schools initiative and is sponsored by Exeter College and the University of Exeter. It is intended to be a regional centre of excellence in mathematics for Cornwall, Devon, Dorset and Somerset. From September 2026, the school's catchment area will be expanded to also include students from Bristol, Gloucestershire, and Wiltshire. The school offers boarding facilities for pupils who live more than an hour's drive away from the school. A total of 120 students are catered for at the school with some boarding from Monday to Friday during term time.

== Admission and curriculum ==
The school is highly selective, with prospective students expected to have GCSE qualifications at grade 8-9 in Mathematics and Physics or Computer Science. Prospective students must also have six GCSEs in total at grade 5 or above including English at grade 6. The course structure of Exeter Mathematics School requires all students to study A-level Mathematics and Further Mathematics and either A-level Physics or Computer Science. Students may choose to study both, but one may be chosen and an additional A-level from a wider range of options, which are taught at Exeter College, may be taken as an alternative.

== Boarding ==
Boarding is offered to students who would otherwise have to spend more than an hour commute to the school. As of the 2026/27 academic year, the cost of boarding at the school is £13,290 a year. However, bursaries are available to students from low-income families, defined as families who earn less than £47,287 a year.

Boarders are supported and supervised by a team of pastoral tutors on site. These students are also encouraged to learn how to cook and work towards a Food Hygiene Certificate.

== Outreach and public reception ==
Inspection reports have noted the school's high proportion of students from disadvantaged backgrounds, who would not have access to opportunities and advanced education in mathematics without the school. The school also admits more students with Special Educational Needs and Disabilities (SEND) than national average. It has also been praised for initiatives in the local community, such as "a computer science hub for primary schools, a “maths student community” for year 8s and a fortnightly GCSE enhancement course", in addition to teacher training schemes.

Some commentators, such as Lynne McClure, have argued that the opportunities and high-quality education offered at Exeter Maths School (and other specialist schools of its kind) should be available at all schools, not just restricted to a few. Similarly, writing for School Weeks, Jess Staufenberg argued, "why not run similar models for struggling modern foreign languages? And, while we’re at it, why not fund all FE provision at this level?"
