= University of Liverpool =

University in Liverpool, England

Coordinates: 53.406°N 2.967°W

- Coat of arms
- Latin: Universitas Lyrpulensis
- Other name: UOL
- Former name: University College Liverpool
- Motto: Latin: Haec otia studia fovent
- Motto in English: These days of peace foster learning
- Type: Public
- Established: 1881 – University College Liverpool; 1884 – affiliated to the federal Victoria University; 1903 – royal charter
- Academic affiliations: N8 Group; Russell Group; UASR; URA; Universities UK; Defence Universities Alliance; UGC-only Indian campus
- Endowment: £202.9 million (2025)
- Budget: £722.9 million (2024/25)
- Visitor: The Lord President of the Council ex officio
- Chancellor: Wendy Beetlestone
- Vice-Chancellor: Tim Jones
- Academic staff: 3,520 (2024/25)
- Administrative staff: 0 (2024/25)
- Students: 31,050 (2024/25); 28,215 FTE (2024/25)
- Undergraduates: 23,490 (2024/25)
- Postgraduates: 7,560 (2024/25)
- Location: Liverpool, England
- Campus: 100 acres (40 ha); Urban
Colours
- Website: liverpool.ac.uk

The University of Liverpool (abbreviated UOL) is a public research university in Liverpool, England. Founded in 1881 as University College Liverpool and affiliated with Victoria University in 1884, it received a royal charter from King Edward VII in 1903, thereby attaining the authority to award degrees independently. The university holds and operates assets on the National Heritage List, such as the Liverpool Royal Infirmary (origins in 1749), the Ness Botanic Gardens, and the Victoria Gallery & Museum.

Organised into three faculties divided by 35 schools and departments, the university offers more than 230 first degree courses across 103 subjects. It is a founding member of the Russell Group, and the research intensive association of universities in Northern England, the N8 Group. The phrase "redbrick university" was inspired by the Victoria Building; thus, the university claims to be the original redbrick university, and uses it in its brand tagline.

Liverpool is the first UK university to establish departments in oceanography, civic design, architecture, and biochemistry (at the Johnston Laboratories, now re-named Department of Biochemistry, Cell and Systems Biology, University of Liverpool), and also the first to establish an independent university campus in Suzhou, China, known as Xi'an Jiaotong–Liverpool University. The university also founded the University of Liverpool Mathematics School, a specialist A-level maths school, located on the university campus. The university launched a second international campus in Bengaluru, India. The university has the ninth-largest endowment of any university in the UK, and in 2024/25, it had an income of £722.9 million, of which £126.2 million was from research grants and contracts, with an expenditure of £723.5 million.

As of 2024, the university holds four academic fellows of the Academy of Social Sciences and one of the British Academy. Ten Nobel Prize laureates have been affiliated with the University of Liverpool as alumni or academic staff, with notable alumni leading fields in medicine, law, business, engineering, the arts, politics, and technology. Graduates of the university are styled with the post-nominal letters, Lpool, to indicate the institution.

== History ==
=== University College Liverpool ===
The university was established in 1881 as College Liverpool, admitting its first students in 1882. In 1884, it became part of the federal Victoria University. In 1894 Oliver Lodge, a professor at the university, made the world's first public radio transmission and two years later took the first surgical X-ray in the United Kingdom. The Liverpool University Press was founded in 1899, making it the third-oldest university press in England. Students in this period were awarded external degrees by the University of London.

=== University status ===
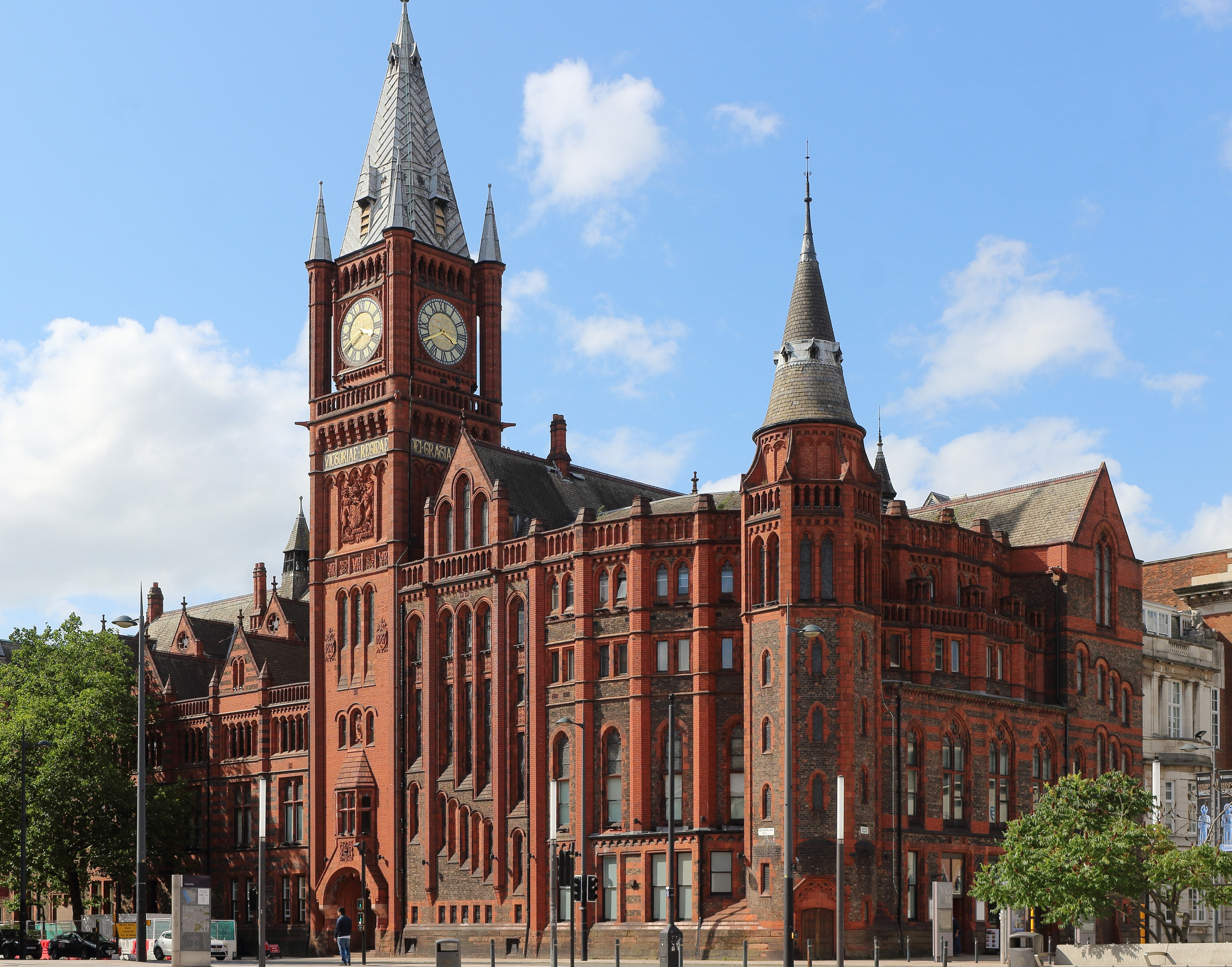
The centrepiece of the university estate, the Victoria Building, opened in 1892 as the first purpose built facility for the university. The building was the inspiration for the term "red brick university" which was coined by Edgar Allison Peers.

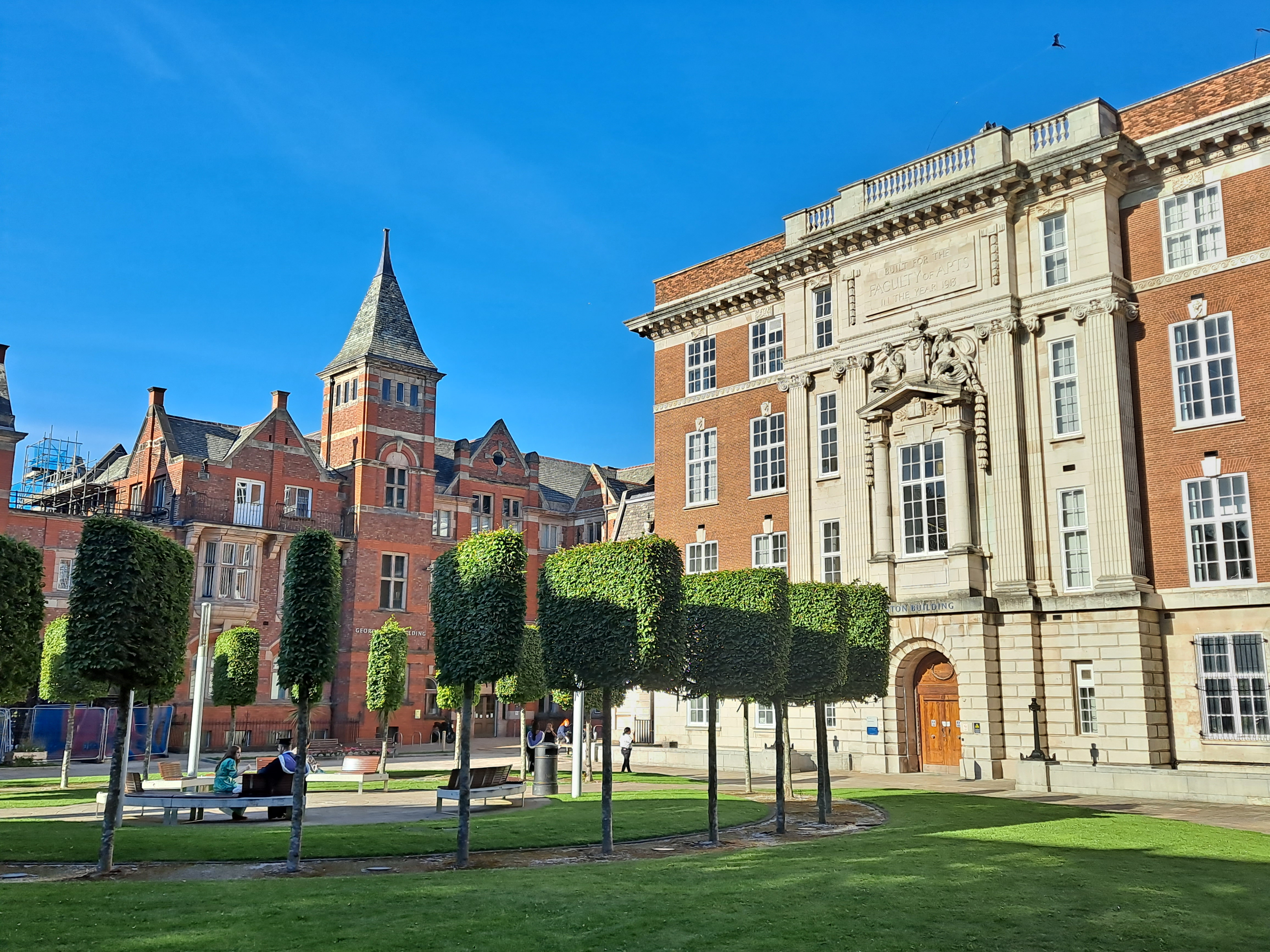
The Quadrangle, University of Liverpool

Following a royal charter and an act of Parliament in 1903, it became an independent university (the University of Liverpool) with the right to confer its degrees. The next few years saw major developments at the university, including Sir Charles Sherrington's discovery of the synapse and William Blair-Bell's work on chemotherapy in the treatment of cancer. In the 1930s to 1940s, Sir James Chadwick and Sir Joseph Rotblat made major contributions to the development of the atomic bomb. From 1943 to 1966, Allan Downie, Professor of Bacteriology, was involved in the eradication of smallpox.

In 1994, the university was a founding member of the Russell Group, a collaboration of twenty leading research-intensive universities, as well as a founding member of the N8 Group in 2004. In the 21st century physicists, engineers and technicians from the University of Liverpool were involved in the construction of the Large Hadron Collider at CERN, working on two of the four detectors in the LHC.

In 2004, Sylvan Learning, later known as Laureate International Universities, became the worldwide partner for University of Liverpool online. In 2019, it was announced that Kaplan Open Learning, part of Kaplan, Inc., would be the new partner for the University of Liverpool's online programmes. Laureate continued to provide some teaching provision for existing students until 2021.

The university has produced ten Nobel Prize winners, from the fields of science, medicine, economics and peace. The Nobel laureates include the physician Sir Ronald Ross, physicist Charles Barkla, physicist Martin Lewis Perl, the physiologist Sir Charles Sherrington, physicist Sir James Chadwick, chemist Sir Robert Robinson, chemist Har Gobind Khorana, physiologist Rodney Porter, economist Ronald Coase and physicist Joseph Rotblat. Sir Ronald Ross was also the first British Nobel laureate in 1902. The university is also associated with Ronald Finn and Sir Cyril Clarke who jointly won the Lasker-DeBakey Clinical Medical Research Award in 1980 and Sir David Weatherall who won the Lasker-Koshland Special Achievement Award in Medical Science in 2010. These Lasker Awards are popularly known as America's Nobels.

Over the 2013/2014 academic year, members of staff took part in numerous strikes after staff were offered a pay rise of 1% which unions equated to a 13% pay cut since 2008. The strikes were supported by both the university's Guild of Students and the National Union of Students. Some students at the university supported the strike, occupying buildings on campus.

== Campus and facilities ==
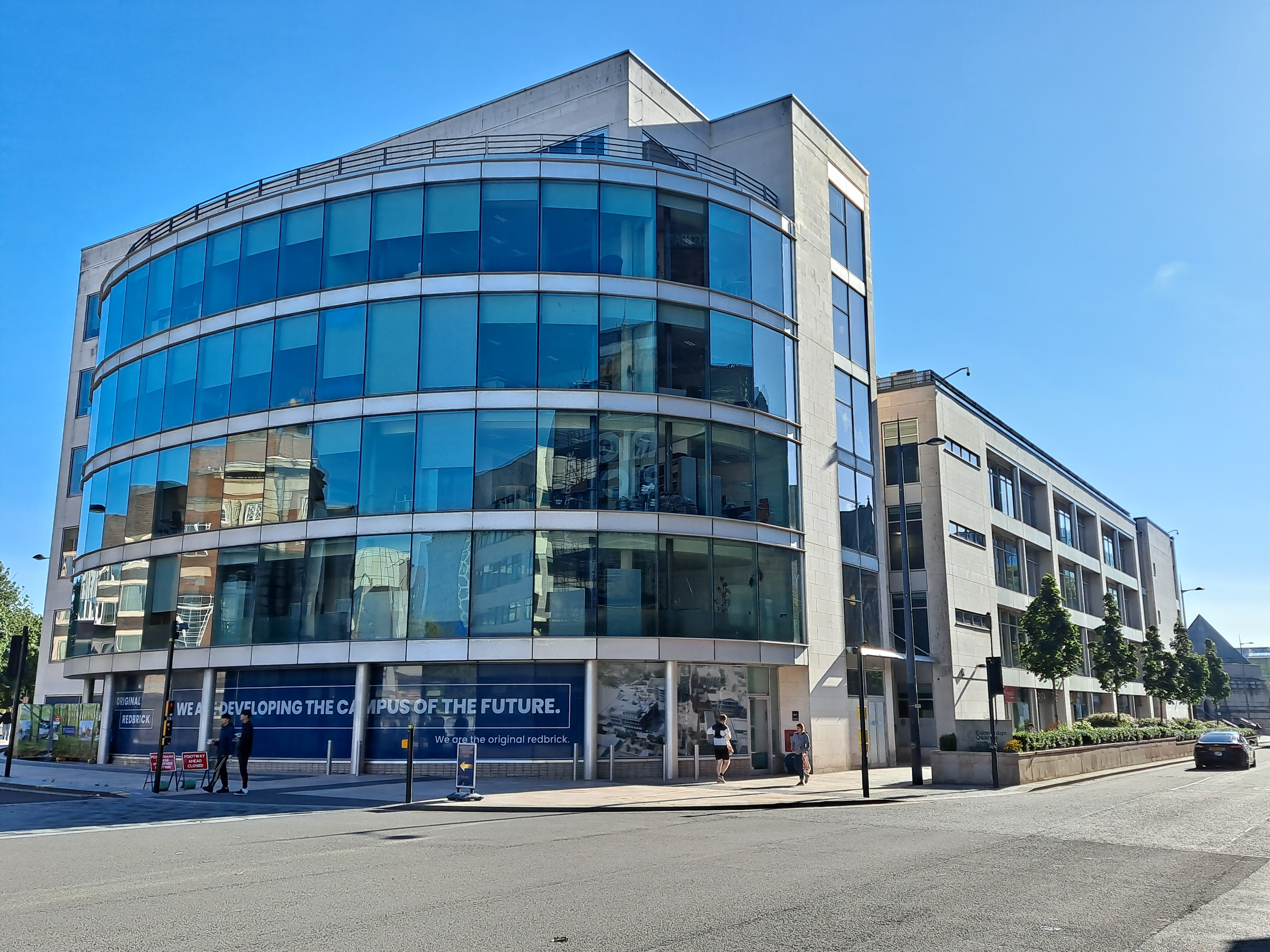
The Foundation Building, one of the university's main administrative facilities.

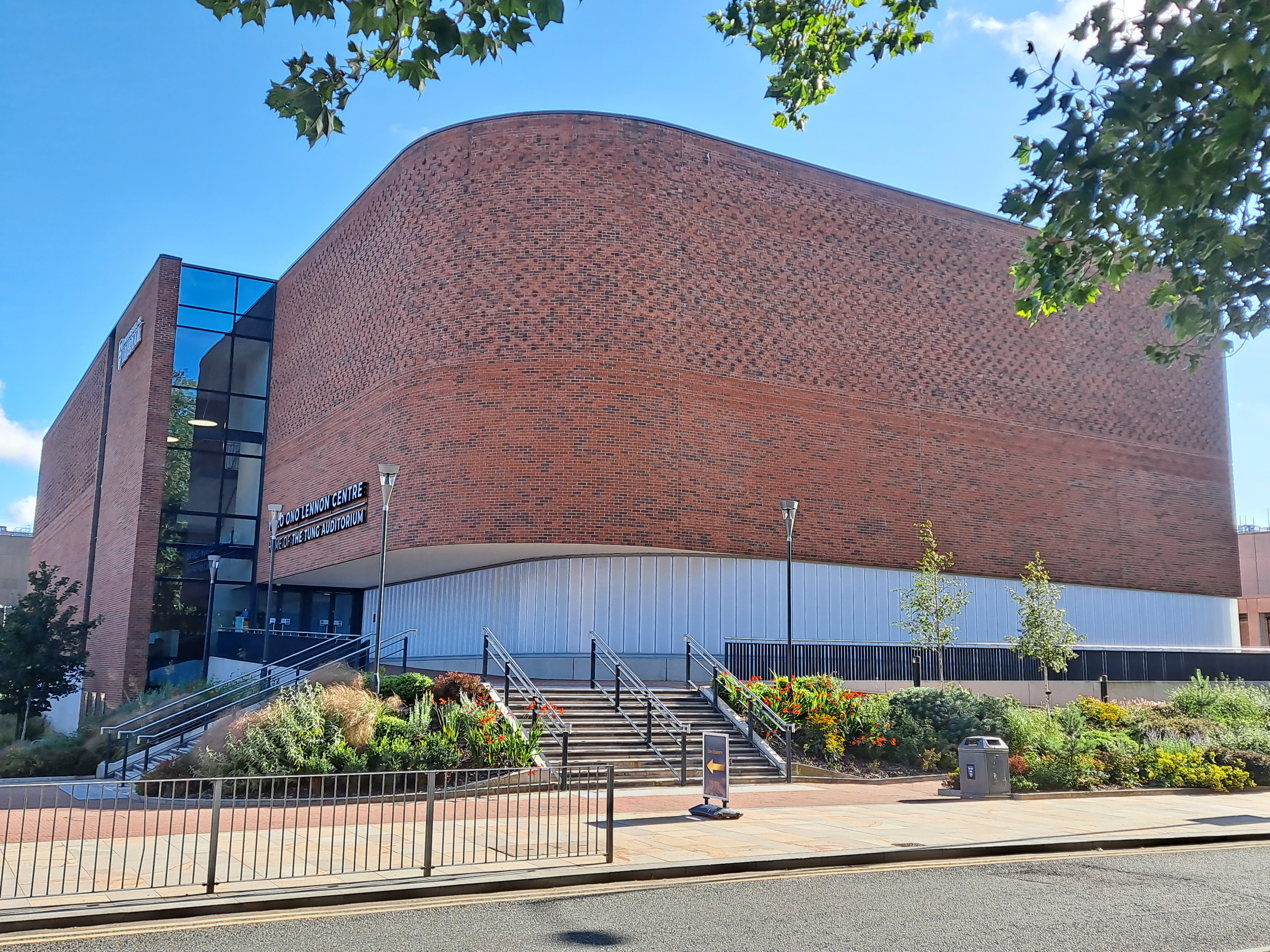
The Yoko Ono Lennon Centre, opened in 2022.

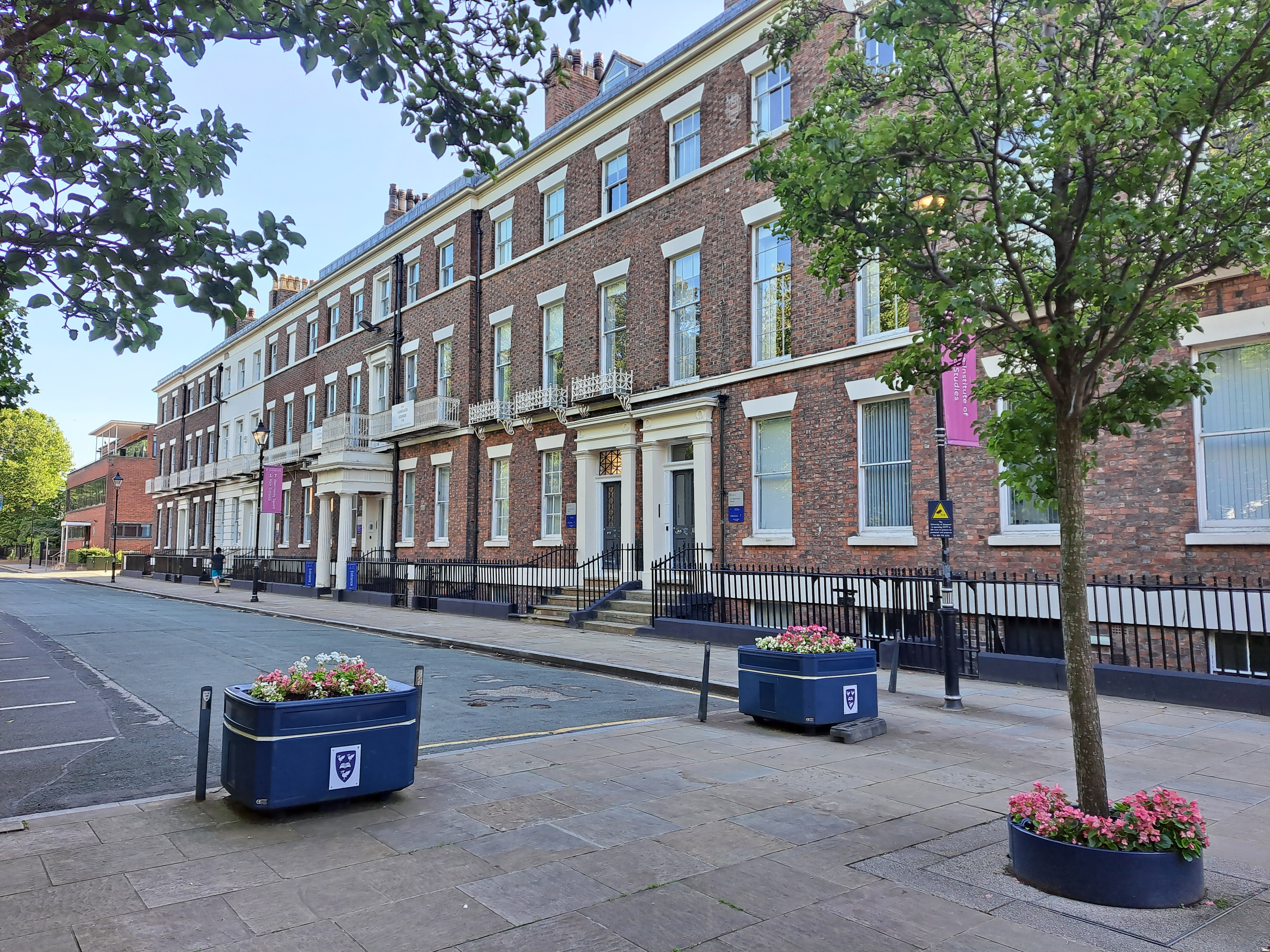
Abercromby Square, home to numerous university departments.

The university is mainly based around a single urban campus approximately five minutes walk from Liverpool City Centre, at the top of Brownlow Hill and Mount Pleasant. Occupying 100 acres (40 ha), it contains 192 non-residential buildings that house 69 lecture theatres, 114 teaching areas, and research facilities.

The main site is divided into three faculties: Health and Life Sciences; Humanities and Social Sciences; and Science and Engineering. The Veterinary Teaching Hospital (Leahurst) and Ness Botanical Gardens are based on the Wirral Peninsula. There was formerly a marine biology research station at Port Erin on the Isle of Man until it closed in 2006.

Fifty-one residential buildings, on or near the campus, provide 3,385 rooms for students, on a catered or self-catered basis. The centrepiece of the campus remains the university's original red brick building, the Victoria Building. Opened in 1892, it was restored in 2008 as the Victoria Gallery and Museum, completed with a café and activities for school visits.

In 2011 the university made a commitment to invest £660m into the 'Student Experience', £250m of which will reportedly be spent on Student Accommodation. Announced so far have been two large On-Campus halls of residences (the first of which, Vine Court, opened September 2012), new Veterinary Science facilities, and a £10m refurbishment of the Liverpool Guild of Students. New Central Teaching Laboratories for physics, earth sciences, chemistry and archaeology were opened in autumn 2012.

From 2013 to 2020, the University of Liverpool operated a satellite campus in Finsbury Square in London, offering a range of professionally focused masters programmes.

=== Central Teaching Hub ===
The Central Teaching Hub is a large multi-use building that houses a recently refurbished Lecture Theatre Block (LTB) and teaching facilities (Central Teaching Labs, CTL) for the Departments of Chemistry and Physics and the School of Environmental Sciences, within the university's Central City Centre Campus. It was completed and officially opened in September 2012 with an estimated project cost of £23m. The main building, the 'Central Teaching Laboratory', is built around a large atrium and houses seven separate laboratories that can accommodate 1,600 students at a time. A flexible teaching space, computing centre, multi-departmental teaching spaces, and communal workspaces can also be found inside. The adjoining University Lecture Block building contains four lecture rooms and further social spaces.

=== Sustainability ===
In 2008, the University of Liverpool was voted joint seventeenth greenest university in Britain by WWF supported company Green League. This represents an improvement after finishing 55th in the league table the previous year.

The position of the university is determined by point allocation in departments such as Transport, Waste management, sustainable procurement and Emissions among other categories; these are then transpired into various awards. Liverpool was awarded the highest achievement possible in Environmental policy, Environmental staff, Environmental audit, Fair trade status, Ethical investment policy and Waste recycled while also scoring points in Carbon emissions, Water recycle and Energy source.

Liverpool was the first among UK universities to develop their desktop computer power management solution, which has been widely adopted by other institutions. The university has subsequently piloted other advanced software approaches further increasing savings. The university has also been at the forefront of using the Condor HTC computing platform in a power saving environment. This software, which makes use of unused computer time for computationally intensive tasks usually results in computers being left turned on. The university has demonstrated an effective solution for this problem using a mixture of Wake-on-LAN and commercial power management software.

The Interdisciplinary Centre for Sustainability Research (ICSR) was established in 2024 to tackle the United Nations Sustainable Development Goals (SDGs).

=== Indian campus ===
In 2026, the University of Liverpool established its Indian campus in Bengaluru, Karnataka, marking the institution's first campus in India. The campus was opened as part of the university's strategy to expand its global presence and extend its academic legacy by offering University of Liverpool degree programmes in India.

== Organisation and structure ==
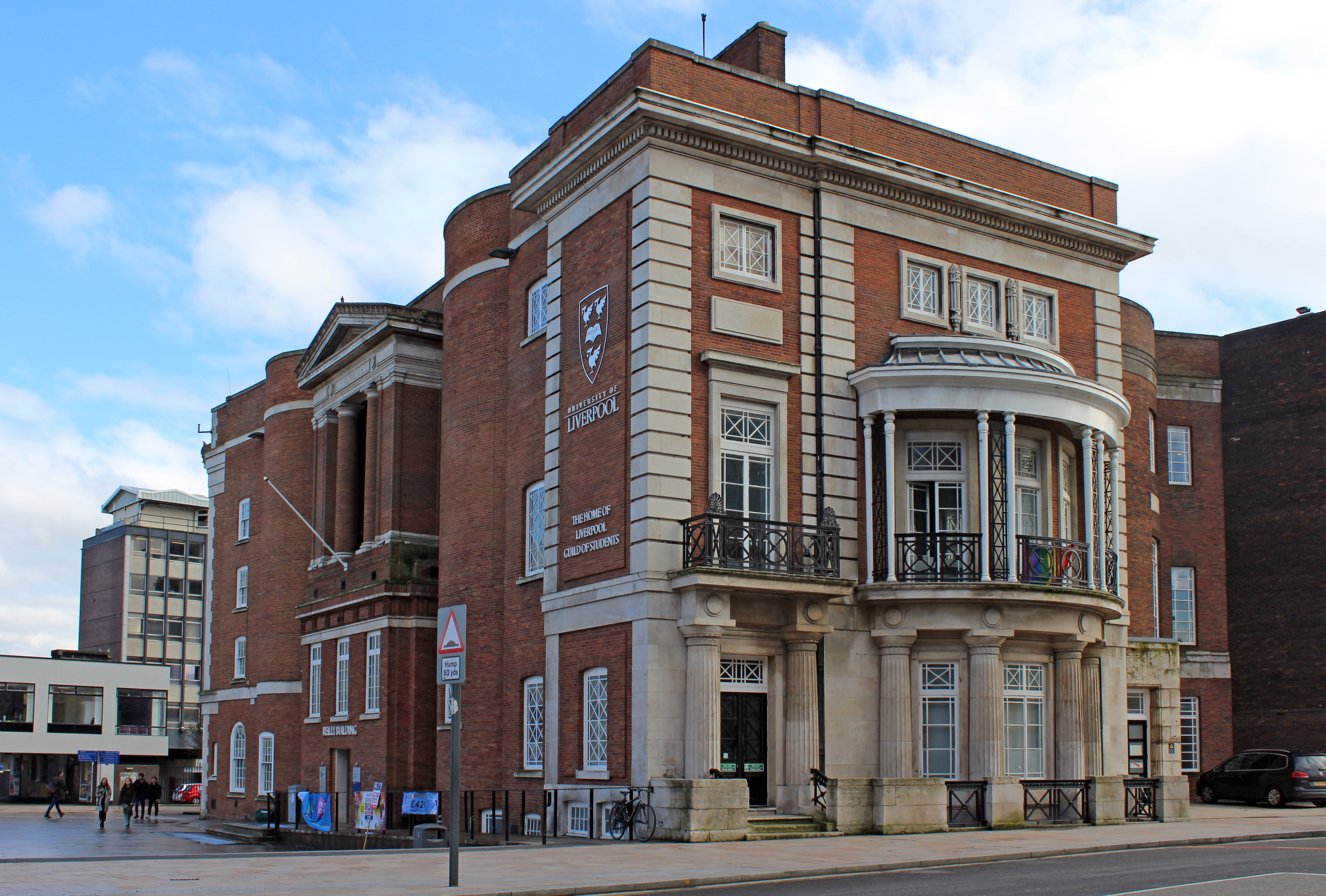
Liverpool Guild of Students

The university is a research-based university with 33,000 students pursuing over 450 programmes spanning 54 subject areas. It has a broad range of teaching and research in both arts and sciences, and the University of Liverpool School of Medicine established in 1835 is today one of the largest medical schools in the UK. It also has close links to the neighbouring Royal Liverpool University Hospital.

The university has a students' union to represent students' interests, known as the Liverpool Guild of Students.

The university previously had a strategic partnership with Laureate Education, a for-profit college collective, for University of Liverpool online degrees. In 2019, the university announced a new partnership with Kaplan Open Learning for delivery of their online degrees.

=== Senior leadership ===
The figurehead of the university is the chancellor. The following have served in that role:

- 1903–1908: Frederick Arthur Stanley, 16th Earl of Derby
- 1908–1948: Edward Stanley, 17th Earl of Derby
- 1948–1950: Oliver Stanley
- 1951–1971: Robert Gascoyne-Cecil, 5th Marquess of Salisbury
- 1972–1979: Sir Kenneth Clinton Wheare
- 1980–1993: Philip Lever, 3rd Viscount Leverhulme
- 1994–1995: Alastair Pilkington
- 1996–2009: David Owen, Baron Owen
- 2010–2013: Sir David King
- 2017–2022: Colm Tóibín
- 2023–present: Wendy Beetlestone

The professional head of the university is the vice-chancellor. The following have served in that role:

- 1903–1919: A W W Dale
- 1919–1926: John George Adami
- 1926–1927: Lionel Wilberforce (acting vice-chancellor)
- 1927–1936: Hector Hetherington
- 1936–1937: John Leofric Stocks
- 1937–1945: Arnold McNair, 1st Baron McNair
- 1945–1963: Sir James Frederick Mountford
- 1963–1969: Winston Herbert Frederick Barnes
- 1969–1976: T C Thomas
- 1977–1984: R.F. Whelan
- 1986–1991: Graeme Davies
- 1992–2002: Philip Love
- 2002–2008: Sir Drummond Bone
- 2008–2014: Sir Howard Newby
- 2015–2022: Dame Janet Beer
- 2023–present: Tim Jones

=== Faculties ===
Since 2009, teaching departments of the university have been divided into three faculties: Health and Life Sciences, Humanities and Social Sciences and Science and Engineering. Each faculty is headed by a Pro-Vice-Chancellor, who is responsible for all schools in the faculty.

Faculty of Health and Life Sciences

- School of Dentistry
- School of Health Sciences
- School of Biosciences
- School of Medicine
- School of Psychology
- School of Veterinary Science

Faculty of Humanities and Social Sciences

- School of the Arts
  - Architecture
- School of Histories, Languages and Cultures
  - Archaeology, Classics and Egyptology
- School of Law and Social Justice
- University of Liverpool Management School

Faculty of Science and Engineering

- School of Computer Science and Informatics
- School of Engineering
- School of Environmental Sciences
- School of Physical Sciences

=== Finances ===
In the financial year ending 31 July 2024, the University of Liverpool had a total income of £705.3 million (2022/23 – £673.2 million) and total expenditure of £515.8 million (2022/23 – £662.5 million). Key sources of income included £367.1 million from tuition fees and education contracts (2022/23 – £342.5 million), £93.4 million from funding body grants (2022/23 – £94.6 million), £123.3 million from research grants and contracts (2022/23 – £118 million) and £22.7 million from endowment and investment income (2022/23 – £15.6 million).

At year end, Liverpool had endowments of £193.8 million (2023 – £182.7 million) and total net assets of £885.6 million (2023 – £679.8 million). It holds the ninth-largest endowment of any university in the UK.

== Academic profile ==
=== Admissions ===
UCAS Admission Statistics
	2025	2024	2023	2022	2021
Applications (Note: Main scheme applications, International and UK)	49,200	43,365	43,975	43,435	42,255
Accepted	8,575	7,310	6,515	5,910	6,630
Applications/Accepted Ratio	5.7	5.9	6.7	7.3	6.4
Overall Offer Rate (%)	72.3	71.0	69.7	67.8	71.2
↳ UK only (%) (Note: UK domiciled applicants)	73.7	72.7	71.8	69.1	72.1
Average Entry Tariff	—N/a	—N/a	137	150	147
↳ Top three exams (Note: The maximum tariff score for three exams is 168: the equivalent of A*A*A* at A-Level, 777 at HL for the IB Diploma Programme, or AAA at Advanced Higher)	—N/a	—N/a	133.7	142.6	140.5

HESA Student Body Composition (2024/25)
Domicile and Ethnicity	Total
British White (Note: Not be confused solely with White British)	58%
British Ethnic Minorities (Note: Includes those who indicate that they identify as Asian, Black, Mixed Heritage, Arab or any other ethnicity except White.)	18%
International EU	1%
International Non-EU	23%
Undergraduate Widening Participation Indicators
Female	57%
Independent School	11%
Low Participation Areas (Note: Calculated from the Polar4 measure, using Quintile1, in England and Wales. Calculated from the Scottish Index of Multiple Deprivation (SIMD) measure, using SIMD20, in Scotland.)	5%

In the 2024/25 academic year, the student body consisted of 31,050 students, composed of 23,490 undergraduates and 7,560 postgraduate students. The university is consistently designated as a 'high-tariff' institution by the Department for Education, with the average undergraduate entrant to the university in recent years amassing between 133–143 UCAS Tariff points in their top three pre-university qualifications – the equivalent of AAB to AAA at A-Level. Based on 2022/23 HESA entry standards data published in domestic league tables, which include a broad range of qualifications beyond the top three exam grades, the average student at the University of Liverpool achieved 150 points. The university gives offers of admission to 83.1% of its applicants, the 7th highest amongst the Russell Group.

According to the 2017 Times and Sunday Times Good University Guide, approximately 12% of Liverpool's undergraduates come from independent schools. In the 2016–17 academic year, the university had a domicile breakdown of 72:3:25 of UK:EU:non-EU students respectively with a female to male ratio of 55:45.

=== Rankings and reputation ===
Rankings
National rankings
- Complete (2027): 22
- Guardian (2027): 30
- Times / Sunday Times (2027): 21

Global rankings
- ARWU (2026): 151–200
- QS (2027): 139
- THE (2026): 143

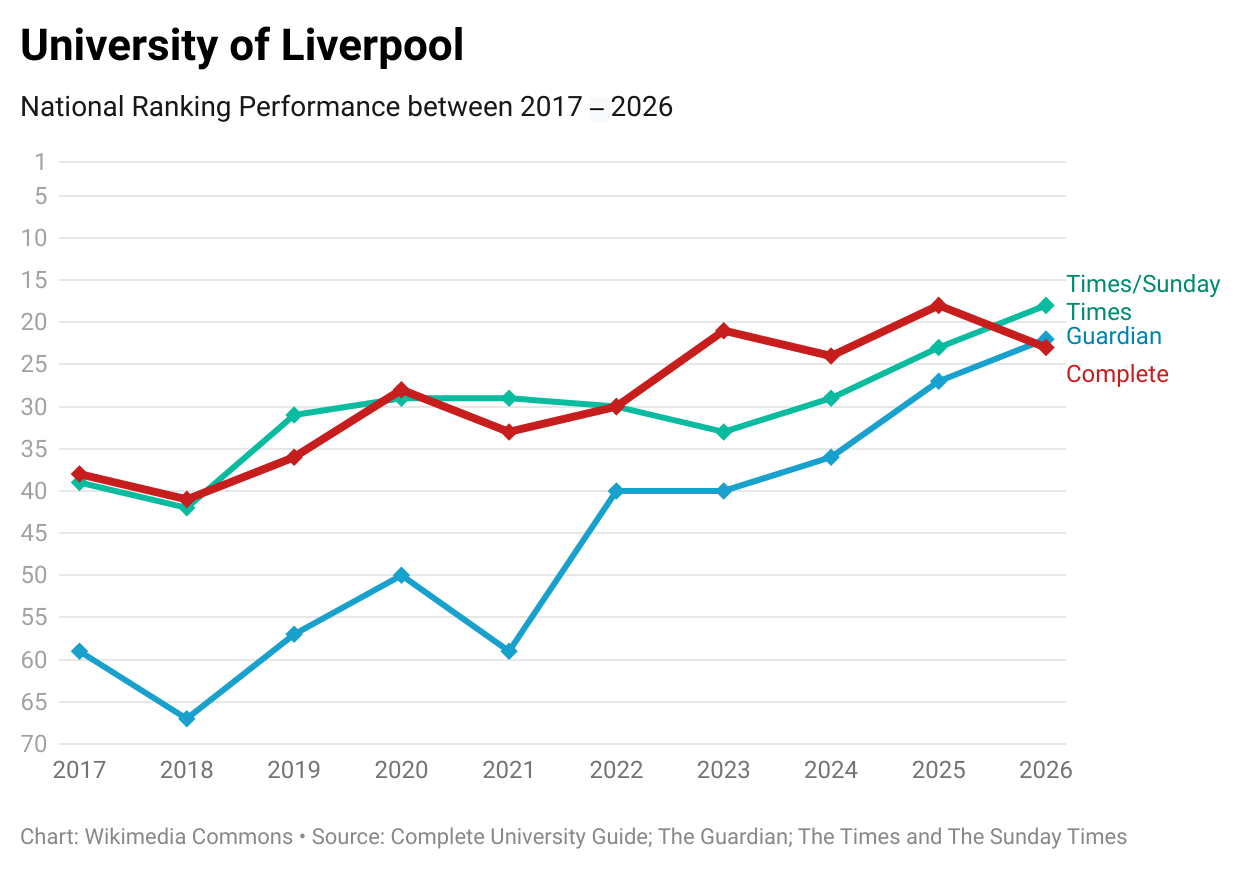
University of Liverpool's national league table performance over the past ten years

The university is ranked in the top 1% of universities worldwide according to Academic ranking of world universities and has previously been ranked within the top 150 university globally by the guide. It is also a founding member of the Russell Group and a founding member of the Northern Consortium.

In the Complete University Guide 2013, published in The Independent, the University of Liverpool was ranked 31st out of 124, based on nine measures, while The Times Good University Guide 2008 ranked Liverpool 34th out of 113 universities. The Sunday Times university guide recently ranked the University of Liverpool 27th out of 123. In 2010, The Sunday Times has ranked University of Liverpool 29th of 122 institutions nationwide. In 2008 the THE-QS World University Rankings rated University of Liverpool 99th best in the world, and 137th best worldwide in 2009. In 2011 the QS World University Rankings ranked the university in 123rd place, up 14. In the Times Good University Guide 2013, the University of Liverpool was ranked 29th. Liverpool is ranked 122nd in the world (and 15th in the UK) in the 2016 Round University Ranking.

The 2018 U.S. News & World Report ranks Liverpool 129th in the world. In 2019, it ranked 178th among the universities around the world by SCImago Institutions Rankings.

In the 2021 Research Excellence Framework (REF), which assesses the quality of research in UK higher education institutions, Liverpool is ranked joint 25th by GPA (along with Durham University and the University of Nottingham) and 19th for research power (the grade point average score of a university, multiplied by the full-time equivalent number of researchers submitted). The Research Excellence Framework for 2014 has confirmed the University of Liverpool's reputation for internationally outstanding research. Chemistry, Computer Science, General Engineering, Archaeology, Agriculture, Veterinary & Food Science, Architecture, Clinical Medicine, and English, are ranked in the top 10 in the UK for research excellence rated as 4* (world-leading) or 3* (internationally excellent), and also performed particularly well in terms of the impact of their research. The Computer Science department was ranked 1st in UK for 4* and 3* research, with 97% of the research being rated as world-leading or internationally excellent – the highest proportion of any computer science department in the UK. The Chemistry department was also ranked 1st in the UK with 99% of its research rated as 4* world leading or 3* internationally excellent

=== Xi'an Jiaotong-Liverpool University ===
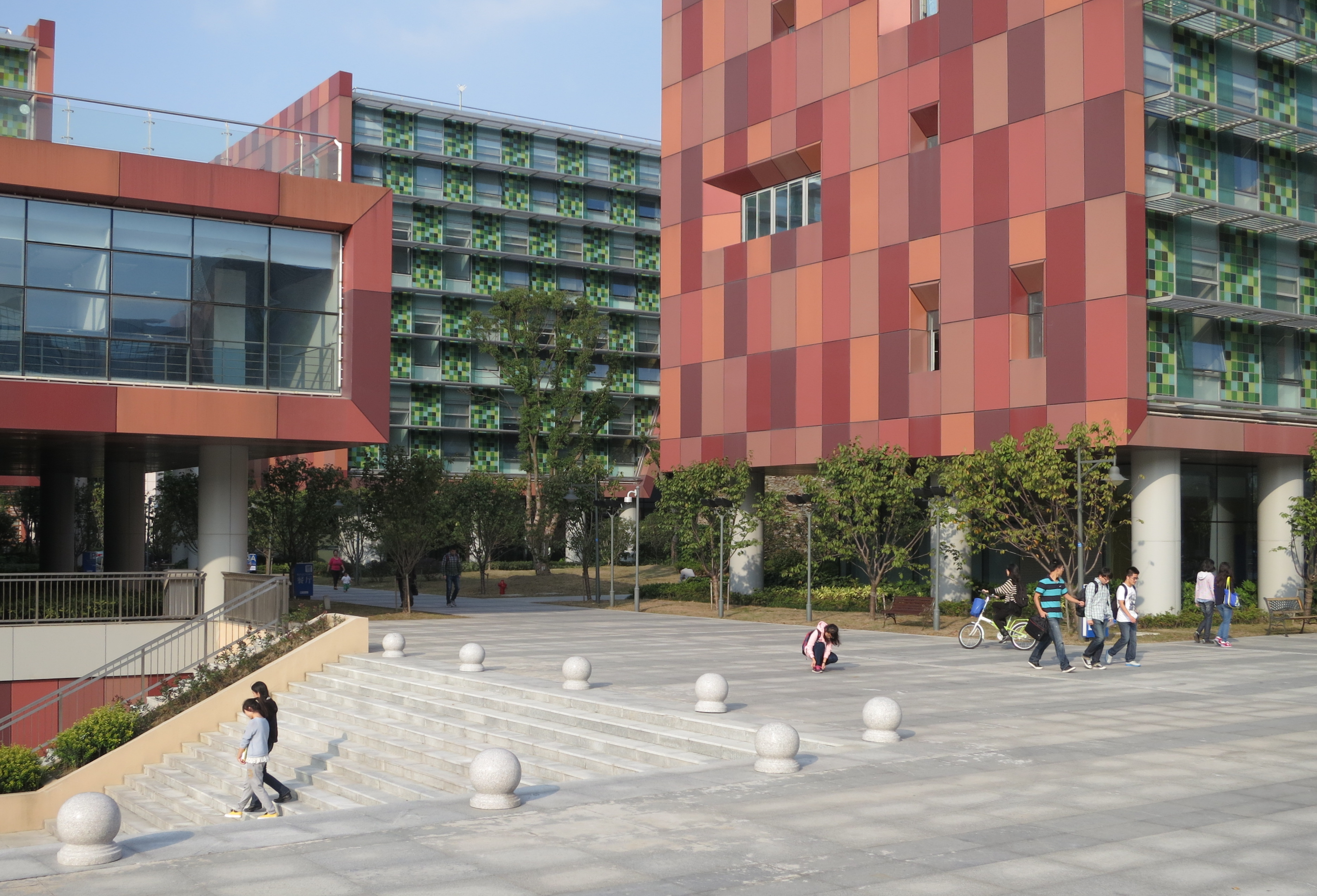
North Campus, Xi'an Jiaotong-Liverpool University; architects: Perkins&Will

In 2006 the university became the first in the UK to establish an independent university in China, making it the world's first Sino-British university. Resulting from a partnership between the University of Liverpool and Xi'an Jiaotong University, Xi'an Jiaotong–Liverpool University is the first Sino-British university between research-led universities, exploring new educational models for China.

The campus is situated in Suzhou Industrial Park in the eastern part of Suzhou in the province of Jiangsu, 90 km (56 mi) west of Shanghai. It is a science and engineering university with a second focus in English, recognised by the Chinese Ministry of Education as a "not-for-profit" educational institution. The university offers undergraduate degree programmes in the fields of Science, Engineering, and Management. Students are rewarded with a University of Liverpool degree as well as a degree from XJTLU. The teaching language is English.

== Student life ==
=== University halls ===
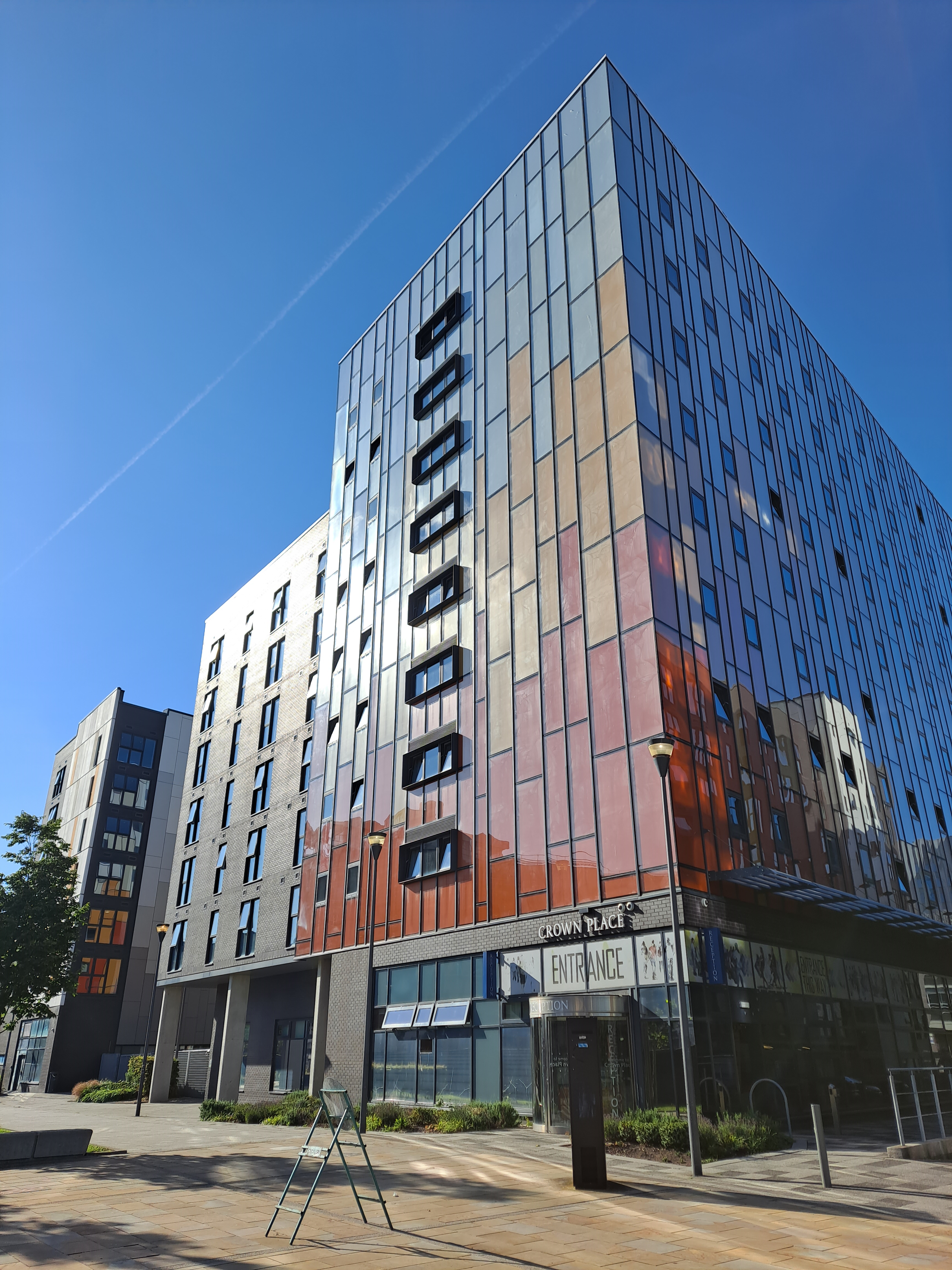
Crown Place halls of residence.

The university offers a range of on- and off-campus accommodations. As part of a £660 million investment in campus facilities and student experience, the university has built three new on-campus halls, while refurbishing existing accommodations. For 2025/2026, available accommodations are listed below:

On-campus

- Crown Place
- Philharmonic Court
- Vine Court
- Dover Court
- Tudor Close
- Melville Grove

Off-campus

- Greenbank Student Village
- Derby
- Roscoe
- Derby Old Court

In 2018, the university faced strong criticism from the student body that the university provided too expensive halls by the Cut the Rent campaign.

Privately accommodation owned Apollo Court ranked 3rd and Myrtle Court ranked 4th in the UK for value for money on a university review platform StudentCrowd.

In 2021, "Gladstone Halls" was renamed after leading communist and anti-racist leader Dorothy Kuya.

=== Sport ===
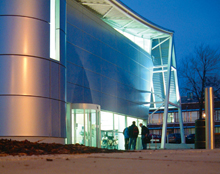
University of Liverpool's Sports Centre

The University of Liverpool has a sporting tradition and has many premier teams in a variety of sports. The current sporting project comes under the title of Sport Liverpool and offers over 50 different sports ranging from football, rugby, cricket and hockey to others such as windsurfing, lacrosse, and cheerleading.

Many of the sports have both male and female teams and most are involved in competition on a national level. BUCS is the body that organises national university competitions involving 154 institutions in 47 sports. Most sports involve travelling to various locations across the country, mainly on Wednesday afternoons.

Two other prominent competitions are the Christie Championships and the Varsity Cup. The Christie Cup is an inter-university competition between Liverpool, Leeds and Manchester's universities. (Note: Second oldest inter-university competition in England, fourth oldest in the United Kingdom and one of the oldest in the world.The Scottish Varsity match in rugby union between the University of St Andrews and the University of Edinburgh dates to the 1860s. The Scottish Boat Race between the University of Glasgow and the University of Edinburgh was first held in 1877. In the United States, the Harvard–Yale Regatta dates back to 1852. The 1869 Princeton vs. Rutgers football game was the first intercollegiate football (soccer) game in the U.S. while the first intercollegiate rugby football game took place in 1874 when Harvard University played McGill University.) The Varsity Cup is a popular "derby" event between the University of Liverpool and the Liverpool John Moores University.

== Notable alumni ==
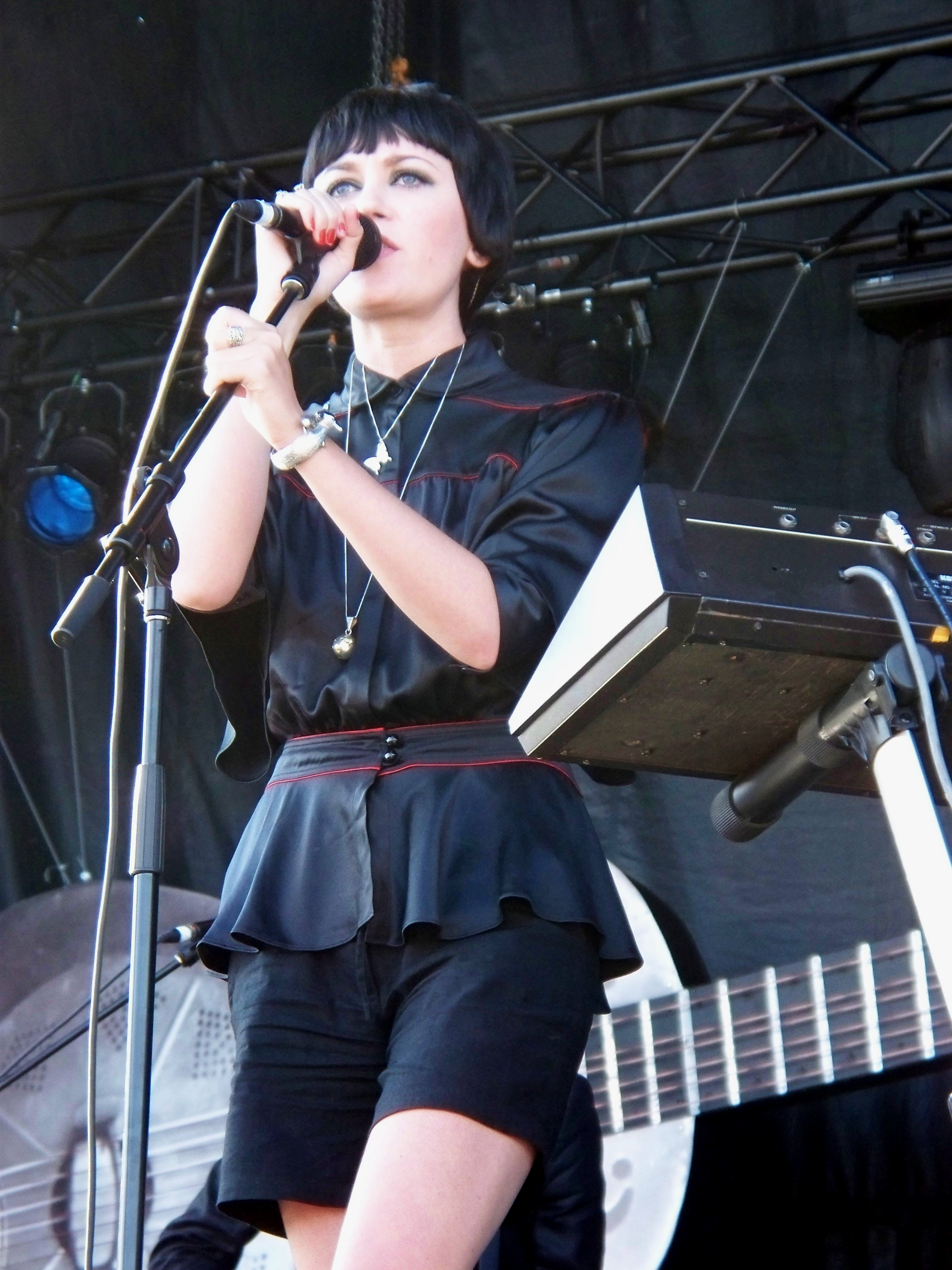
Helen Marnie, Scottish musician, Ladytron's vocalist

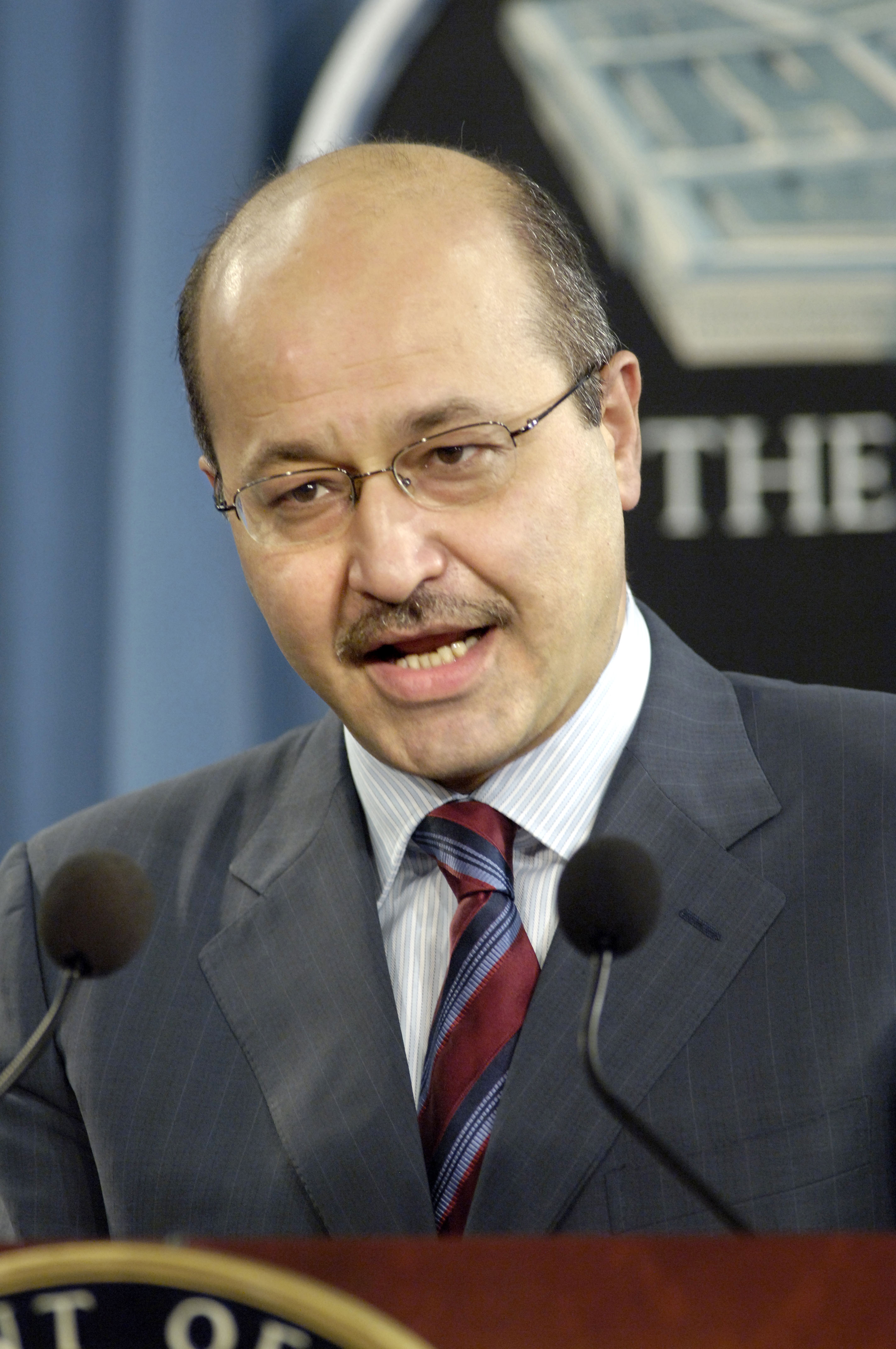
Barham Salih, 8th president of Iraq

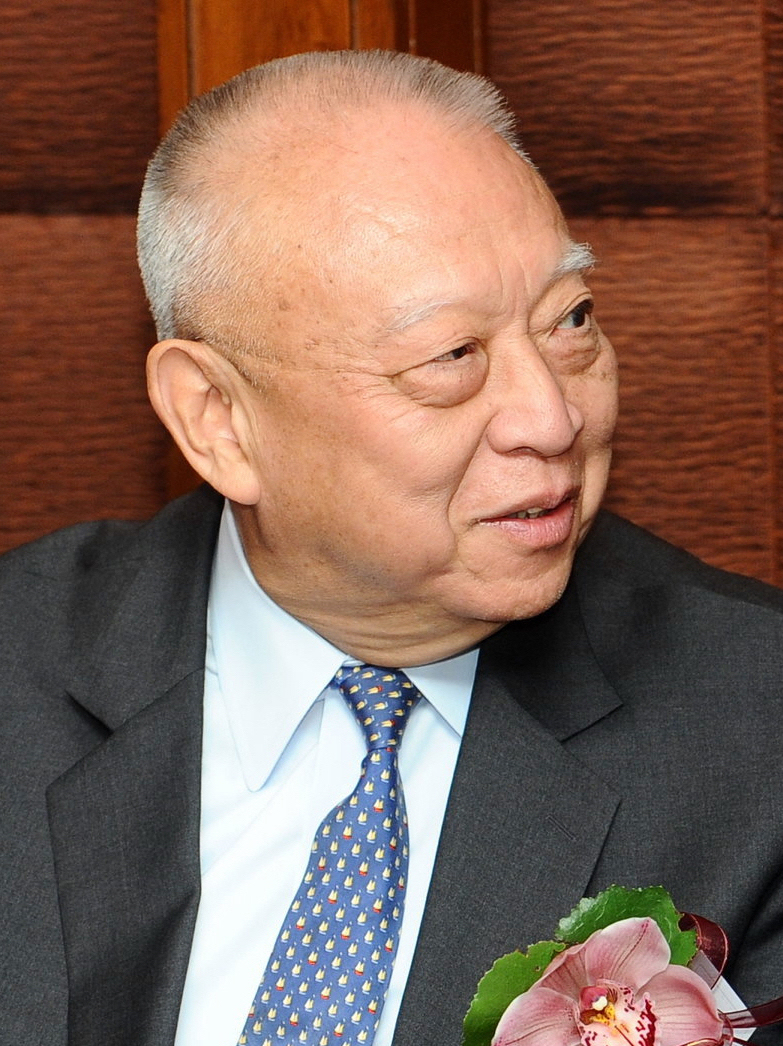
Tung Chee-hwa, first chief executive of the Hong Kong Special Administrative Region

- Gwen Alston, aerodynamicist and educationalist
- Clive Barker, fantasy and horror fiction writer and film director
- Wade Barrett, professional wrestler
- Hossein Bashiriyeh, Iranian professor of political science
- Stephen Bayley
- Torben Betts, playwright
- Roger Bolton, broadcaster and television producer
- George Henry Bolsover Director, School of Slavonic and East European Studies, London, 1947–76
- John Brophy, soldier and author
- Dariush Borbor, Iranian architect, urban planner, civic designer, writer
- Daasebre Oti Boateng, Ghanaian statistician, 1st black chairman of the United Nations Statistical Commission
- Paula Byrne, biographer
- Mary Cannell, educator, historian and biographer
- George Checkley, modernist architect
- Ong Teng Cheong, 5th President of Singapore
- Philip Clarke, CEO Tesco PLC
- Sir Stephen Cobb, Lord Justice of Appeal
- Steve Coppell, footballer and manager
- Alexander Critchley, MP for Liverpool Edge Hill 1893–1943
- Frances Crook, Chief Executive of the Howard League for Penal Reform
- Victoria Derbyshire, journalist and newsreader
- Irene Desmet, paediatric surgeon
- Frank Duckworth, statistician, developed the Duckworth–Lewis method
- Carol Ann Duffy, Poet Laureate
- Peter Dunphy, film producer, politician and Chief Commoner of the City of London
- Colum Eastwood, Northern Irish politician and SDLP leader
- Steve Firth, musician
- Maxwell Fry, modernist architect
- Ernest Gibbins, dipterist
- Mary Gibby, botanist and professor
- Simon Gilbert, journalist and author
- Rob Grant
- Nick Grimshaw
- Brian Hall, footballer
- Rose Heilbron, barrister and judge
- George Noel Hill, City Architect
- William Holford, Baron Holford, architect and town planner
- John Holt, physicist
- Barry Horne, journalist and pundit
- Beverley Hughes, former Member of Parliament (MP)
- Robert Roland Hughes, pioneer in neuroscience and electroencephalography
- Irshad Hussain, chemist and materials scientist
- Frank Irving, aeronautical engineer, glider pilot and author
- Sir Dawda Kairaba Jawara, first President and Prime Minister of The Gambia
- Rory Jennings, actor
- Sanjay Jha, Motorola, Inc. Co-CEO and Motorola's Mobile Devices business CEO
- Syed Kamall
- Alfredo Kanthack, pathologist
- Brian Keaney, children's author
- Sir Frank Kermode, literary critic
- Sir Ian Kershaw, historian
- Peter Kilfoyle
- Robert Legget, civil engineer, historian, and non-fiction writer
- Sir Leigh Lewis, permanent secretary
- Ann Limb, Baroness Limb, Labour peer who lied about having a PhD from the university
- William Lindesay English conservationist
- Oliver W F Lodge
- Chris Lowe, musician
- Diarmaid MacCulloch, historian
- Emma Mbua, palaeo-anthropologist
- Alden McLaughlin, Premier of the Cayman Islands
- Rex Makin, solicitor and philanthropist
- Helen Marnie, member of the band Ladytron
- Anna Maxwell Martin, actor
- Rod I. McAllister, architect
- Tony McNulty, Labour Minister
- Brian Millard, leader of Stockport Metropolitan Borough Council from 2005 to 2007
- Ben Mosley, expressive artist
- Margaret Murphy, crime writer
- Doug Naylor, co-creator of Red Dwarf
- Sir John Neale, historian of Tudor England
- Ernest Newman, music critic and biographer of Wagner
- Lord Nicholls, retired Law Lord
- Charlotte Nichols, Labour MP for Warrington North 2019–
- Paddy Nixon, Vice-Chancellor & President of the University of Canberra
- Gordon Oakes
- Stel Pavlou, author and screenwriter
- David Andrew Phoenix, biochemist
- Dee Plume and Sue Denim, musicians from the band Robots in Disguise
- Ceri Powell, geologist and senior Royal Dutch Shell executive
- John Preston (1950–2017), music industry executive
- James Quincey, The Coca-Cola Company's CEO
- Phil Redmond, television producer
- Sir Leonard Redshaw, shipbuilder
- Gordon Jackson Rees, paediatric anaesthesiologist
- Aki Riihilahti, former football player and current football executive
- Wolfgang Rindler, physicist
- Dame Stella Rimington, Director-General of MI5
- Roy Roberts, actor
- Winifred Robinson, broadcaster
- Michael Rosen, children's writer
- Patricia Routledge, actress
- Barham Ahmad Salih, 8th President of Iraq
- Sir Robin Saxby, former chairman of ARM Holdings
- Maeve Sherlock, social reformer and life peer
- Margaret Simey, social and political campaigner
- F.E. Smith, 1st Earl of Birkenhead
- Martin Smith, vehicle designer
- Jon Snow, Channel 4 television news presenter
- Edward Snowden, system administrator and counterintelligence trainer
- Olaf Stapledon, novelist and philosopher
- Sir James Stirling, architect
- Lytton Strachey, biographer and essayist
- Edward Stringer, Deputy Chief Defence, Royal Air Force
- Matt Taylor, project scientist for the Rosetta mission
- Heidi Thomas, screenwriter and playwright
- Sir Michael Thompson, academic
- Tung Chee-hwa, first chief executive of the Hong Kong Special Administrative Region, businessman
- Emma Jane Unsworth, writer
- Steve Voake, children's author
- Lee Bee Wah, politician
- Baroness Walmsley, politician
- Helen Walsh, novelist
- Sid Watkins, former Formula 1 chief medical officer
- Emma Watkinson, entrepreneur
- Sir David Weatherall, Regius Professor of Medicine, 1992–2000
- Jim Woodcock, professor of software engineering
- Verna Wright, evangelist, physician and research scientist
- Warrington Yorke, Professor of Tropical Medicine, University of Liverpool

=== Nobel Prize winners ===
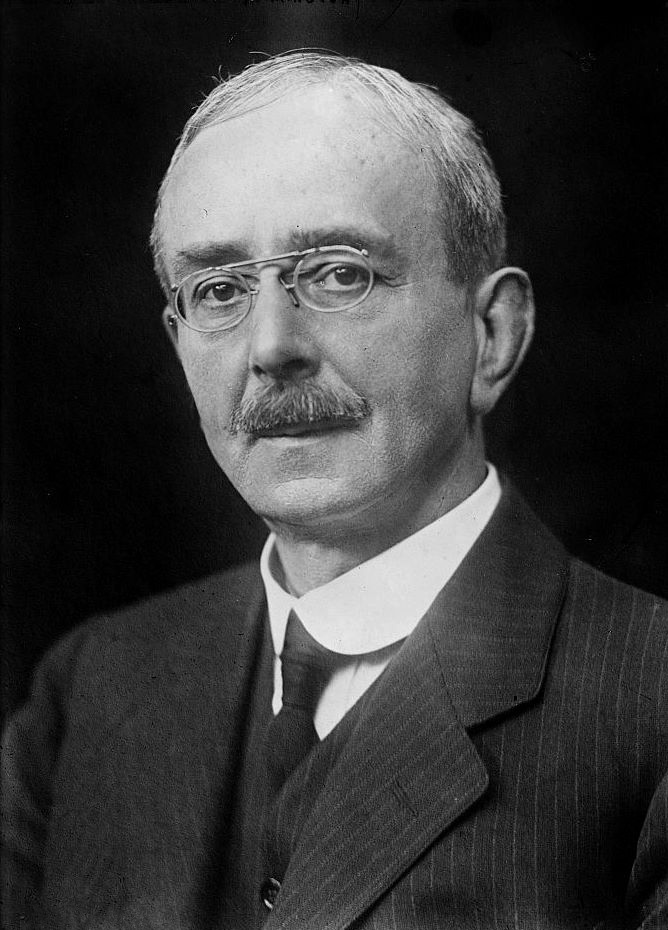
Charles Scott Sherrington

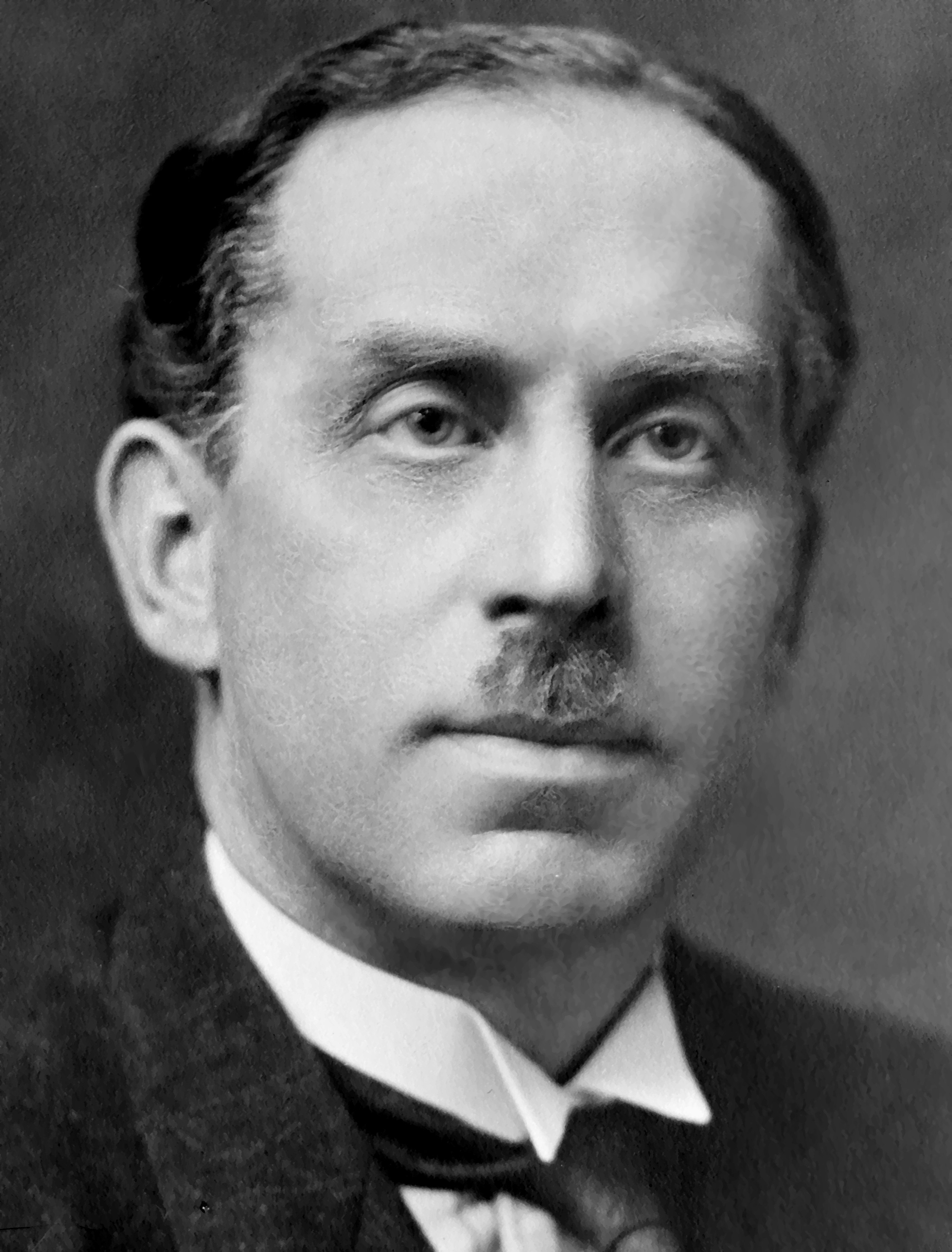
Charles Glover Barkla

There have been ten Nobel Prize Laureates who have been based at the university during a significant period in their career.

Laureate	Field	Year	Achievement
Sir Ronald Ross	Medicine	1902	His work with malaria
Charles Barkla	Physics	1917	Discovering the electromagnetic properties of X-rays
Sir Charles Sherrington	Physiology/Medicine	1932	His research into neurons
Sir James Chadwick	Physics	1935	Discovering neutrons
Sir Robert Robinson	Chemistry	1947	His research into anthocyanins and alkaloids
Har Gobind Khorana	Physiology/Medicine	1968	His work on the interpretation of the genetic code and its function in protein synthesis
Rodney Porter	Physiology/Medicine	1972	His discovery of the structure of antibodies
Ronald Coase	Economics	1991	His discovery and clarification of the significance of transaction costs and property rights for the institutional structure and functioning of the economy
Joseph Rotblat	Peace	1995	His efforts with nuclear disarmament
Martin Lewis Perl	Physics	1995	His discovery of the tau lepton

== See also ==
- List of modern universities in Europe (1801–1945)
- Liverpool Knowledge Quarter
- Liverpool Life Sciences UTC
- Liverpool School of Tropical Medicine
- Truman Bodden Law School
- University of Liverpool Mathematics School
- Yoko Ono Lennon Centre
