= Elstree Screen Arts Academy =

Coordinates: 51.6605°N 0.2610°W

Location
- Studio Way; Borehamwood, Hertfordshire, WD6 5NN; England

Information
- Type: University Technical College
- Established: September 2013
- Founder: The University of Hertfordshire, The Meller Educational Trust, Elstree Studios
- Department for Education URN: 139416 Tables
- Ofsted: Reports
- Chairman of Governors: Lewis Barton
- Principal: Chris Mitchell
- Gender: Mixed
- Age: 14 to 19
- Enrolment: 474
- Capacity: 600
- Colours: Black & White
- Trusts: Danes Educational Trust; Baker Dearing Trust
- Website: academy.elstreescreenarts.com

Elstree Screen Arts Academy (formerly Elstree University Technical College) is a university technical college (UTC) located in Borehamwood, Hertfordshire, England, which opened in September 2013. The UTC specialises in behind-the-scenes media production, digital communications and entertainment technologies with a curriculum that is designed to ensure strong foundations in fundamental academic subjects and build on these with vocational, expressive and industry relevant studies.

The school's lead sponsor is the University of Hertfordshire; other sponsors include Elstree Studios. It occupies newly developed buildings on Studio Way. The conversion was designed by Ellis Williams Architects and was undertaken by Willmott Dixon Interiors.

== Educational vision ==
Elstree Screen Arts Academy offers full-time technically orientated courses to 600 students aged 14–19. A range of courses have a focus on technical skills, trades, crafts and technologies that support the entertainment, film, television, theatre, visual arts and digital communication industries.

== Partners ==
Elstree Screen Arts Academy is supported by employers such as Elstree Studios, BBC, Apples & Snakes, MOBO Awards and Apps for Good and is supported by Skillset, Hertfordshire County Council, Hertsmere Borough Council, Hertfordshire Chamber of Commerce & Industry, The Watford UTC, The Grange Academy, The Harefield Academy and Hertswood Academy.

== Performance ==
Ofsted first inspected the school, then named Elstree UTC, in May 2015, where it was given a rating of 'requires improvement' in all categories. The school was inspected again in May 2017 and given an overall grading of 'requires improvement', although it was assessed as 'good' for 'effectiveness of leadership and management' and 'personal development, behaviour and welfare'. At that time, 332 students were enrolled. In September 2019, Ofsted inspected the school for the third time and gave it an overall grading of 'good'.

In January 2025, Ofsted inspected the school, now renamed Elstree Screen Arts, where it was given a rating of 'outstanding' in all categories. Principal Chris Mitchell stated that the staff were "majorly chuffed" following the judgement.
