= Aston University Mathematics School =

Specialist maths school in Birmingham, England

Location
- 2 Lister Street; Birmingham, West Midlands, B7 4AG; England; 52.4860°N 1.8870°W

Information
- Type: Maths school (free school 16–19)
- Established: 1 September 2025
- Local authority: Birmingham
- Department for Education URN: 151725 Tables
- CEO of Trust: Daniel Locke-Wheaton
- Principal: Francis Goodburn
- Gender: Mixed
- Age: 16 to 19
- Website: aums.ac.uk

Aston University Mathematics School (AUMS) is a maths school in Birmingham, England. It is a state-funded, selective free school sixth form college for students aged 16 to 19, specialising in mathematics and related subjects. The school is sponsored by Aston University and operated by the Aston University STEM Education Academy Trust, a multi-academy trust that also includes the Aston University Engineering Academy.

AUMS opened on 1 September 2025. It is one of eleven maths schools established under a government programme to create a specialist mathematics sixth form in every region of England, and the only one in the West Midlands. It was the ninth maths school to become operational.

== History ==
=== Establishment ===
In March 2024, the Department for Education announced that Aston University had been selected to establish the maths school for the West Midlands, as part of the government's commitment to have one in each region of England. Aston was chosen on the basis of its expertise in applied mathematics, computer science and digital technologies. The school had originally listed September 2024 as its proposed opening date, but was delayed by one year owing to difficulties in securing a permanent site, a problem that affected several schools in the maths school programme.

In October 2024, Aston University received approval to establish the Aston University STEM Education Academy Trust, a multi-academy trust bringing together AUMS, the Aston University Engineering Academy (a university technical college), and the Goldsmiths' Institute.

=== Opening ===
AUMS opened on 1 September 2025, admitting an initial cohort of 75 students. The University of Nottingham's Mathematics Education Observatory recorded it as the ninth maths school to open in England. At the time of opening, the Department for Education had paused plans for two further maths schools (in Durham and Nottingham), leaving AUMS as the most recently opened school in the programme. The school is registered with Ofsted under URN 151725 and had not yet been inspected as of March 2026.

== Location ==
The school is based at 2 Lister Street, adjacent to the Aston University campus in the Birmingham Innovation Quarter. The building previously housed the National College for Advanced Transport and Infrastructure, which was acquired by the university. The school is next door to the Aston University Engineering Academy at 1 Lister Street; both institutions are part of the same academy trust.

== Curriculum ==
As with all maths schools, students are required to study A-level Mathematics and A-level Further Mathematics. At AUMS, students also take a third A-level in either Physics or Computer Science, and a fourth A-level in the remaining subject or alternatively in Chemistry or Economics.

In addition to A-levels, students undertake group research projects with Aston University academics and the Extended Project Qualification (EPQ).

== Admissions ==
AUMS is academically selective, in common with all maths schools. Applicants sit a mathematics aptitude test and attend a mathematics-focused interview. Conditional offers are then made on the basis of GCSE results. Minimum entry requirements include grade 8 in GCSE Mathematics, grade 7 in GCSE Physics (or 7–7 in GCSE Combined Science), and grade 5 in GCSE English Language.

The school admitted 75 students in its first year and plans to increase capacity to approximately 150 students over subsequent years.

== Outreach ==
All maths schools are required to deliver outreach work with surrounding schools and colleges as part of their funding conditions. AUMS undertakes outreach with secondary schools across the West Midlands, with a focus on groups under-represented in mathematics, including students from disadvantaged backgrounds and girls.

A 2025 report by the University of Nottingham's Mathematics Education Observatory found that students who attended the first three maths schools achieved higher A-level grades and were more likely to progress to mathematics degrees at higher-tariff universities than comparable peers elsewhere.

== See also ==
- Maths school
- Aston University
- Aston University Engineering Academy
