= Kenneth Baker, Baron Baker of Dorking =

British politician (born 1934)

The Right Honourable The Lord Baker of Dorking CH PC
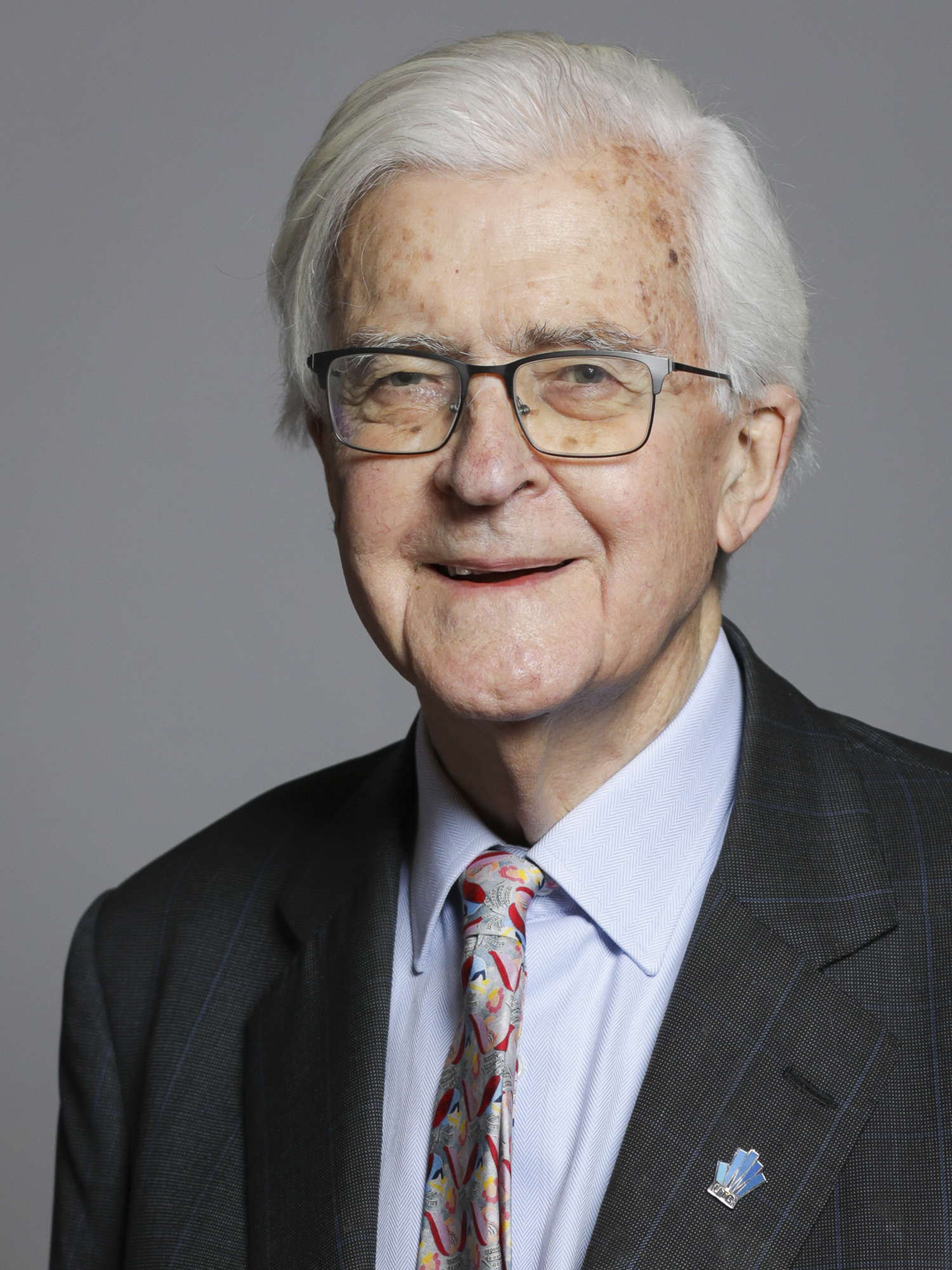
- Official portrait, 2020

Home Secretary
- In office 28 November 1990 – 10 April 1992
- Prime Minister: John Major
- Preceded by: David Waddington
- Succeeded by: Kenneth Clarke

Chancellor of the Duchy of Lancaster
- In office 24 July 1989 – 28 November 1990
- Prime Minister: Margaret Thatcher
- Preceded by: Tony Newton
- Succeeded by: Chris Patten

Chairman of the Conservative Party
- In office 24 July 1989 – 28 November 1990
- Leader: Margaret Thatcher
- Preceded by: Peter Brooke
- Succeeded by: Chris Patten

Secretary of State for Education and Science
- In office 21 May 1986 – 24 July 1989
- Prime Minister: Margaret Thatcher
- Preceded by: Keith Joseph
- Succeeded by: John MacGregor

Secretary of State for the Environment
- In office 2 September 1985 – 21 May 1986
- Prime Minister: Margaret Thatcher
- Preceded by: Patrick Jenkin
- Succeeded by: Nicholas Ridley
Junior ministerial offices 1981–1985
Minister of State for Local Government
In office 11 September 1984 – 1 September 1985
| Prime Minister | Margaret Thatcher |
| Sec. of State | Patrick Jenkin |
| Preceded by | The Lord Bellwin |
| Succeeded by | William Waldegrave |
Minister of State for Industry and Information Technology^{[a]}
In office 5 January 1981 – 10 September 1984
| Prime Minister | Margaret Thatcher |
| Sec. of State | Sir Keith Joseph; Patrick Jenkin; Cecil Parkinson; Norman Tebbit |
| Preceded by | The Viscount Trenchard |
| Succeeded by | Geoffrey Pattie |
Parliamentary Secretary for the Civil Service Department
In office 7 April 1972 – 4 March 1974 Serving with Geoff Johnson-Smith (1972–1974)
| Prime Minister | Edward Heath |
| Preceded by | David Howell |
| Succeeded by | Robert Sheldon |
Parliamentary offices
Member of the House of Lords
Lord Temporal
Life peerage 16 June 1997
Member of Parliament for Mole Valley
In office 9 June 1983 – 8 April 1997
| Preceded by | Constituency created |
| Succeeded by | Paul Beresford |
Member of Parliament for St Marylebone
In office 22 October 1970 – 13 May 1983
| Preceded by | Quintin Hogg |
| Succeeded by | Constituency abolished |
Member of Parliament for Acton
In office 28 March 1968 – 29 May 1970
| Preceded by | Bernard Floud |
| Succeeded by | Nigel Spearing |

Personal details
- Born: 3 November 1934 (age 91) Newport, Monmouthshire, Wales
- Party: Conservative
- Spouse: Mary Elizabeth Gray-Muir (m. 1963)
- Children: Oswin; Sophia; Amy
- Education: Magdalen College, Oxford (BA, MSc)
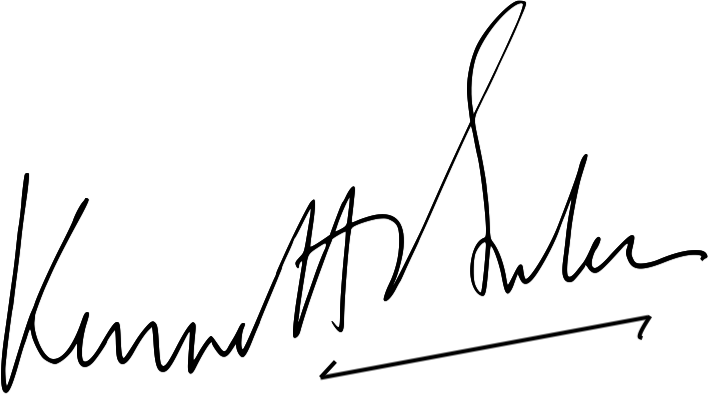
- Signature
- Website: Official website
- Kenneth Baker's voice Baker promotes career colleges for 14 to 19 year olds Recorded 10 June 2015
- a. Minister of State for Industry: 5 January 1981 to 12 June 1983

Kenneth Wilfred Baker, Baron Baker of Dorking (born 3 November 1934) is a British politician, Conservative Member of Parliament from 1968 to 1997, and a cabinet minister, including holding the offices of Home Secretary, Education Secretary and Chairman of the Conservative Party. He is a life member of the Tory Reform Group.

Baker stood down from the House of Commons at the 1997 election and was created a life peer as Baron Baker of Dorking, joining the House of Lords.

== Early life ==
The son of a civil servant, Baker was born in Newport, Monmouthshire. He was educated at Hampton Grammar School between 1946 and 1948, a boys' voluntary aided school in West London (now Hampton School, an independent school). He then went on to study at St Paul's School, and at Magdalen College, Oxford, where he graduated in 1958 with a BA Degree in History. Whilst at Oxford, Baker served as Secretary of The Oxford Union. Four years later he graduated with a MSc degree in International Law and Regulations. He did National Service in the Royal Artillery, reaching the rank of lieutenant, and worked for Royal Dutch Shell before being elected as a Member of Parliament at a by-election in March 1968.

== Career ==
=== Political career ===
==== Member of Parliament ====
Having unsuccessfully contested Poplar in 1964 and Acton in 1966, Baker was first elected to Parliament when he won Acton at a March 1968 by-election, gaining it from Labour following the suicide of Bernard Floud. However, at the 1970 general election he was defeated by Labour's Nigel Spearing. At an ensuing by-election, held on 22 October 1970—caused by the elevation to the Lords (as a life peer) of Quintin Hogg, so that he could become Lord Chancellor following the surprise Conservative victory at the 1970 election—Baker was elected for the safe Conservative seat of St Marylebone in central London. In the parliamentary seat redistribution of the early 1980s, St Marylebone was abolished and Baker was defeated by Peter Brooke for the Conservative nomination at the nearby new safe seat of Cities of London & Westminster. However he successfully obtained nomination at Mole Valley, a safely-Conservative rural seat in Surrey, which he held until his retirement in 1997. He was succeeded there by Sir Paul Beresford.

==== Early ministerial career ====
Baker's first government post was in the Heath ministry; in 1972 he became Parliamentary Secretary at the Civil Service Department, and in 1974 parliamentary private secretary to Edward Heath. Having become closely associated with Heath, he was overlooked for office when Margaret Thatcher became Prime Minister in 1979, but in 1981 he was appointed Minister for Information Technology, in the then Department of Trade and Industry. Having been sworn of the Privy Council in the 1984 New Year Honours, he entered the Cabinet as Secretary of State for the Environment in 1985.

==== Education Secretary ====
Baker served as Secretary of State for Education from 1986 to 1989. His most noted action in his time at the Department of Education was the introduction of the controversial "national curriculum" through the 1988 Education Act. He also introduced in-service training days for teachers, which became popularly known as "Baker days". At this time Baker was often tipped as a future Conservative leader, including in the 1987 edition of Julian Critchley's biography of Michael Heseltine. Critchley quoted one journalist's witticism "I have seen the future and it smirks" (a reference to the famous line "I have seen the future and it works" written by Lincoln Steffens, an American visitor to Lenin's USSR in 1921). Baker's mannerisms were unpopular with some people: he dressed his hair with Brylcreem, and by the late 1980s he had come to be portrayed by the satirical programme Spitting Image as a slimy slug.

==== Party Chairman ====
In the July 1989 reshuffle Baker was appointed Chairman of the Conservative Party, with the intention that he should organise a fourth consecutive General Election victory for Margaret Thatcher. He managed to steer the government through the otherwise disastrous local elections of May 1990 by stressing the good results for Conservative "flagship" councils in Westminster and Wandsworth, i.e. supposedly demonstrating that the poll tax—a source of great unpopularity for the government—could be a vote-winner for Conservative councils who kept it low. He was still Party Chairman at the time Margaret Thatcher resigned in November 1990.

==== Home Secretary ====
Following the change of regime, Baker was promoted to Home Secretary, dealing with prison riots and introducing the Dangerous Dogs Act.

After his term of office, Baker was found (M v Home Office 1994) to have been in contempt of court for having deported a man back to Zaire in 1991, in breach of an interim injunction and while proceedings were pending. "It would be a black day for the rule of law and the liberty of the subject", the Court of Appeal ruled, "if ministers were not accountable to the courts for their personal actions." This was the first time the courts had reached such a finding against a minister for exercise of Prerogative Powers, something previously thought to be impossible.

==== After 1992 ====
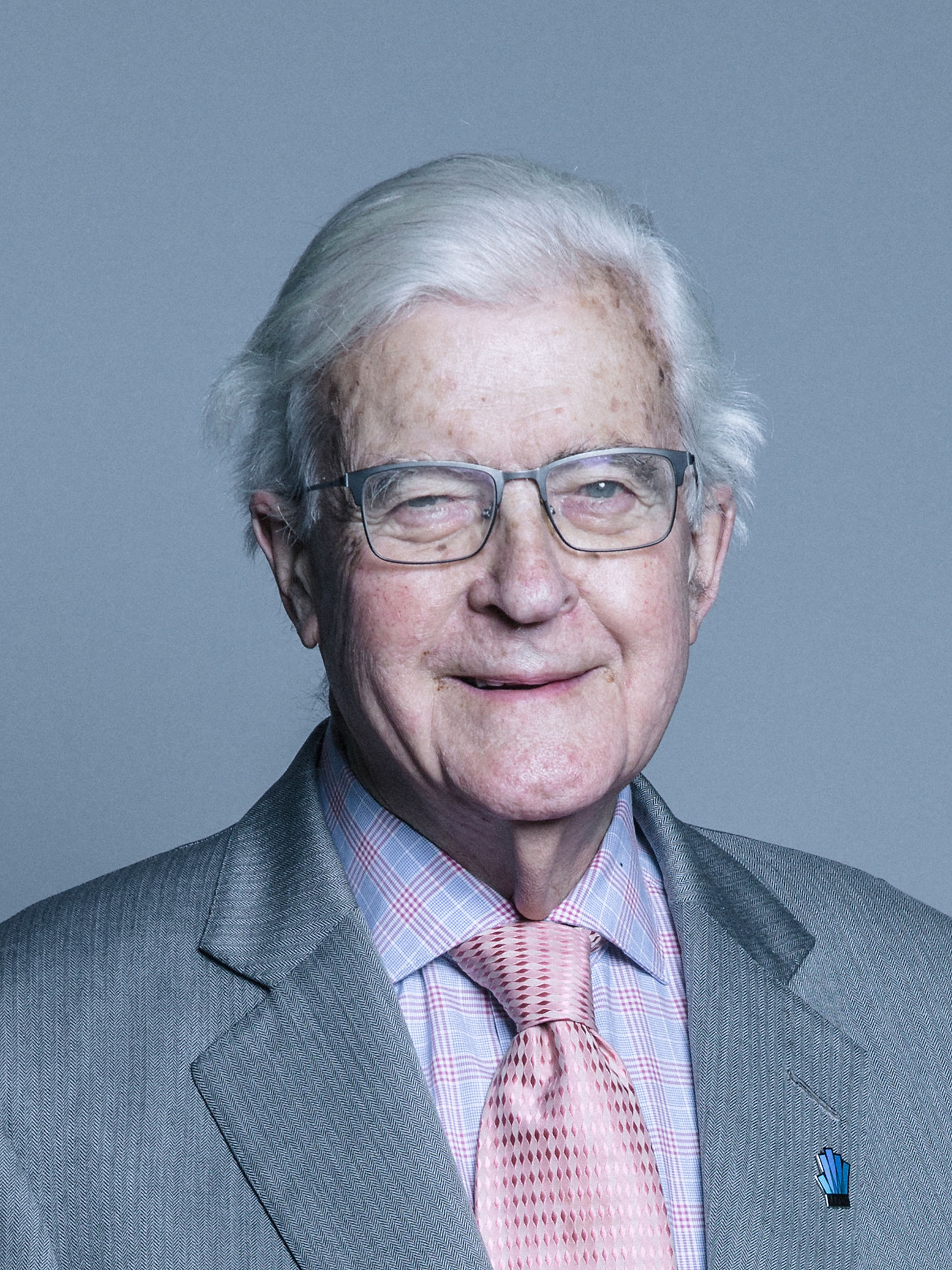
Baker in 2018

Following the 1992 general election Baker left the government rather than accept demotion to the job of Welsh Secretary. He was appointed a member of the Order of the Companions of Honour (CH) on 13 April 1992. He proposed the Loyal Address in the Queen's Speech debate on 6 May 1992, following the general election. He chose not to stand for re-election to the House of Commons in 1997, and on 16 June was created a life peer as Baron Baker of Dorking, of Iford in the County of East Sussex.

Baker was interviewed in 2012 as part of The History of Parliament's oral history project.

Since 2019, Baker has campaigned for the abolition of General Certificate of Secondary Education (GCSE) examinations, which he introduced as Secretary of State for Education. Baker believes the certificate to be redundant as it fails in creating skills wanted by employers, is incompatible with the new age 18 school-leaving age and causes poor mental health in the youth. When the annual GCSE examinations were cancelled twice during the COVID-19 pandemic, Baker believed there to be increasing opposition to their return and considered it a "great opportunity" to abolish them. Baker also criticised government plans to replace Business and Technology Education Council (BTEC) qualifications with T Levels as "vandalism", instead preferring to maintain the status quo where both BTECs and T-Levels are available to students.

In September 2019, Baker criticised attempts by Prime Minister Boris Johnson to deselect rebel Conservative MPs at the next general election.

== Baker Dearing Educational Trust ==
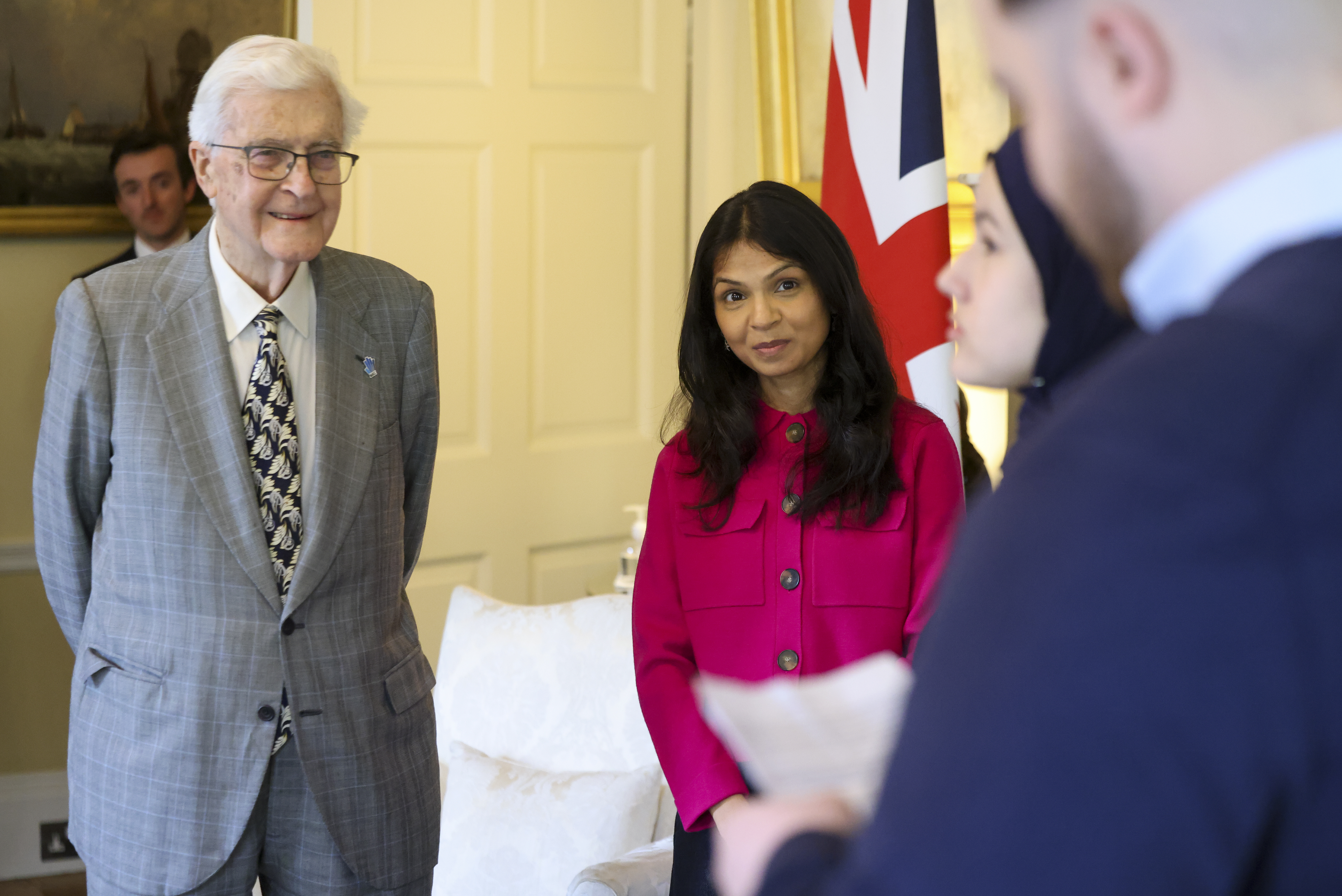
Baker (left) attends a meeting with Akshata Murty and representatives of the London Design and Engineering UTC, 2023.

Baker was co-founder along with the late Ronald Dearing of the Baker Dearing Educational Trust, an educational trust set up to promote the establishment of university technical colleges in England as part of the free school programme. He is also chair of the independent education charity Edge Foundation which campaigns for a coherent, unified and holistic education for all young people.

== Personal life ==
Until 1995 Baker lived in Station Road in the village of Betchworth, 4 miles (6.4 km) east of Dorking. He now lives in the hamlet of Iford near Lewes, East Sussex.

In 2005 he published a book on George IV, George IV: A Life in Caricature, followed by George III: A Life in Caricature in 2007 (Thames & Hudson). Other publications include several compilations of poetry, a history of political cartoons and his autobiography.

In 2006 Lord Baker announced that he was introducing a bill into the House of Lords to address the West Lothian question. This would prevent Scottish and Welsh MPs from voting on legislation which affects England alone as a result of devolution to the Scottish Parliament or the Welsh Assembly.

Baker's son, Oswin, is a leading member of the Greenwich and Woolwich Labour Party.

According to his entry in Who's Who, Baker enjoys collecting books and political caricatures.

== In the media ==
Baker was interviewed about the rise of Thatcherism for the 2006 BBC TV documentary series Tory! Tory! Tory!. Baker was portrayed as a slug in the political satire television show Spitting Image.

On 31 January 2023, Baker was invited on BBC Newsnight to comment on a forthcoming teachers' strike and on PM Rishi Sunak's management of his Cabinet appointments. At one point the presenter Victoria Derbyshire removed Baker's incessantly ringing mobile phone, which continually interrupted the latter part of the live studio interview, during which he quipped that the PM was insistent in attempting to reach him.

== Honours ==
In 1994 Lord Baker was awarded an honorary doctorate from Richmond American University London.

In 2013 he was awarded an honorary doctorate of Education from Plymouth University.

He was awarded an honorary doctorate of Education from Brunel University in 2016.

== Arms ==
Coat of arms of Kenneth Baker, Baron Baker of Dorking
| Crest Upon two closed books each fesswise the upper Azure the lower Gules both garnished and titled Or a cock also Or combed jelopped and legged Gules. Escutcheon Gyronny of eight Gules and Azure a roundel also Azure surmounted by an annulet enfiling the rings of the chains of three portcullises in pairle points inwards Or. Supporters On either side a male griffin reguardant Azure armed forelegged and rayed Or the dexter grasping in the beak a thistle flowered Gules slipped and leaved Or and the sinister a daffodil slipped and leaved Or. Motto Bene Tentare |

== Bibliography ==
- George IV: A Life in Caricature (2005 Thames & Hudson ISBN 0-500-25127-4)
- George III: A Life in Caricature (2007 Thames & Hudson ISBN 0-500-25140-1)
- 14–18 – A New Vision for Secondary Education (2013 Bloomsbury Academic ISBN 978-1780938448)

Parliament of the United Kingdom
| Preceded by Bernard Floud | Member of Parliament for Acton; 1968–1970 | Succeeded by Nigel Spearing |
| Preceded by Quintin Hogg | Member of Parliament for St Marylebone; 1970–1983 | Constituency abolished |
| New constituency | Member of Parliament for Mole Valley; 1983–1997 | Succeeded by Paul Beresford |
Political offices
| Preceded by Patrick Jenkin | Secretary of State for the Environment; 1985–1986 | Succeeded by Nicholas Ridley |
| Preceded by Keith Joseph | Secretary of State for Education and Science; 1986–1989 | Succeeded by John MacGregor |
| Preceded by Tony Newton | Chancellor of the Duchy of Lancaster; 1989–1990 | Succeeded by Chris Patten |
| Preceded by David Waddington | Secretary of State for the Home Department; 1990–1992 | Succeeded by Kenneth Clarke |
Party political offices
| Preceded by Peter Brooke | Chairman of the Conservative Party; 1989–1990 | Succeeded by Chris Patten |
Orders of precedence in the United Kingdom
| Preceded by The Lord Hurd of Westwell | Gentlemen; Baron Baker of Dorking | Followed by The Lord Patten |
