= Ron Dearing UTC =

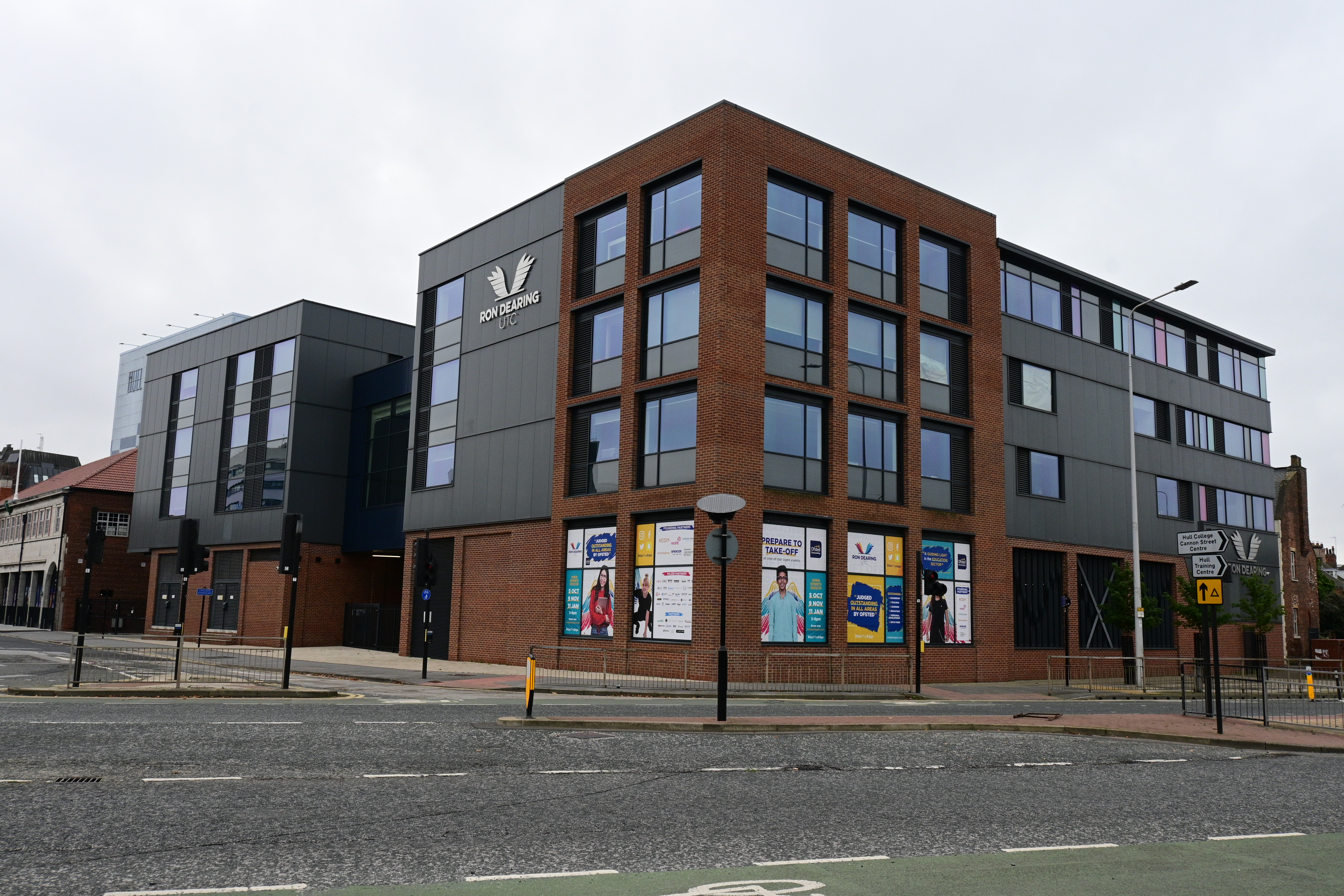

Location
- Kingston Square; Kingston upon Hull, East Riding of Yorkshire, HU2 8BQ; England
- Coordinates: 53°44′53″N 0°20′15″W

Information
- Type: University technical college
- Patron saint: Lord Dearing
- Established: 4 September 2017
- Local authority: Kingston upon Hull City Council
- Trust: Ron Dearing UTC Trust
- Department for Education URN: 144766 Tables
- Ofsted: Reports
- Chair of the Ron Dearing UTC Trust: Charlie Spencer OBE of Spencer Engineering Group
- Principal: Sarah Pashley
- Staff: 34 as of March 2019
- Gender: Mixed
- Age: 14 to 18
- Enrolment: 568 as of August 2020
- Capacity: 800 as of October 2021
- Slogan: #GetTheEdge
- Website: www.rondearingutc.com

Ron Dearing UTC is a university technical college (UTC) which opened in September 2017 in Kingston upon Hull, East Riding of Yorkshire, England.

The UTC is sponsored by the University of Hull and local companies, and is named after the senior civil servant Ronald Dearing.

== Founding partners ==
- KCOM
- Reckitt Benckiser
- Siemens Gamesa
- Smith and Nephew
- Spencer Group
- University of Hull

== Major partners ==
- Fujitsu
- C4DI
- Arco
- Bonus Plug-in Systems
- Ørsted
- Kohler
- Mira Showers
- Rada
- Ideal Heating
- Jupiter
- Sewell Group
- Sauce
- Trident
- Luxinar
- Iris NDT
- LSTC Group
- Equinor
- Porsche Centre Hull
- Humberside Fire and Rescue Service
- Quickline
- Advanced Plastics
- Fit24
- BAE Systems
- sMRT
- Fresh Design
- Pagabo
- Wood
- Cranswick
- Triton Power
- Fisher Security
- Giacom
- NHS

== Partners ==
- Air Products
- AJ Building
- Harper Fox
- Pneumatic Engineering
- Northern Powergrid
- Spectrum
- Litmus
- Alan Wood & Partners
- Ridings Consulting Engineers
- BACB Renewables
- Influence Media
- KLAAFE
- GRAHAM
- East Riding of Yorkshire Council
- Hull City Council
- Fisadco Engineering

== Location ==
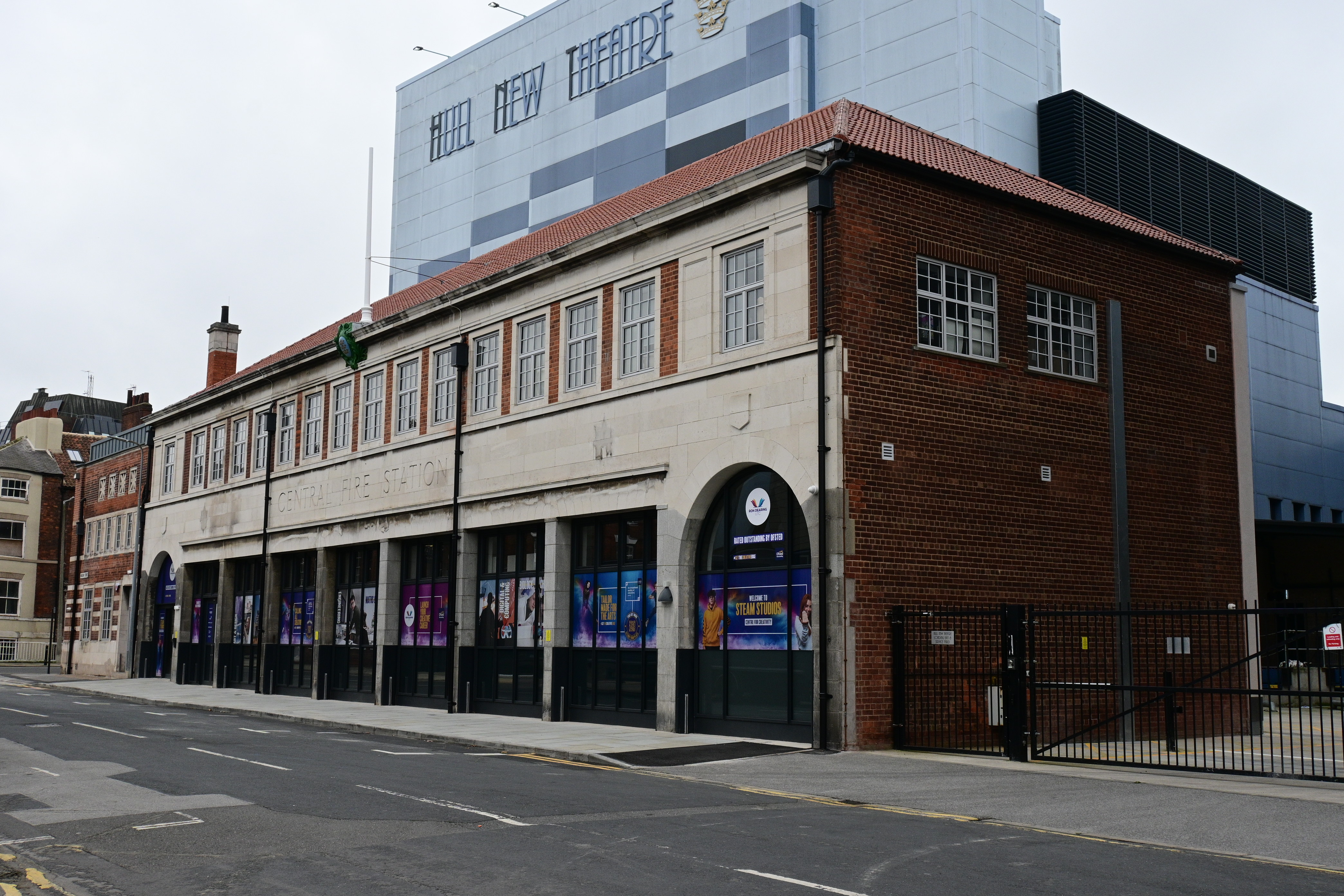
The STEAM Studios, located in the former Central Fire Station

Ron Dearing UTC is located on Kingston Square, Kingston upon Hull. It is situated next door to Hull New Theatre.

The UTC acquired a disused fire station next door to the college in May 2022 for conversion into the STEAM Studios, where students are to be trained in creative arts and engineering classes, raising the UTC's capacity by an additional 120 students. The renovated building was officially opened on 29 September 2023.

== Education ==
Each day starts at 9:15 am and finishes at 5:30 pm. Depending on the students' individual timetable this may or may not be their start/finish times; this is the earliest start, and the latest finish. There are approximately 30 staff employed, who cover a range of subjects including Mechatronics, Electronics, Digital Technology, Creative Digital, Photography (Part of Creative Digital), Engineering, Maths, English, Sciences, and PE. Physical Education (PE) takes place offsite on Tuesdays due to site limitations and the lack of a grassy area or sports hall. These are lacking due to the location.

== Extra-curricular ==
The school has an extra-curricular program called 'enrichment'. Enrichment includes activities such as Sports, Combined Cadet Force and various clubs. On top of this, there are a number of other clubs such as the board games club and electronics club that are run on separate days to enrichment.

== Combined Cadet Force ==
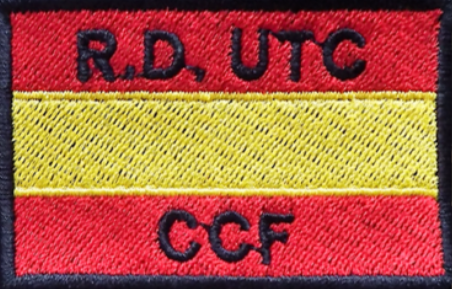
The identity patch for the CCF contingent. Sewn onto the left arm blanking plate.

The school has had a CCF contingent since its opening in 2017.
