= National Record of Achievement =

Student portfolio in the United Kingdom in the 1990s

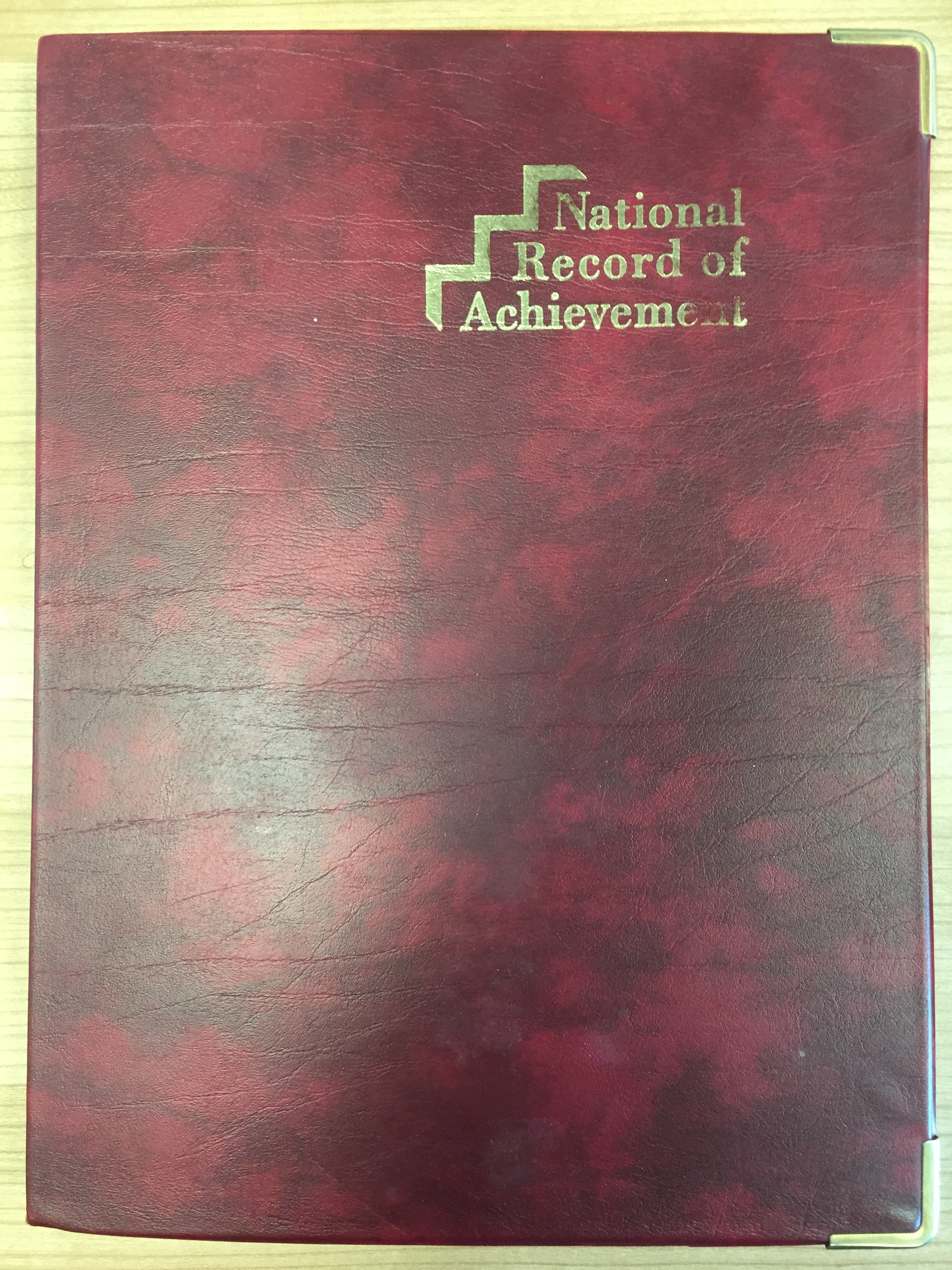
National record of achievement folder

The National Record of Achievement was a folder given to secondary school pupils in the United Kingdom in the 1990s and early 2000s. It was a portfolio of documentation related to a pupil's academic and non-academic achievements, typically including GCSE certificates, certificates from extracurricular activities, school reports and anything else of relevance, presented in a burgundy-coloured folder.

It was introduced in the late 1970s, but did not have widespread use until the 1990s; it was adopted by the Department for Education in 1991 and became mandatory in 1993. The Record was intended to allow pupils to demonstrate skills and achievements beyond their exam results, potentially of use for further education and higher education admissions and to employers. It was hoped that pupils would continue to add to their Records after leaving school.

In practice, the National Record of Achievement failed to meet these aspirations. In the mid-1990s it was common to use them for further education admissions, for instance to sixth form college, but university admissions tutors never found them relevant. Neither further nor higher education institutions encouraged students to continue to update them. Only a small number of employers (typically those used to recruiting large numbers of school-leavers) made use of them alongside the traditional application form, and found them of limited use.

In 1996 the Dearing Review of Qualifications for 16–19 Year Olds recommended a restructuring of the NRA and suggested renaming it the Progress File. Ronald Dearing recommended the winding up of the National Record of Achievement scheme.
