= Greater Peterborough UTC =

Location
- Park Crescent Campus; Park Crescent; Peterborough, PE1 4DZ; England; 52°35′12″N 0°13′59″W

Information
- Type: University Technical College
- Established: 2016
- Local authority: Peterborough
- Department for Education URN: 142902 Tables
- Ofsted: Reports
- Chair of Governors: Robert Robson
- Principal: Lee Mawby
- Gender: Mixed
- Age: 11 to 19
- Enrolment: 479 As of September 2023
- Capacity: 500
- Website: www.gputc.com

Greater Peterborough University Technical College (GPUTC) is Peterborough's only STEM and built environment specialist school for students aged 11 to 19.

Located in Peterborough city centre, the £12 million state of the art school opened in September 2016. UTCs are secondary schools for students that are sponsored by university providers and local employers. They were set up by the government to encourage students to study academic and technical subjects and to provide them the opportunity to learn the skills that employers seek.

Students can join GPUTC in Year 7, Year 8, Year 9, Year 10 or Year 12; in years 9 and 10, they study STEM subjects along with their core GCSE subjects. Students are also given the opportunity to pick from employability GCSEs such as computer science, business studies or art and design. Alternatively, students can join in Year 12 and choose to study a technical qualification in either engineering or the built environment, or traditional A-levels.

GPUTC's employer and education sponsors are represented on the governing body and work closely with the school and students. This is done through offering work experience, industry exposure and a guaranteed job interview upon completion of studies in Year 11 or Year 13, dependent on results at the end of the study.

== Sponsors ==
The UTC is sponsored by Anglian Water, Perkins Engines, Marshall Aerospace, Anglia Ruskin University, Baker Perkins and Peterborough Regional College.
