= UTC Portsmouth =

Location
- London Road; Hilsea; Portsmouth, Hampshire, PO2 9DU; England
- Coordinates: 50.8312°N 1.0706°W

Information
- Type: University technical college
- Established: 2017
- Local authority: Portsmouth
- Department for Education URN: 143430 Tables
- Ofsted: Reports
- Principal: James Doherty
- Gender: Coeducational
- Age: 14 to 19
- Website: https://www.utcportsmouth.org/

UTC Portsmouth is a university technical college which opened in September 2017 in Portsmouth, England.

UTC Portsmouth specialises in teaching STEM subjects with a particular focus on Mechanical and Electrical Engineering disciplines. The UTC's sponsors include the Royal Navy, BAE Systems, QinetiQ, the University of Portsmouth and Portsmouth City Council.

The UTC's building, in the grounds of Trafalgar School, was constructed by BAM Construction over a twelve-month period and was completed during August 2017. The consultant design team were:

- Architect – Stride Treglown
- Structural and Civil Engineer – Ridge and Partners
- Mechanical and Electrical Engineers – Hydrock
- Landscape Architect – Stride Treglown
