= Aston University Engineering Academy =

Location
- 1 Lister Street; Birmingham, West Midlands, B7 4AG; England
- 52.4892°N 1.8859°W

Information
- Type: University Technical College
- Motto: Knowledge for Life & Skills for the Future
- Established: 2012
- Specialist: Engineering; STEM
- Department for Education URN: 138222 Tables
- Ofsted: Reports
- Principal: David Chapman
- CEO, AUSEAT: Daniel Locke-Wheaton
- Gender: Mixed
- Age: 13 to 19
- Enrolment: 601
- Academy trust: Aston University STEM Education Academy Trust (AUSEAT)
- Website: www.auea.co.uk

Aston University Engineering Academy (AUEA) is a university technical college (UTC) that opened in September 2012 in the Gosta Green area of Birmingham, West Midlands, England. Aston University is the lead academic sponsor of the UTC, along with the Science, Technology, Engineering and Mathematics Network. Since September 2025, AUEA has formed part of the Aston University STEM Education Academy Trust (AUSEAT), a multi-academy trust also comprising Aston University Mathematics School and the Goldsmiths' Institute. Business partners of Aston University Engineering Academy include Jaguar Land Rover, Boeing, and Rolls-Royce, as well as various smaller regional employers.

The purpose-built school building is located at 1 Lister Street, on the edge of the Aston University campus within Birmingham's Innovation Quarter.

== Admissions ==
Aston University Engineering Academy admits students at age 13 (Year 9) and age 16 (Year 12). The school's catchment area covers the entirety of the Birmingham metropolitan borough and beyond, with nodal points at six railway stations across Birmingham's area networks to facilitate access from a wide geographical area.

== Description ==
Aston University Engineering Academy specialises in engineering and associated STEM subjects. It takes pupils from Year 9 onwards. Pupils aged 13 to 16 study a core selected number of GCSEs alongside either a Higher Diploma or BTEC First Diploma in Engineering.

At sixth form level, through Aston University Sixth Form, students can choose between four study programmes:

- An Advanced Diploma in Engineering and an additional A level
- BTEC National Diploma in Engineering and an additional A level
- Mathematics and Science A levels programme
- T Levels (in areas including Engineering, Health, and Optometry)
- Apprenticeships

The school was inspected by Ofsted in January 2022, when it was judged to be Good, with Outstanding Personal Development. The academy is oversubscribed, with 96% of students progressing to higher education, apprenticeships or employment, and 69% progressing directly to university.

== Aston University STEM Education Academy Trust ==
In October 2024, the regional director for education and the West Midlands Advisory Board approved Aston University's application to sponsor a multi-academy trust. The Aston University STEM Education Academy Trust (AUSEAT) formally opened on 1 September 2025 and brings together:

- Aston University Engineering Academy and Aston University Sixth Form
- Aston University Mathematics School (AUMS)
- The Goldsmiths' Institute, a jewellery skills training centre

Daniel Locke-Wheaton, who had served as principal and then executive principal of AUEA since 2012, was appointed as founding CEO and executive principal of AUSEAT. He was succeeded as principal of AUEA and Aston University Sixth Form by David Chapman, who had previously served as vice-principal and then head of school at AUEA for ten years.

== The building ==
The academy building is a new-build scheme, built on the site of a former manufacturing facility demolished many years before. It backs onto the Grand Union Canal and is opposite Faraday Wharf, and within easy walking distance of the sponsors Aston University campus. The scheme formed part of Birmingham's Building Schools for the Future programme before it was cancelled, and as such was built by Lend Lease. The Architect was Feilden Clegg Bradley Studios, with civil and structural consultants Cox Turner Morse, and building services consultants Cundall.

The academy comprises approximately 6,500m² of accommodation over 3 floors (excluding basements). Unusually, due to changes in ground level from front to back of the site, the main entrance is at first floor level, with the reception area opening out into a triple-height atrium and staircase at the heart of the building. Site constraints, and the proximity to the inner ring road of Dartmouth Middleway, required the building to be very compact and needed to insulate the occupants from external traffic noise and poor air quality. Consequently, the building has a high performance sealed facade and glazing system, and required a heavily serviced solution to provide the necessary heating, ventilation and comfort cooling for the occupants. To offset potentially high energy consumption and running costs, the services design incorporates a full fresh air ventilation system with free cooling and energy recovery, a basement thermal labyrinth, a small Combined Heat and Power (CHP) engine, energy efficient lighting systems, and 50kWp of photovoltaic panels. The canal elevation is more sheltered and provides for hard landscaped dining and community areas for students. The design achieved a RIBA West Midland Regional Award 2013.

A further building at 2 Lister Street was subsequently acquired to house Aston University Mathematics School and to accommodate the trust's expanded student numbers.

== See also ==
- Aston University Mathematics School
