= Greater Manchester University Technical College =

The Greater Manchester University Technical College

Location
- Middleton Road; Oldham, Greater Manchester, OL9 6DE; England; 53.5423°N 2.1214°W

Information
- Type: University technical college
- Established: 2014
- Closed: 2017
- Department for Education URN: 140542 Tables
- Age: 14 to 19
- Website: http://www.thegm.co.uk/

The Greater Manchester University Technical College, branded as "The GM", was a University Technical College in Oldham, Greater Manchester, United Kingdom. The college specialised in sustainable and civil engineering and opened in September 2014. Owing to low pupil numbers and poor pupil attainment, the college closed less than three years later at the end of the 2016–17 academic year.

== History ==
The GM was sponsored by the University of Bolton and by Michael Dwan, a director of Bright Tribe Trust. A new building was constructed on Middleton Road next to Oldham College at a cost of £9m, and it cost a further £5m to run. The college opened in September 2014. Its first principal and chief executive officer was Chris Hill, formerly an education officer at Oldham Council.

It closed less than three years later in July 2017 having failed to attract students, and failing to get a significant number of students a pass grade in GCSE Maths and English; in the summer of 2016 there were none.

== Future of the site ==
The site was later used by Oasis Academy Oldham to educate Year 7 pupils who do not have a secured school place. It was reported that up to £150,000 would first be spent to make the building safe and structurally sound. The building, which was maintained by Blue Support Services, another of Dwan's companies, had missing fire doors and malfunctioning lifts, among other structural issues.

Dwan had applied in 2016, before the UTC closed, to open a government-funded free school next to the building. The application was declined by the Department for Education.
