= UTC Derby Pride Park =

Location
- Locomotive Way, Pride Park; Derby, Derbyshire, DE24 8PU; England; 52°54′54″N 1°27′25″W

Information
- Former name: Derby Manufacturing UTC
- Type: University technical college
- Established: September 2015
- Local authority: Derby City Council
- Trust: Sheffield UTC Academy Trust
- Department for Education URN: 147685 Tables
- Ofsted: Reports
- Principal: Richie Wheatcroft
- Gender: Mixed
- Age range: 13–19
- Enrolment: 82 (2020)
- Capacity: 600
- Website: www.utcderby.org.uk

UTC Derby Pride Park (formerly Derby Manufacturing UTC) is a 13–19 mixed university technical college in Pride Park, Derby, Derbyshire, England. It was established in September 2015 and is part of the Sheffield UTC Academy Trust. It specialises in engineering and life sciences.

== History ==
Derby Manufacturing UTC was established in September 2015 as a 14–19 mixed university technical college, with a specialism in engineering and manufacturing. Supported by Derby City Council, it was a partnership between Derby College, University of Derby, Rolls-Royce, Bombardier and Toyota. It was rated 'inadequate' and placed into special measures following its inspection by Ofsted in 2017, and despite two monitoring visits since, the college failed to improve its rating. In December 2019, it renamed to UTC Derby Pride Park and became part of the Sheffield UTC Academy Trust, with a specialism in engineering. The college maintained its original partners, and changed its entry age to 13 and added a second specialism of life sciences in September 2020. In December 2023 UTC Derby Pride Park was inspected by Ofsted graded good overall with outstanding for behaviours and attitudes.
