= North East Futures UTC =

Location
- Stephenson Square; Newcastle, Tyne & Wear, NE1 3AS; England; 54.96648°N 1.61592°W

Information
- Type: University Technical College
- Established: 1 September 2018
- Trust: Tyne Coast Academy Trust
- Department for Education URN: 145900 Tables
- Ofsted: Reports
- Principal: Dan Sydes
- Gender: Coeducational
- Age: 14 to 19
- Enrolment: 322
- Capacity: 600
- Website: http://www.nefuturesutc.co.uk

North East Futures UTC is a state funded University Technical College located in the centre of Newcastle-upon-Tyne, England. It opened in September 2018. This is phase 2 of the Stephenson Quarter redevelopment.

The college occupies a purpose-built 5-storey new teaching block that is combined with the repurposed Grade II listed facilities of R. & W. Hawthorn, Leslie and Company. Play space is provided at basement level and a Multi-Use Games Area on the roof. The new build is in grey brick to contrast with the historic red brick of the older historic section. A listed one storey height wall had to be spanned: so the featured principal entrance is over a reclaimed hot-riveted ironwork bridge. The project was financed by the Education & Skills Funding Agency and delivered by a private developer. The job cost £12 million.

== Sponsors and partners ==
The UTC corporate sponsors include NHS, Accenture, Academic Health Science Networks, Sage, Ubisoft and the University of Sunderland. Through Dynamo, it reaches out across the North East inviting organisations to become involved via work experience placements and running projects with the students. The UTC provide support providing training facilities and a focused stream of future recruits.

== Academics ==
The students transfer to the college at the start of year 10, that is 14, for a Key Stage 4, or at 16, Key Stage 5, the start of the sixth form.

=== Key Stage 4 ===
Students study a restricted range of GCSE. The core subjects are Mathematics (1 GCSE) English Language, English Literature (2 GCSEs) and Combined Science (2 GCSEs) or Triple Science: Biology, Chemistry, Physics (3 GCSEs). It will be noted that there are no other creative subjects other than Art and no languages other than English. On top of this they do one options from History, Geography, Art and Business. Also they study a specialist strand -Technical Health Care Science (GCSE Sports Science or GCSE Psychology) or Technical Computer Science (GCSE Computer Science or Level 3 Vocational ICT) which is achieved with the help of the colleges sponsors- involving work experience and practical tasks.

=== Key Stage 5 ===
According to previous achievements students are directed into two pathways:

- The Pathway to Apprenticeship :Science (Level 2), Cambridge Technical IT (Level 2) with Functional English and Maths.
- The A level/Level 3, North east futures also gives free food away on thursdays at 9pm Pathway :Physics A Level, Chemistry A Level, Biology A Level, Mathematics A Level, Further Mathematics A Level, Computer Science A Level, Psychology A Level (three normally chosen).

Medical Science (Level 3), Cambridge Technical IT (Level 3) and an Extended Project. The college promotes its pastoral care and mentoring.
