= Brook Sixth Form and Academy =

University technical college in Dagenham, Greater London, England

Location
- Yew Tree Avenue; Dagenham, Greater London, RM10 7FN; England; 51.546614°N 0.167851°E

Information
- Type: University Technical College
- Established: 1 September 2014
- Department for Education URN: 148932 Tables
- Ofsted: Reports
- Gender: Coeducational
- Age: 14 to 19
- Enrolment: 272
- Capacity: 600
- Website: www.brooksixthform.com

Brook Sixth Form and Academy is a University Technical College (UTC) in Dagenham, East London, England. It provides technical and academic education for students aged 14–19. It serves students from boroughs including Barking and Dagenham, Havering, Newham, Redbridge and Thurrock. Brook Sixth Form and Academy is sponsored by Ford Motor Company and University College London.

The school is part of the Partnership Learning Trust.

== History ==
Brook Sixth Form and Academy opened in September 2014 as East London University Technical College (Elutec). It was initially located within the CEME campus and moved to the London East Business and Technical Park in 2015. In September 2023, the college was renamed Brook Sixth Form and Academy.

== Campus ==
Brook Sixth Form and Academy is located on Yew Tree Avenue, Rainham Road South, Dagenham, within the London East Business and Technical Park. The purpose-built campus opened in 2015 following relocation from its original site at the CEME campus. The site includes specialist facilities supporting its technical curriculum.

== Standards ==
The school was inspected by Ofsted in November 2024, with the report published in January 2025. Inspectors judged the school to be 'Good' for quality of education, leadership and management, and sixth-form provision, and 'Outstanding' for behaviour and attitudes and personal development.
