= University Technical College Norfolk =

Location
- Old Hall Road; Norwich, Norfolk, NR4 6FF; England; 52.5987°N 1.2793°E

Information
- Type: University technical college
- Established: 1 September 2014
- Local authority: Norfolk
- Department for Education URN: 141086 Tables
- Ofsted: Reports
- Head teacher: Emma Palik
- Gender: Coeducational
- Age: 14 to 19
- Enrolment: 266
- Capacity: 600
- Website: https://utcn.org.uk

University Technical College Norfolk is a University Technical College in Old Hall Road, Norwich, with a focus on the engineering and health sectors.

It is operated by multi-academy trust the Community Schools Trust.

== Description ==
The University Technical College Norfolk is a 14-19 school, providing Key Stage 4 and Key Stage 5 education. Entry to the school is in year 10. Student take their GCSEs in year 11. The school operates a sixth form for year 12 and 13 students.

Whilst retaining a core curriculum in year 10 and 11, the school focuses on engineering and health sector. The school offers post 16 course such as A-level, T-Level.

== Partners ==
University Technical College Norfolk has developed partnerships with a number of high profile employers including EDF Energy Aviva plc, Lotus Cars, Vattenfall, Warren Services, Royal Air Force.

== Apprenticeships ==
The school has gained a reputation for helping students access high level apprenticeships. In 2022, 14 students turned down places at Russell Group Universities to take up apprenticeships at companies including Jaguar Land Rover, Rolls Royce, and GlaxoSmithKline.

== Ofsted ==
The school was rated GOOD in all categories following an Ofsted inspection in May 2019.

Key findings;

- Careers education, information, advice and guidance (CEIAG) provided to pupils is of a very high quality.
- Pupils are friendly and welcoming.
- The quality of teaching is typically good.
- The school’s curriculum is a key strength.
- High-quality teaching in all subjects.
- The students were responsive, well behaved and well protected.

== Campus ==
University Technical College Norfolk is housed in the former Connaught factory.
