= UTC Warrington =

Coordinates: 53.3927°N 2.5954°W

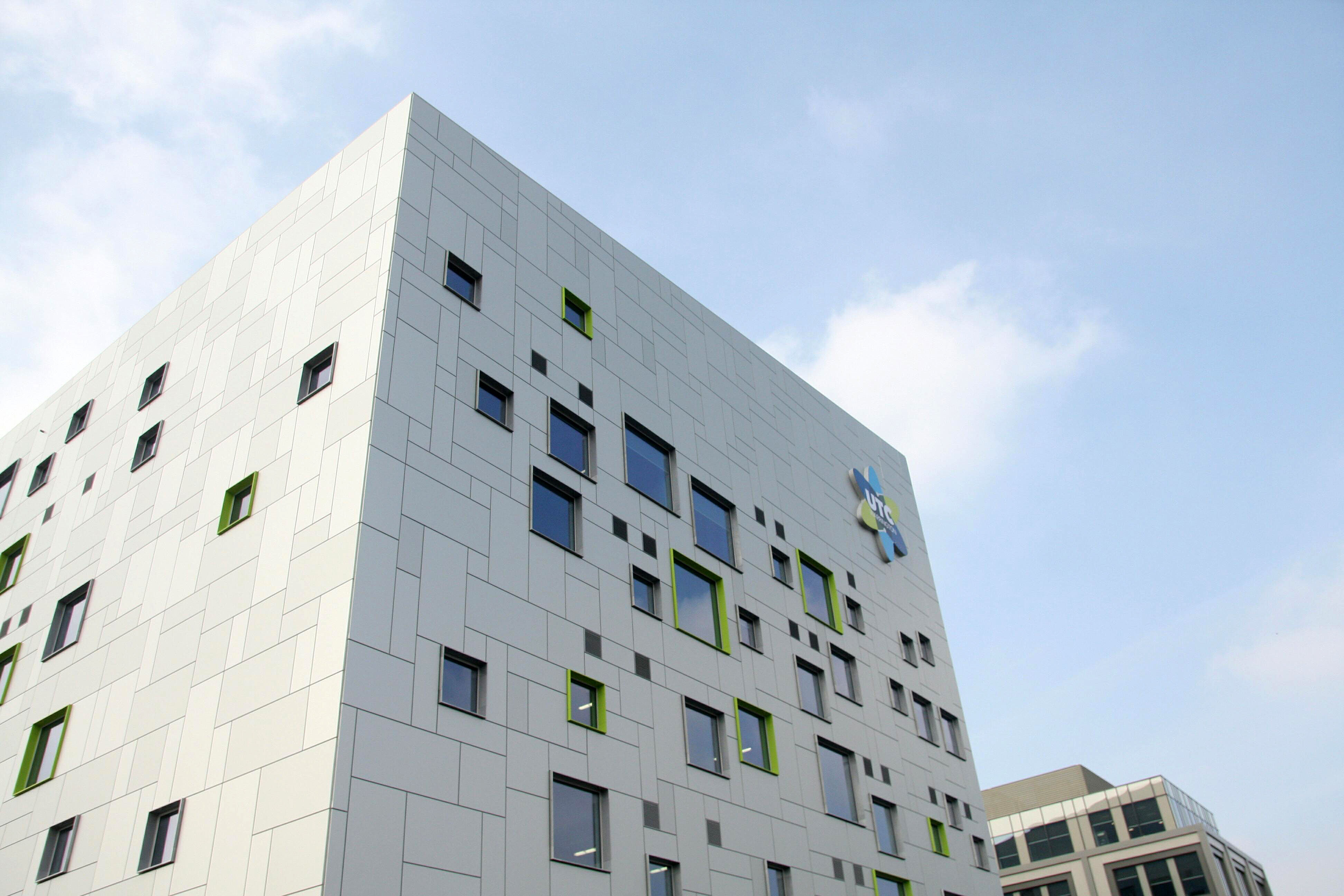
- UTC Warrington on Dallam Lane

Location
- Dallam Lane; Warrington, Cheshire, WA2 7NG; England

Information
- Type: UTC
- Motto: "Professional Standards"
- Religious affiliation: Mixed religion
- Established: 2016
- Local authority: Warrington
- Department for Education URN: 142899 Tables
- Ofsted: Reports
- Head of College: Chris Hatherall
- Gender: Mixed
- Age: 13 to 17
- Enrolment: 357
- Website: https://utcw.co.uk

UTC Warrington is a university technical college which opened in September 2016 in Warrington, United Kingdom. It is for students aged 13 to 17, and focuses on science, Digital, Construction and engineering. The UTC is sponsored by Manchester Metropolitan University and engineering companies including Sellafield Ltd, Amec Foster Wheeler, Rolls-Royce, National Nuclear Laboratories, Atkins, Fircroft Engineering, Kawasaki Robotics and Jungheinrich.

It is located in the heart of Warrington's Stadium Quarter redevelopment area, where it acts as an anchor tenant.
