= South Wiltshire UTC =

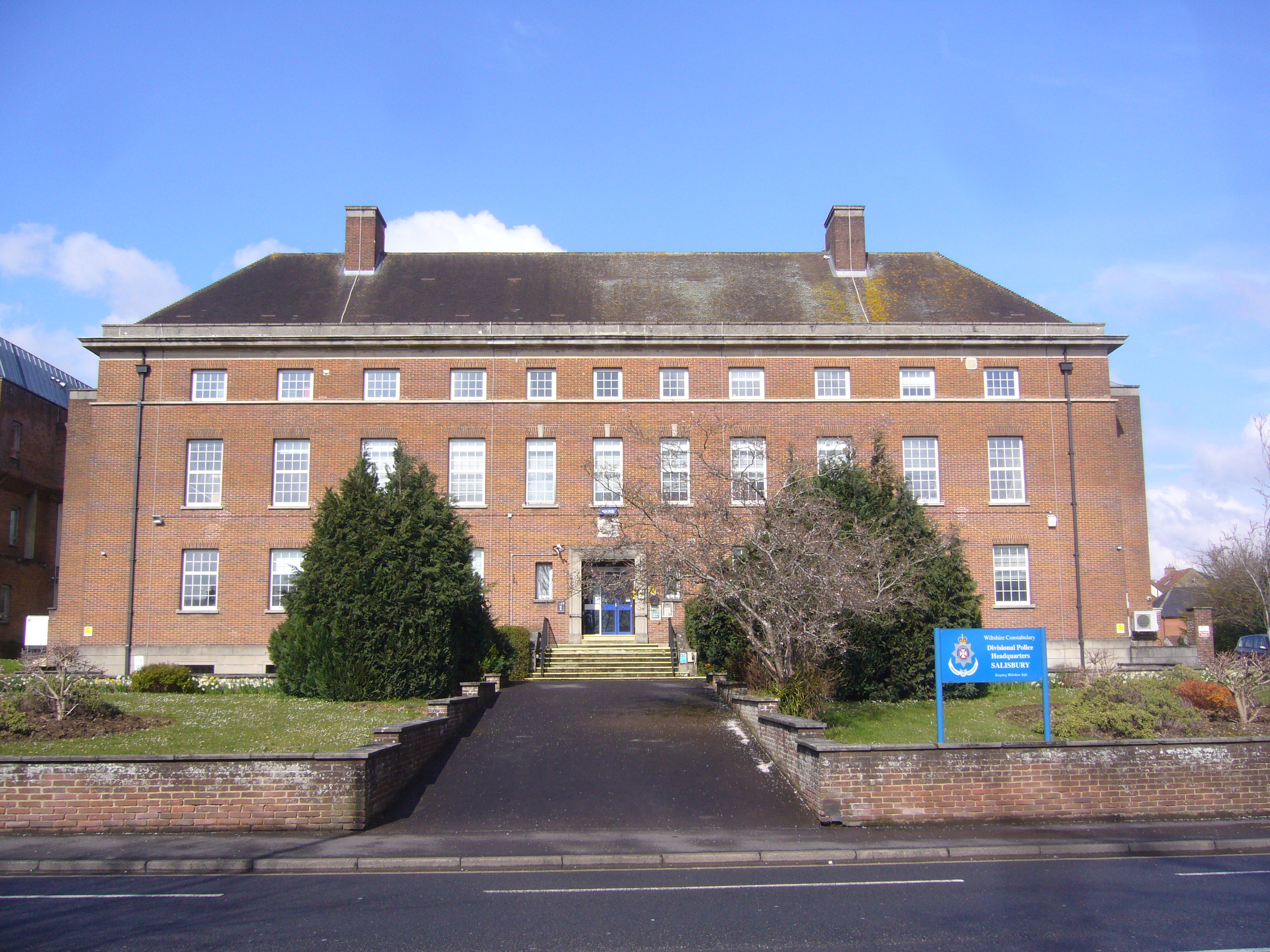
- Divisional Police Headquarters in 2014

Location
- 72 Wilton Rd; Salisbury, Wiltshire, SP2 7EU; England; 51.0742°N 1.8147°W

Information
- Type: University Technical College
- Established: 2015
- Closed: 2020
- Local authority: Wiltshire
- Department for Education URN: 141964 Tables
- Ofsted: Reports
- Chair of Governors: Peter Thomson
- Gender: Mixed
- Age: 14 to 19
- Enrolment: 120
- Capacity: 600

South Wiltshire UTC was a mixed University Technical College (UTC) in Salisbury, Wiltshire, England. It opened in 2015 and catered for students aged 14–19 years.

The college specialised in science and engineering, and was backed by the University of Southampton. Its site on Wilton Road, about 1 mile (1.6 km) west of the centre of Salisbury, was a refurbished former police headquarters.

In July 2019, it was announced the college would not be accepting students in September 2019, and would be closed in August 2020 as the Department for Education deemed it "no longer financially viable". The one-year delay was for the benefit of students already a year into their two-year courses.
