= Sir Simon Milton Westminster UTC =

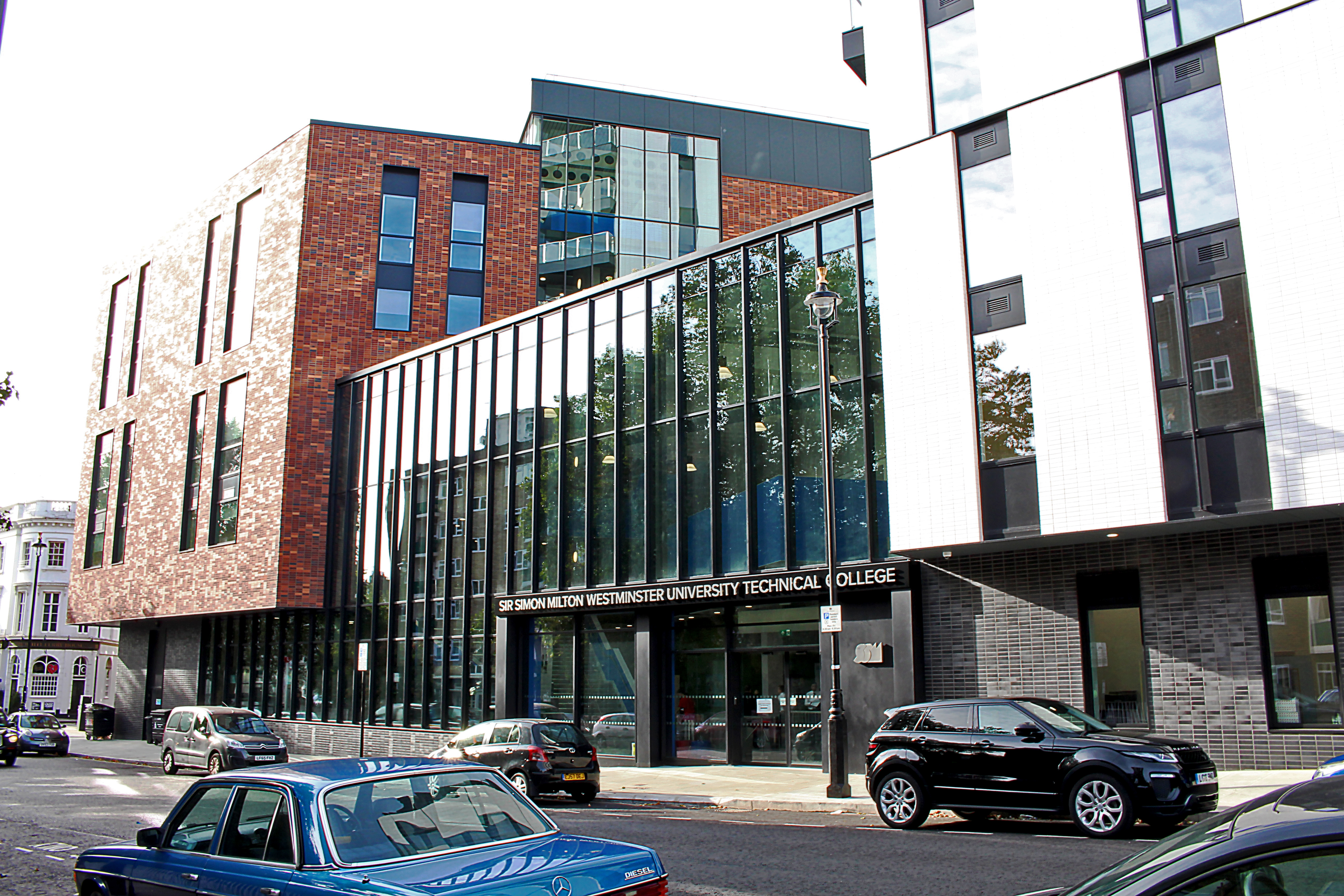

Location
- 1 Sutherland Street; London, SW1V 4LD; 51.4894°N 0.1472°W

Information
- Type: University technical college
- Established: 2017
- Closed: 2022
- Local authority: City of Westminster
- Department for Education URN: 144819 Tables
- Headteacher: Dan Chandrakumar
- Gender: Coeducational
- Age: 14 to 19
- Enrolment: 202 as of April 2021
- Capacity: 550
- Website: www.westminsterutc.co.uk

Sir Simon Milton Westminster UTC, simply referred to as Westminster UTC, was a 14–19 university technical college (UTC) in the Pimlico area of Westminster in London. As a UTC, it specialised in STEM subjects, particularly transport engineering, construction, and the built environment.

The University Technical College offered academic and technical qualifications in maths, science or engineering, for students interested in careers in the transport and built environment industries. It was established by the Sir Simon Milton Foundation in honour of the late Simon Milton, and it was supported in a partnership with the University of Westminster, City of Westminster College, Network Rail, Landsec, Sir Robert McAlpine, Alstom, BT Fleet, Colas Rail, Westminster City Council and Transport for London.

It was built on the assumption that it would attract 550 students. By May 2021 it was over two-thirds empty. Andrew Christie, the chair of the governors announced it would not take any new students in September 2021, which would result in its closure. The UTC was still in its period of exemption from inspection, so no Ofsted report has been published.

The UTC formally closed at the end of August 2022.

== History ==
In January 2014, Education Secretary Michael Gove announced the government's approval of six proposed UTCs, including a proposal by the Sir Simon Milton Foundation to set up a UTC in central London. Located in Westminster, the planned Sir Simon Milton UTC would cater for 550 students and specialise in transport engineering and construction. The foundation's proposal was supported by Network Rail, which would serve as the school's lead employment sponsor, and the new UTC would be supported in a partnership between them and other leading employers such as BT Fleet, Land Securities, Transport for London and Mace. The University of Westminster and Westminster City Council was also included in this partnership. By 2017, Sir Robert McAlpine and Alstom had joined the partnership, and by 2018 Colas Rail was also involved. Network Rail also had a governor installed at the school.

The school was established and named in honour of the late Simon Milton, a former leader of Westminster City Council who also served as a deputy to London mayor Boris Johnson. It opened on 1 September 2017 with four other UTCs.

== Site ==
The school was located on 1 Sutherland Street, Pimlico, on the Ebury Bridge development site in Victoria. This site was built by Linkcity in partnership with Taylor Wimpey Central London and Westminster City Council and included both the school's building, which occupied 56,000 square feet, and a tower block standing 11 storeys tall. The site itself takes up half an acre of land. Three London Underground stations, London Victoria, Sloane Square and Pimlico, are located nearby. Specifically, London Victoria is five minutes away on foot.

Work on the building for the school began in July 2016, with Simon Milton's partner Robert Davis attending the groundbreaking ceremony. It replaced the original Westminster Adult Education Service building, which was constructed in 1898. The old building's datestones were preserved in the new building's design. It was completed in September 2017 at a cost of £15,739,942. £30,297 of this was spent on acquiring the building. It included a sports hall. Since the school's closure, it has been used by Ada College.
