= UTC South Durham =

Location
- Long Tens Way; Aycliffe Business Park; Newton Aycliffe, County Durham, DL5 6AP; England; 54°35′42″N 1°34′44″W

Information
- Type: University Technical College
- Established: 2016
- Local authority: Durham
- Department for Education URN: 142894 Tables
- Ofsted: Reports
- Chair of Trustees: Gary Holmes
- Principal: Tom Dower
- Gender: Mixed
- Age: 14 to 19
- Enrolment: 600
- Website: http://www.utcsouthdurham.org/

UTC South Durham is a University Technical College located in Newton Aycliffe, County Durham. It opened in 2016 and caters for 14–19 year olds with an interest in science, technology, engineering, and maths. It is located on the Aycliffe Business Park site, in a purpose-built new building.

The UTC is sponsored by the University of Sunderland, Gestamp and Hitachi.

== Building ==
The school is located on the Aycliffe Business Park. It was designed by Ryder Architecture and built by contractor Willmott Dixon.

The building has a triple-height specialist engineering block housing specialist engineering equipment. Students have access to science labs, classrooms, computer suites, a gym, and a Sixth Form area as well as a café.

== Academics ==
85% pupils are boys, and White British. There are a small number of pupils are from minority ethnic groups or speak English as an additional language. The proportion of pupils known to be eligible for support through the pupil premium is above the national average. The proportion of pupils with special education needs (SEND) is well above the national average though the proportion of pupils who have an education, health and care plan is broadly average.

=== KS4 ===
There is core curriculum of English, Maths, Science and Engineering. Other options include Business, Computer Science, Geography, Information Technology, and Product Design. The college covers the government required PHSRE; support is given in careers and interview techniques.

In year 10 and 11, students wear a business style uniform that is provided by Cre8tive Graphics. All students wear appropriate protective clothing in the engineering hall which is provided free of charge.

KS5

At Sixth Form students mainly study one of two pathways. A two year Level 3 route of three or four A-levels and equivalent qualifications, or a one or two year pre-apprenticeship route of practical engineering skills. A level options include Science, Maths, Engineering, Product Design and Computer Science.

In Sixth Form students wear business attire. All students wear appropriate protective clothing in the engineering hall which is provided free of charge.

Student Leaver Profile

Designed by staff, students, parents, business partners and the wider community the Student Leaver Profile represents what UTC South Durham wants for their students. Throughout the curriculum and extra-circular activities, students get the chance to develop their academic and technical knowledge and understanding, as well as their professional career experiences and core skills.

The Baker Award for Technical Education

All students get the opportunity to complete The Baker Award for Technical Education To achieve this award students must complete a minimum of one week of work experience.

All students at UTC are encouraged to complete a work experience placement:

- Year 10 students are encouraged to complete one week of work experience
- Year 12 students are encouraged to complete two weeks of work experience
- Year 11 and Year 13 students are encouraged to complete a work experience or gain an extended work placement during their holidays and free time

=== Progress 8 results comparison with other Aycliffe schools ===
In 2019 Ofsted noted "Published information about how well pupils achieve in secondary schools is based on their progress from the end of Year 7 to the end of Year 11. As pupils start the UTC in Year 10, using published information to evaluate their progress would be misleading, as they only attend this school for two years." Ofsted did not address why KS4 outcomes were substantially lower than the schools they recruit from.

Progress comparison
	2018	2019	2020	2021
Greenfield	-0.26 (below average)	-0.51 (well below average)	–	–
UTC South Durham	-1.05 (well below average)	-1.15 (well below average)	–	–
Woodham	+0.1 (average)	+0.1 (average)	–	–
Local Authority	−0.23	−0.2	–	–
Maintained School National Average	−0.23	+0.3	–	–

Results from 2020 and 2021 were not published due to exam disruptions caused by the COVID pandemic.

=== Ofsted report judgements ===
- 2019 – Good
- 2024 – Good

== Principals ==
- Tom Dower, 2016 – present
