= Dearing Report =

Review of higher education in the United Kingdom

The Dearing Report, formally known as the reports of the National Committee of Inquiry into Higher Education, is a series of major reports into the future of Higher Education in the United Kingdom, published in 1997. The report was commissioned by the UK government and was the largest review of higher education in the UK since the Robbins Committee in the early 1960s. The principal author was Sir Ronald Dearing, the Chancellor of the University of Nottingham. It made 93 recommendations concerning the funding, expansion, and maintenance of academic standards.

The title "The Dearing Report" is also often given to the 2001 report "The Way Ahead: Church of England schools in the new millennium" which was chaired by Lord Dearing.

== Findings ==
The report recommended that undergraduate tuition change from being funded entirely by grants from the government to a mixed system in which tuition fees, supported by low interest government loans, are raised. It recommended expanding sub-degree courses and degree level courses at university, proposing that there was sufficient demand from employers for applicants with higher qualifications for natural growth of higher education. The report also proposed giving teaching staff some amount of training in teaching during their probationary period. It further proposes a system in which credit earned at one institution could be transferred to another.

== Committee members ==
1997 report

- Sir John Arbuthnott
- Brenda Dean
- Sir Ronald Dearing (Chairman)
- Sir Geoffrey Holland
- Sir Ronald Oxburgh
- David E. Potter
- Sir George Quigley
- Sir William Stubbs
- Sir Richard Sykes
- Sir David Watson
- Sir David Weatherall

2001 report

- Lord Dearing
- The Rev John Hall

== See also ==
- Browne Review
