= The Watford UTC =

Coordinates: 51.6660°N 0.3868°W

Location
- Colonial Way; Watford, Hertfordshire, WD24 4PT; England

Information
- School type: University Technical College
- Established: 2014
- Closed: 2023
- Trust: The Baker Dearing Educational Trust
- Department for Education URN: 141004 Tables
- Ofsted: Reports
- Principal: Paul Quinn
- Gender: Mixed
- Age: 14 to 19
- Capacity: 600
- Hours in school day: 9-5
- Website: https://www.watfordutc.org

The Watford UTC was a 14–19 University Technical College (UTC) in Watford, England that opened in September 2014 The UTC specialised in Event Management, Hospitality and Computer Science.

The UTC's sponsors were the University of Hertfordshire, Hilton Worldwide (whose European base is in Watford), The Grove, Toshiba, and Twin Technology who specialise in server provision and virtualisation. The UTC was also sponsored by Meller Educational Trust, founded by David Meller, and The Baker Dearing Educational Trust. The school had also received support during Richard Harrington's tenure as Watford MP, and his successor's tenure Dean Russel who served as a governor of the school.

== History ==
It was visited by Ofsted in 2017 and declared a good school. In 2018 it failed to set a balanced budget and had its funding monitored by central government.

The school struggled to attract pupils, and in 2021 it announced plans to open a Key Stage 3 section, teaching eleven year olds.

The Department for Education confirmed that The Watford UTC would close at the end of the 2022/2023 academic year. The school formally closed at the end of August 2023. Financial figures showed a net revenue deficit of £103,000 in 2021-22, with a net book value of fixed assets valued at £7.7 million.

== Education ==
The school focused on providing academic education with specialisms in vocation education.

In addition to offering academic and vocational GCSE / Level 2 and A Level / Level 3 qualifications, the school would encourage students to partake in extra-curricular activities and work placements. Examples include:

- Using a NAO - programmable humanoid robot.
- Planning and managing student led events with event spaces such as The Innovation Hub, student led travel agency Escape, and Refresh Cafe.
- Student nationwide competitions.
- Industry work placements

The following subjects were offered between 2017 and 2019. The information was accessed via the Watford UTC website's page on courses offered. However the website has now shut down, and the information should be viewed as legacy information. This information was originally uploaded to this wiki page in 2019.

=== KS4 (2017–2019) – Year 10/11 ===
Category	Subjects
Core subjects	GCSE English Language and Literature; GCSE Maths; GCSE Science (Double)
Core choice	GCSE Computer Science; European Computer Driving Licence
Specialism	BTEC IT; BTEC Travel and Tourism with Event Management; BTEC Hospitality; BTEC Business
Additional GCSE options	SPDM Level 2 (Smart Product Design & Manufacture); Media; Photography; Spanish; French
Notes	KS4 students must undertake all core GCSE subjects and choose one subject from the core choice section. Students must also choose one specialism subject and two additional GCSEs. Options available have changed over time, with some subjects replaced due to low interest (e.g., GCSE History). Students fluent in other languages (e.g., Polish or Japanese) can take GCSEs in those languages.

=== Post-16 (2017–2019) – Year 12/13 ===
Category	Subjects
Core subjects	Extended Project Qualification (EPQ); Student Support Programme; Industry Links/Work Placements
Notes on core subjects	The EPQ is mandatory. The student support programme provides study assistance. Students must undertake work placements to bolster CVs and UCAS applications.
Specialism subjects	BTEC IT; BTEC Travel & Tourism; BTEC Business; BTEC Media
A-level options	English Literature; Maths; Further Maths; Computer Science; Physics; French; Spanish; Photography
Other possible A-level options	Students may undertake A-levels not officially offered by the school, such as self-studied subjects (e.g., Polish Language A-level). Some A-level options may be removed or introduced over time (e.g., Sociology was once offered but later removed).

== Notable alumni ==
- Tom Lish – English judoka who won a gold medal in the 90 kg category at the 2017 Commonwealth Youth Games in Nassau, Bahamas.
- The school highlighted the achievements of its alumni through posts on its social media platforms.

== Social Media ==
- YouTube: Watford UTC
- X (formerly Twitter): @TheWatfordUTC
- X (formerly Twitter): @WatfordUTC
- Facebook: Watford UTC
- Instagram: The Watford UTC
