= Engineering UTC Northern Lincolnshire =

Location
- Carlton Street; Scunthorpe, North Lincolnshire, DN15 6TA; England
- Coordinates: 53°35′28″N 0°38′38″W

Information
- Type: University Technical College
- Established: 2015
- Local authority: North Lincolnshire
- Department for Education URN: 142130 Tables
- Ofsted: Reports
- Chair of Governors: Graham Thornton
- Principal: Anesta Mcallaugh
- Gender: Mixed
- Age: 13 to 19
- Enrolment: 230
- Website: www.enlutc.co.uk

Engineering UTC Northern Lincolnshire is a mixed University Technical College in Scunthorpe, North Lincolnshire, England. It opened in September 2015 as Humber UTC and caters for students aged 13 to 19 (year 9 to year 13).

The school's site is in Scunthorpe town centre. Industry partners include the University of Hull, Phillips 66, Tronox, ABP Humber, Orsted, RAF, Airco, STEM UK, North Lincolnshire Council and others.

The school was rebranded from Humber UTC to Engineering UTC Northern Lincolnshire in early 2018.

The school extended its provision to include a year 9 cohort in November 2018, after approval from the Department for Education (DfE).
