= Doncaster UTC =

University technical college in Doncaster, South Yorkshire, England

Location
- College Road; Doncaster, South Yorkshire, DN1 3BF; England
- Coordinates: 53.5189°N 1.1325°W

Information
- Type: University Technical College
- Established: September 2020
- Department for Education URN: 147838 Tables
- Ofsted: Reports
- Principal: Jim Semmelroth
- Gender: Co-educational
- Age: 13 to 19
- Website: www.doncasterutc.co.uk

Doncaster UTC is a university technical college in Doncaster, South Yorkshire, England which opened in September 2020.

The college is sponsored by the University of Sheffield, Sheffield Hallam University and local employers. It specialises in engineering, particularly railway engineering, and its newly constructed building in the town centre has capacity for 750 students.

The UTC received a "Good" Ofsted inspection in 2022.
