= Mulberry UTC =

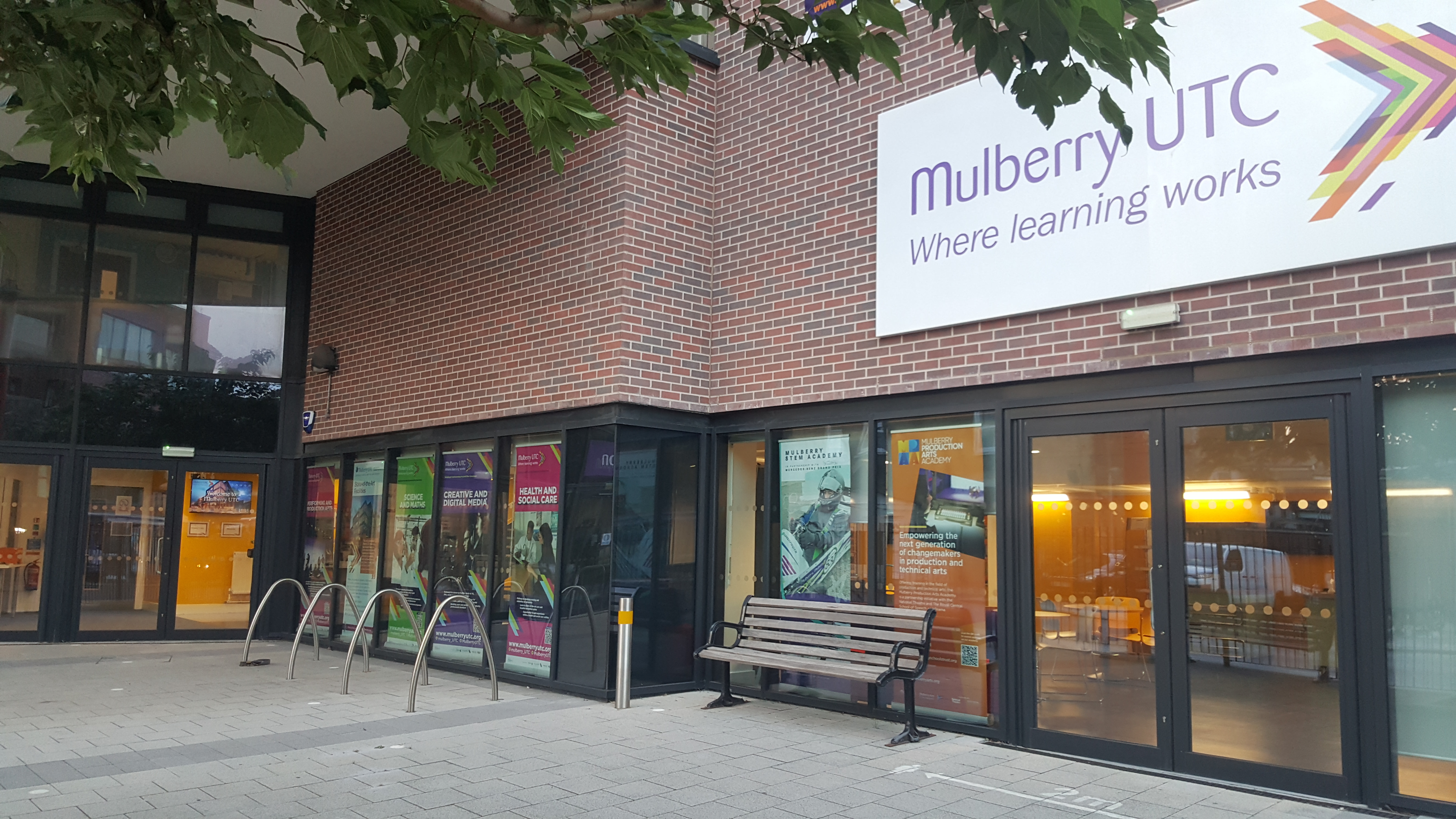

Location
- 64 Parnell Road; Old Ford, Bow; London, E3 2RU; United Kingdom; 51.5339°N 0.0264°W

Information
- Type: University Technical College
- Motto: Where learning works
- Established: 2017
- Founder: Katharine Vincent
- Local authority: Tower Hamlets
- Trust: Mulberry Schools Trust
- Department for Education URN: 144756 Tables
- Headteacher: Katharine Vincent
- Gender: Coeducational
- Age: 14 to 18
- Enrolment: 312 as of April 2012
- Capacity: 800
- Website: mulberryutc.org

Mulberry UTC is a university technical college in Old Ford, London, which opened in September 2017. The school is part of the Mulberry Schools Trust, a multi-academy trust operating in Tower Hamlets.

The UTC's sponsors are Goldsmiths (University of London), Bank of America Merrill Lynch, Barts Health NHS Trust, the British Film Institute and the National Theatre.

== Building ==
Mulberry UTC occupies the site of the former Bow Fire Station in East London. The architects were Scott Brownrigg, and it was built by Wates Construction It has a BREEAM rating of Excellent. The contract was worth £9.5m. At 6,400 sq m over 5 storeys, it incorporates a purpose-built 250-seat theatre, a media suite, a set construction workshop, and a health suite.

== Description ==
This is a UTC so students join at the age of 14 for Key Stage 4 in year 10, or at 16 for Key Stage 5 in year 12. At Key Stage 4, pupils follow a core curriculum in English, mathematics, science and humanities, and choose from options within a specialist curriculum. At Key Stage 5, pupils combine the study of technical and vocational courses with the study of A levels in relevant subjects.
