= Crewe Engineering and Design UTC =

Location
- West Street; Crewe; Cheshire, CW1 2PZ; England
- Coordinates: 53.1011°N 2.4425°W

Information
- Type: University technical college
- Established: 1 September 2016
- Local authority: Cheshire East
- Trust: The Learning Partnership
- Department for Education URN: 142890 Tables
- Ofsted: Reports
- Principal: William Chitty
- Gender: Coeducational
- Age: 14 to 19
- Enrollment: 256 (October 2024)
- Capacity: 400
- Website: http://www.utccrewe.co.uk/

Crewe Engineering and Design UTC is a university technical college located in Crewe, Cheshire, England.

The UTC is sponsored by Manchester Metropolitan University, Bentley Motors Limited, Whitby Morrison and several other local engineering and design companies. It opened in September 2016.

== Context ==
Crewe is a Cheshire town with a significant railway and engineering history. Crewe Engineering and Design UTC was established in 2016 to address the shortage of youngsters entering engineering, and in 2019 was rated 'good' by Ofsted who described it as ‘transforming’ the lives of its students.
