= London East Business and Technical Park =

Business park in Dagenham, England

- Interactive map of London East Business and Technical Park
- Location: Dagenham, London
- Coordinates: 51.5463°N 0.1694°E
- Manager: BD Group
- Owner: Barking and Dagenham London Borough Council
- Website: www.londoneast-uk.com

London East Business and Technical Park, stylised in marketing as LondonEast-UK, is a business park in Dagenham, England.

Since 2019 it has been owned by BD Group, a subsidiary of Barking and Dagenham London Borough Council.

== Tenants ==
The Elutec university technical college moved to the site in 2015. It changed its name to Brook Sixth Form and Academy in September 2023.

Planning permission for the Eastbrook Studios film studios complex on the site was granted in July 2020.

The NTT Communications London 1 data centre was opened on the site in December 2020.

PEARL (Person-Environment-Activity Research Laboratory), part of University College London, was opened on the site in 2022.
