= Hackney University Technical College =

Location
- Shoreditch Campus; Falkirk Street; Hackney, London, N1 6HQ; England; 51.53055°N 0.07931°W

Information
- Type: University Technical College
- Established: 2012
- Closed: 2015
- Department for Education URN: 138265 Tables
- Ofsted: Reports
- Age: 14 to 19

Hackney University Technical College was a university technical college (UTC) that opened in September 2012 in the Shoreditch area of the London Borough of Hackney in Greater London, England. The University of East London and Hackney College were the lead academic sponsors of the UTC, and BT Group and Homerton University Hospital NHS Trust were the lead business sponsors. The college closed in August 2015.

== History ==
Hackney UTC was the first UTC to be established in London, and opened in September 2012 in new dedicated buildings at the main campus of Hackney College. The UTC has an initial intake of students aged 14 (academic year 10) in 2012, but expanded to accommodate students aged 14 to 19 over the following years.

In January 2014 Hackney UTC received its first Ofsted section 5 inspection which judged the school as "Requires Improvement" across all four key indicators: Achievement of Pupils, Quality of Teaching, Behaviour/Safety of Pupils and Leadership and Management. A "Grade 3" school requiring improvement is not yet a good school. Ofsted goes on stating that such a school will receive another full inspection within 24 months of the last inspection.

In July 2014 it was announced that Hackney UTC would not receive new students and would close fully in 2015. The reason for closure was that the school received only 29 applications for September 2014 out of a target of 75.

The University Technical College is now closed and has ceased to exist as an independent entity.

== Curriculum ==
Hackney UTC specialised in health technologies and digital technologies, and aimed to train local children for employment in the Silicon Roundabout area of East London, working in partnership with local technology firms and educational institutions.

Pupils aged 14 to 16 followed a course of 60% general education (GCSEs) and 40% specialisms. For sixth form students, this split reversed to 40% general education and 60% specialisms.
