= UTC Plymouth =

Location
- Park Avenue; Devonport; Plymouth, Devon, PL1 4RL; England; 50°22′40″N 4°10′31″W

Information
- Type: University Technical College
- Established: 2013
- Department for Education URN: 146560 Tables
- Ofsted: Reports
- Principal: Polly Lovell
- Age: 11 to 19
- Enrolment: 147 as of April 2021
- Capacity: 650
- Website: http://www.utcplymouth.org/

UTC Plymouth is a university technical college (UTC) that opened in the Devonport area of Plymouth, Devon, England in September 2013.

The college is located on the site of the former Parkside Community College on Park Avenue. The campus was extensively rebuilt and refurbished for the opening of the UTC in 2013.

== Sponsors and partners ==
The University of Plymouth is the university sponsor of the UTC, while City College Plymouth and Plymouth City Council are the other sponsors. UTC Plymouth are affiliated to the Royal Navy. Employer partners of UTC Plymouth include Babcock International, Becton Dickinson, DS Smith, Fine Tubes, Invensys, Plessey, Princess Yachts, UTC Aerospace Systems, VI-Spring, MVV Environment and Wrigley Company.

== Admissions ==
UTC Plymouth had an initial intake of students aged 14 and 16 (academic years 10 and 12) in 2013 and expanded to accommodate students aged 14 to 19 over the following years. In September 2020 UTC Plymouth welcomed students from Years 7 and 9 for the first time.

The primary catchment area of the UTC is Plymouth, South Devon and South East Cornwall. Where the number of applications for admission to the UTC is greater than the number of places, priority is given to students living nearest the school.

== Curriculum ==
UTC Plymouth specialises in marine engineering and advanced manufacturing. Pupils in Year 7 follow a broad based curriculum including traditional subjects such as Maths, English and Science, as well as Engineering. German is the foreign language studied. Pupils aged 14 to 16 study a core amount of GCSEs which includes a GCSE in Design and Technology. Pupils also study a BTEC First Diploma in either engineering or manufacturing. Sixth form students have the option to study a range of A Levels as well as BTEC Nationals in engineering and manufacturing.
