= University Collegiate School =

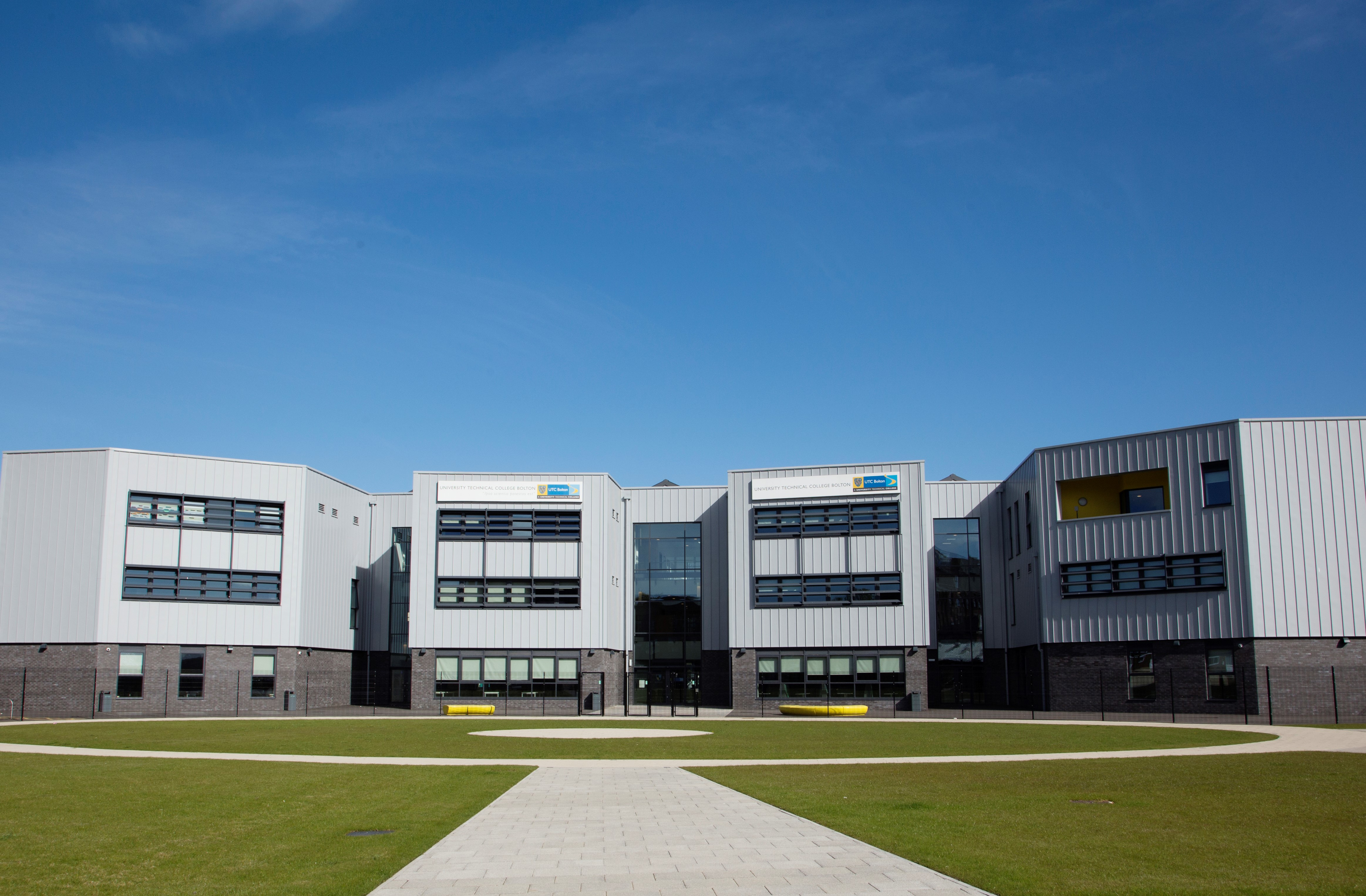

Location
- Deane Rd; Bolton, Greater Manchester, BL3 5AG; England; 53°34′26″N 2°26′20″W

Information
- Type: UTC
- Motto: "Professional, Responsible, Loyal"
- Established: September 2015
- Local authority: Bolton
- Trust: QUEST
- Department for Education URN: 141941 Tables
- Ofsted: Reports
- Principal: Ian Barry
- Gender: Mixed
- Age: 11 to 19
- Enrolment: 542 (May 2025)
- Capacity: 600
- Website: www.theucs.org.uk

University Collegiate School is a mixed secondary school in central Bolton, England, now classed as a free school. It opened in 2015 on a new site on the University of Bolton campus as Bolton UTC, a university technical college for students aged 14–19; in September 2020 it was renamed and began accepting students at age 11.

== Description ==
In September 2020, the school became a member of The Keys Federation Academy Trust and reopened as a free school, the University Collegiate School, in response to demand for secondary school places in Bolton. At that time the Principal, Nicola Glynn, described it as a "school and college".

Following an Ofsted inspection in September 2024, University Collegiate School is rated 'Good' in all areas.

During the 21/22 academic year a number of staff left, including the Principal, Nicola Glynn. In December 2022, the school was inspected by Ofsted and was judged 'inadequate' in every category. Dave Terry was appointed as interim Principal in February 2023.

== Predecessor UTC ==
Bolton UTC was officially opened in November 2015 by Prince Edward, Earl of Wessex. It specialised in health sciences and technology, and its £10 million facilities included laboratories for optometry, clinical dentistry, pharmaceutical consulting, medical simulation, robotics and electronics.

The UTC used a project-based learning pedagogy. It offered a core GCSE curriculum to its 14–16-year-old students which included English Language, Mathematics, English Literature, Biology, Chemistry, Physics, Geography, History, Spanish, French, German, Computer Science, Psychology, Sport Science and Health and Social Care.

At A-level, students were given a choice of pathways: engineering or health sciences focused. At A-level they could study English Language, Mathematics, Further Mathematics, English Literature, Biology, Chemistry, Physics, Geography, Psychology, Computer Science, BTEC Level 3 Applied Science and BTEC Level 3 Health and Social Care.

The UTC entered 'special measures' after it was rated 'inadequate' in all categories at its first Ofsted inspection in 2017. The inspection report said there had been "considerable failures at the most senior leadership level", governors had been ineffective, and links with local industry were weak. Pupils said they had little opportunity to use the "outstanding facilities".

In 2018, the Education and Skills Funding Agency issued a "final notice to improve" to the UTC, after a review found inadequate financial controls and breaches of policies.

At the next full inspection in 2019 the UTC was rated 'good' in all categories; at that time 159 were enrolled although its capacity was 600.
