= Lincoln UTC =

Technical college for ages 14–19 in Lincoln, England

Lincoln University Technical College

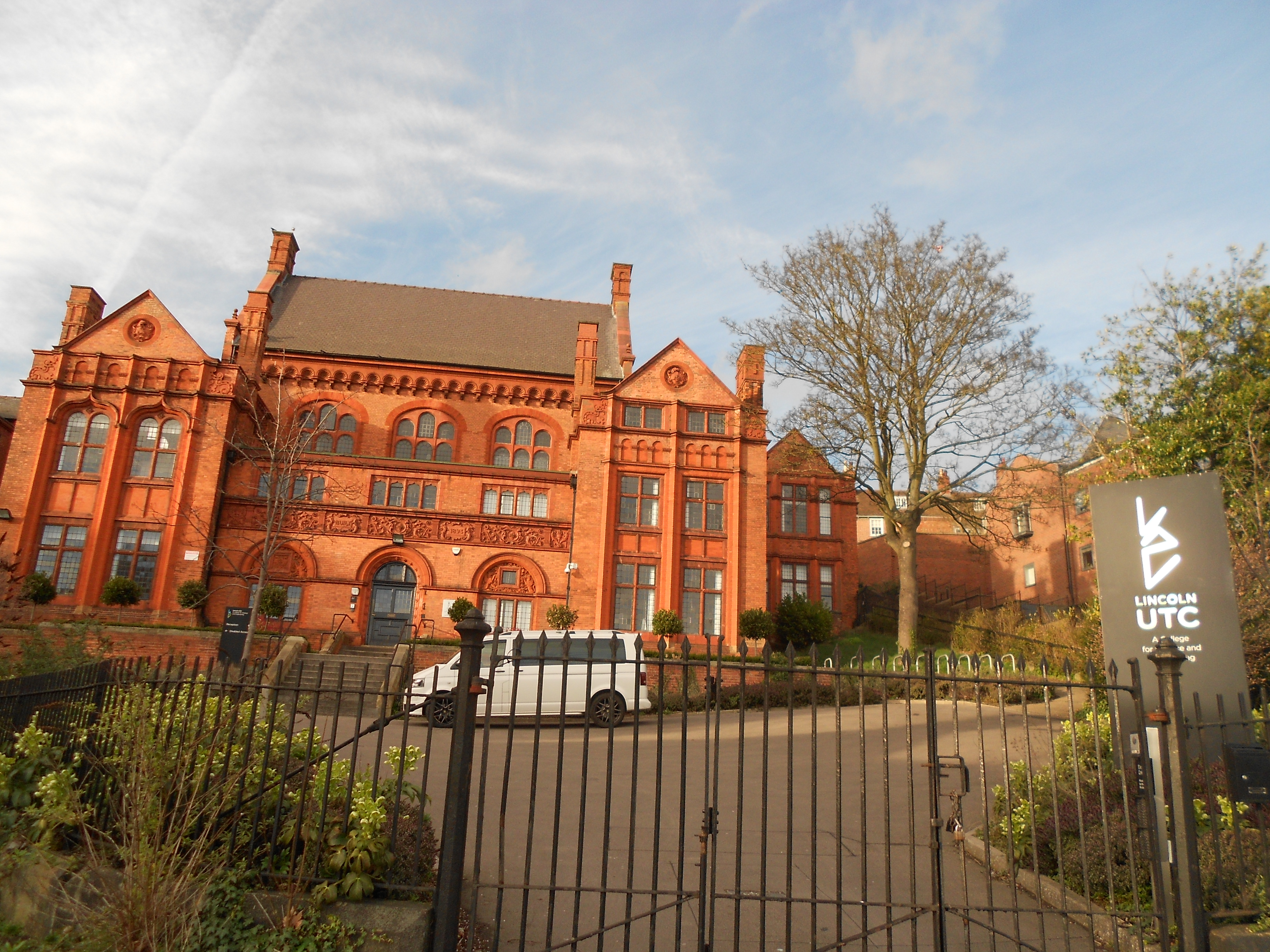

Location
- Lincoln UTC; Lindum Road; Lincoln, LN2 1PF; England; 53.232324°N 0.534546°W

Information
- Type: University Technical College
- Established: 1 September 2014
- School district: Lincolnshire
- Department for Education URN: 140950 Tables
- Ofsted: Reports
- Principal: Stu Hamer
- Age: 14 to 19
- Enrolment: 396 (as of 2024)
- Capacity: 640
- Website: lincolnutc.co.uk

Lincoln UTC is a University Technical College in Lincoln, England which opened in 2014 and specialises in science and engineering. The school is sponsored by the Baker Dearing Educational Trust.

== History ==
The founding principal was Dr. Rona Mackenzie. She left the UTC after three and a half years, in January 2017 and was replaced by Mr Paul Batterbury. John Morrison was appointed as Paul Batterbury's successor in September 2017. Stuart Hamer is the current Principal of Lincoln UTC, appointed in September 2024.

For 2014-15 the UTC was located in Chad Varah House on Wordsworth Street. In September 2015 the UTC moved to a permanent site at the Greestone Centre on Lindum Road. The former girls school and Grade II-listed building underwent a £7.5 million investment and refurbishment, which included the construction of a science and engineering block. The build took eighteen months contractors including Willmott Dixon led by architects JR Roberts.

In 2022, Lincoln UTC were recognised for their excellent teaching and support staff in the Lincolnshire Education Excellence Awards: Mr Chung, a Mathematics and English teacher at the UTC since 2018, won the Teacher of the Year Award; Mr Coy won Assistant Teacher of the Year Award; Mr Morrison was nominated for the Headteacher of the Year Award.

== Curriculum ==
At Key Stage 4, the students study Two GCSE equivalent specialism a restricted set of GCSE: missing are any languages or any humanities.

The Lincoln UTC offer a variety of A-Level, BTEC and T-Level courses for post-16 students; the curriculum looks to expand into new subjects in the next few years.

== Campus and facilities ==
There are six science laboratories and eight engineering workshops. Scientific equipment available includes autoclaves, spectrometers, electrophoresis devices, spectrophotometers, laser cutters, milling machines, 3D printers and DNA extraction tools.

== Sponsors ==
The UTC's principal partners are Siemens, the University of Lincoln and Lincoln College. With other partners including Branston, RAF, North Kesteven District Council, Great Plains, Cummins, RWE, Eminox, Luxus, James Dawson and Morgan Tucker.
