= South Devon UTC =

Location
- Kingsteignton Road; Newton Abbot, Devon, TQ12 2QA; England; 50°32′02″N 3°36′29″W

Information
- Type: University Technical College
- Established: 2015
- Founder: Lord Baker and Lord Dearing
- Local authority: Devon
- Department for Education URN: 141749 Tables
- Ofsted: Reports
- Co-chairs of Governors: James Trout; David Goldsmith
- Principal: Claire Plumb
- Gender: Mixed
- Age: 14 to 19
- Enrolment: 206
- Capacity: 600
- Website: https://southdevonutc.org.uk/

South Devon UTC is a mixed University Technical College (UTC) located in Newton Abbot, Devon, England. It opened in 2015 and caters for students aged 14–19 years. It is located on a former motor dealer site, which was vacated in 2012.
