= Energy Coast UTC =

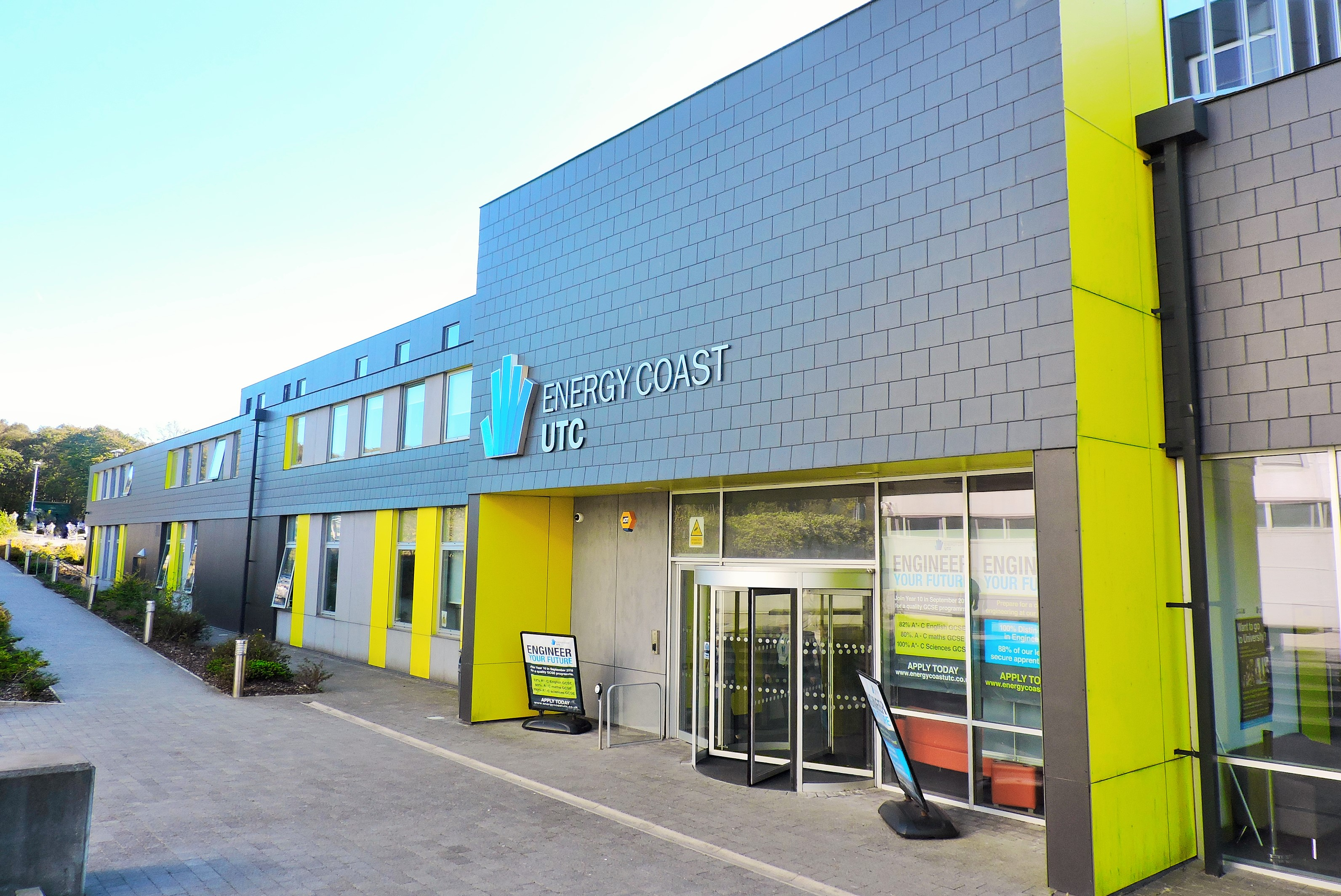
- The Energy Coast UTC building in Lillyhall, Workington

Location
- Blackwood Road; Workington, Cumbria, CA14 4JW; 54.615075°N 3.521192°W

Information
- Type: University Technical College
- Established: 3 September 2014
- Local authority: Cumberland Council
- Department for Education URN: 140600 Tables
- Ofsted: Reports
- CEO: Cherry Tingle
- Gender: Coeducational
- Age: 14 to 19
- Enrolment: 304 (as of April 2021)
- Capacity: 560
- Website: http://www.energycoastutc.co.uk/

Energy Coast is a University Technical College (UTC) on the outskirts of Workington, Cumbria that opened in September 2014 for students of ages 14–19.

The "Energy Coast" is the coastal region between Silloth and Barrow-in-Furness, it includes the Sellafield nuclear power site and Nuclear Decommissioning Authority as well as wind farms at Walney Island and Robin Rigg.

Energy Coast UTC specialises in engineering. In September 2017, the UTC extended it Key Stage 4 provision, by enrolling 20 pupils into a new year 9. The college works with two training providers, Gen2 and the Lakes College, who offer engineering and construction courses.

== History ==
The UTC's first Principal, Gary Jones, resigned from his post in November 2015 citing personal reasons. Then, Cherry Tingle took over the position in September 2016, after a series of interim heads, until September 2022 as she was promoted to CEO of all UTCs. Current principal, Kerryann Wilson has held the role since Tingle’s promotion to CEO.

=== September 2015 virus scare ===
On 25 September 2015, Energy Coast UTC was temporarily closed following a suspected viral outbreak on its campus; however it was later discovered that there was no virus. Any symptoms displayed by were found to be unrelated or psychosomatic and there were no lasting effects. As a precaution when the cause was still unknown, the school was closed for two days for a deep clean.

=== 2017 Ofsted ===
After months of turbulence and two interim principals, Cherry Hinton was appointed as principal in time to front the UTC first Ofsted inspection. Ofsted acknowledged that changes were being implemented, giving an overall judgement of 'Requires improvement' in all five criteria under consideration.

=== June 2019 Ofsted ===
Energy Coast UTC had received a 'requires improvement' rating in a 2017 judgement that prompted significant structural changes. In June 2019 it was rated 'outstanding' by Ofsted. Energy Coast is only one of two UTCs to be rated 'outstanding'. It remains under a 'financial notice to improve' from the Department for Education. It was unusual that it 'outsourced' some its teaching to its sponsors without applying compulsory competitive tendering procedures.

== Sponsors ==
The UTC is sponsored and partnered with several local and national companies. The Energy Coast UTC also regularly works with the Armed Forces, and Morgan Sindall Infrastructure. Morgan Sindall Infrastructure sponsor many aspects of the school, more notably, they pay for each students first school uniform including, Steel-Toed boots. They also sponsor many aspects of the building itself, including its classrooms and classroom equipment to further improve the pupils education. Morgan Sindall Infrastructure also regularly and internationally hire Energy Coast UTC students as apprentices in their many available roles.

== Curriculum ==
The UTC specialises in STEM subjects (science, technology, engineering and mathematics), with an emphasis on Engineering. Secondary Level Education includes several engineering qualifications, including the new, industry approved, "Design Engineer Construct!" course.
