= London Design and Engineering UTC =

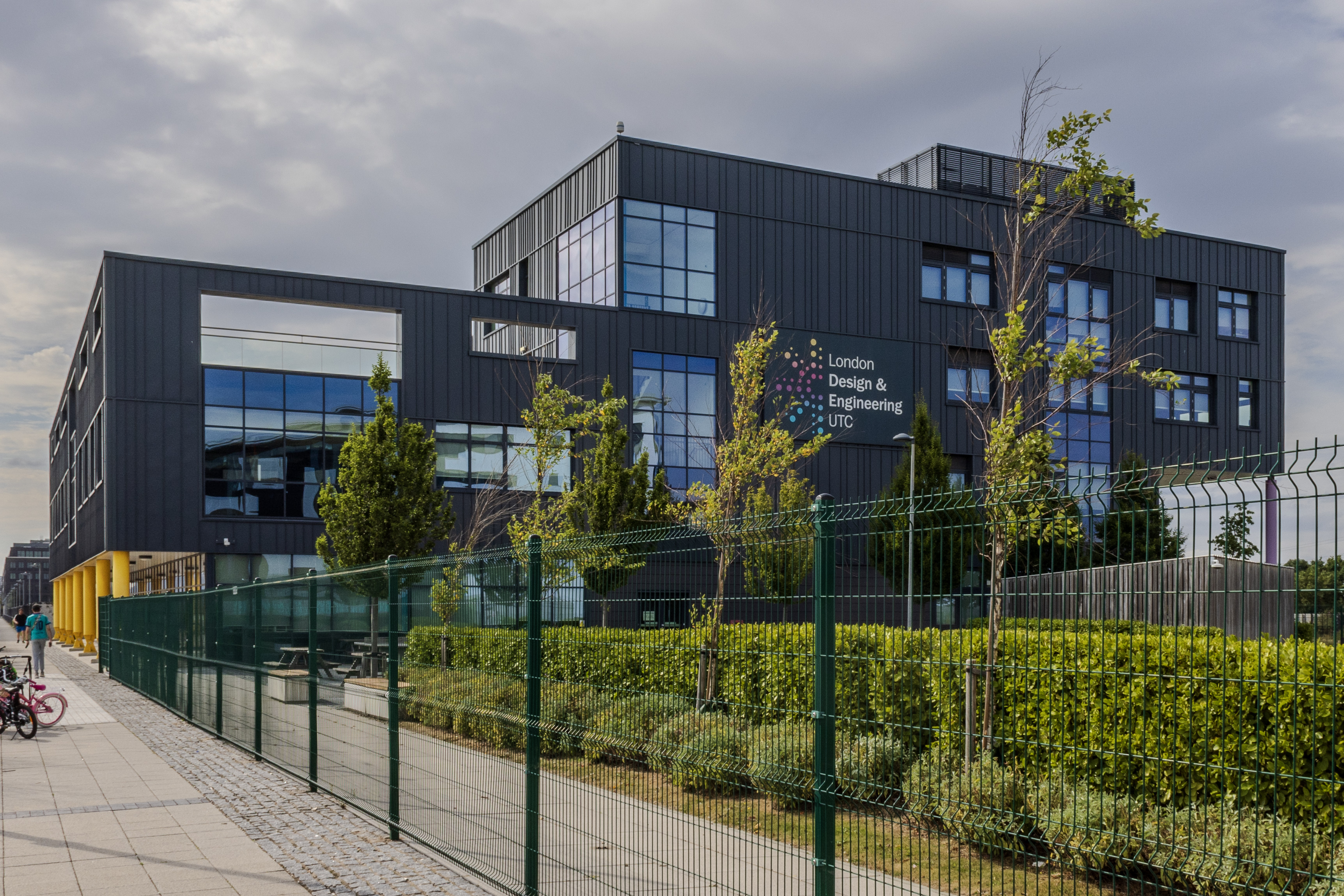

Location
- 15 University Way; London, E16 2RD; England
- Coordinates: 50.770°N 0.266°E

Information
- Type: University Technical College
- Established: 2016
- Founder: Geoffrey Fowler
- Local authority: Newham
- Department for Education URN: 142903 Tables
- Ofsted: Reports
- Chair of Directors: Dusty Amroliwala
- Head teacher: Geoffrey Fowler
- Gender: Mixed
- Age: 13 to 19
- Enrolment: 179
- Capacity: 600
- Website: https://www.ldeutc.co.uk/

London Design and Engineering UTC is a mixed University Technical College which opened in September 2016 at the University of East London campus in the Royal Docks area of the London Borough of Newham. It caters for students aged 13 to 19 years.

The UTC is sponsored by the University of East London, Thames Water, Costain Group, Skanska and the Diocese of Chelmsford Educational Trust.
