= University technical college =

Type of secondary school in England

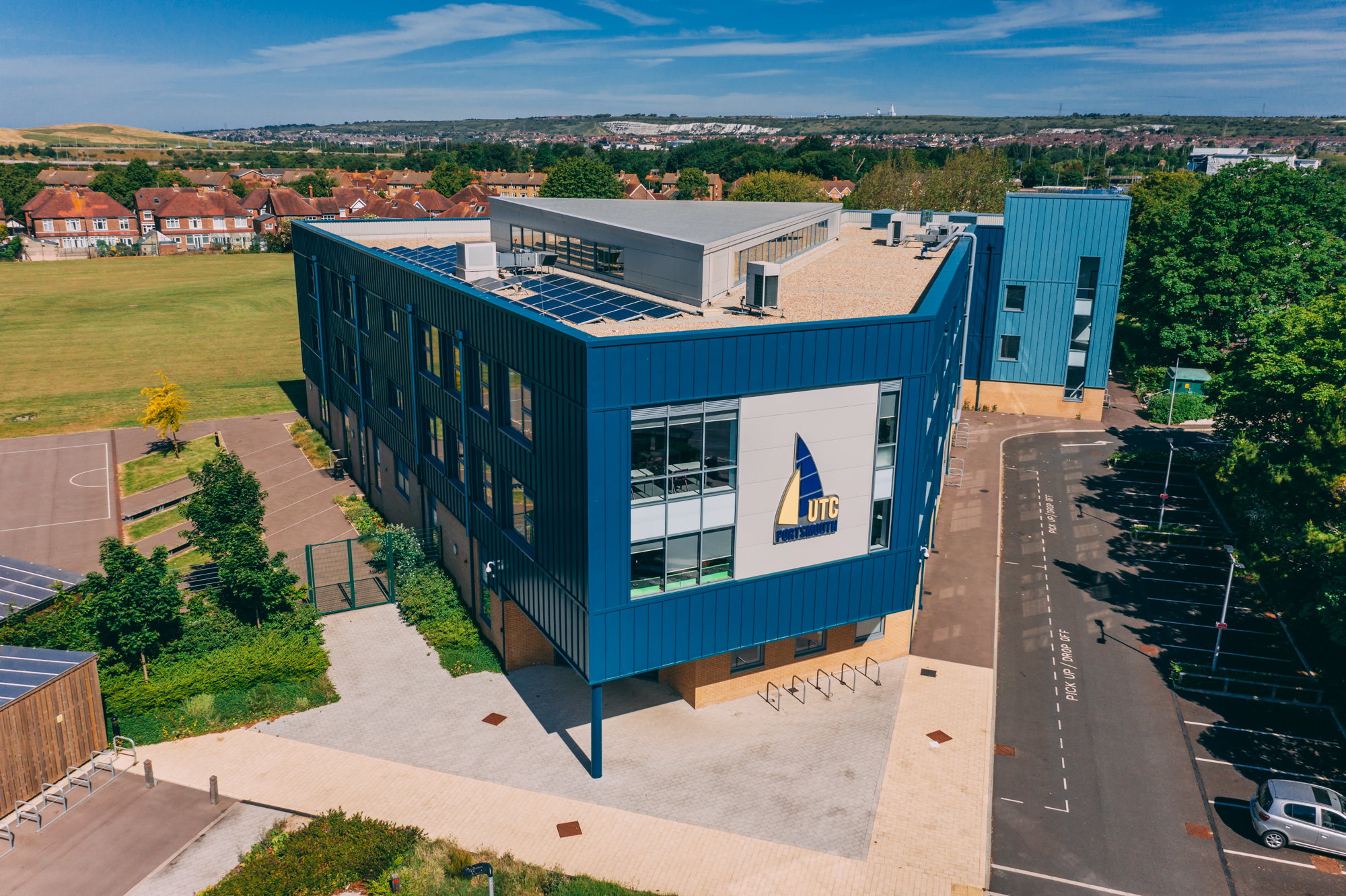
UTC Portsmouth in 2020

A university technical college (UTC) is a type of secondary school in England that is sponsored by a university and has close ties to local business and industry.

University technical colleges specialise in subjects like engineering and construction, taught alongside business skills and the use of IT. Pupils study academic subjects as well as practical subjects leading to technical qualifications. The curriculum is designed by the university and employers, who also provide work experience and projects for students.

The university and industry partners support the curriculum development of the UTC, can provide professional development opportunities for teachers, and guide suitably qualified students on to industrial apprenticeships or tertiary education. The UTC's governors include representatives from the sponsor university and partner employers. Students traditionally transfer to a UTC at the age of 14, part-way through their secondary education, though many UTCs now accept pupils at a younger age. The first UTCs were established in 2010, and there were 44 of them in 2023.

== Description ==
A university technical college is a non-selective free school funded directly by the Department for Education, free to attend, and outside the control of the local education authority.

Students study core academic subjects, as well as practical subjects which lead to technical qualifications. The curriculum is designed by the university and employers, who also provide work experience for students.

UTCs were conceived and supported by the Labour government and introduced in 2010 by the coalition government under the free schools programme. UTCs are collectively distinctive in that they offer technically oriented courses of study, combining National Curriculum requirements with technical and vocational elements. UTCs must specialise in subjects that require technical and modern equipment, but they also all teach business skills and the use of information and communications technology (ICT). UTCs are also supposed to offer clear routes into higher education or further learning in work.

When operating, UTCs receive the same per capita funding as other schools in the local authority, calculated by the same formula, and £87 extra to cover UTC-specific administration.

The university technical college programme as a whole is sponsored by the Baker Dearing Educational Trust, which promotes the setting up of UTCs. The trust was co-founded by Kenneth Baker, a Conservative politician and former Secretary of State for Education and Ron Dearing. Each UTC pays an annual licence fee (£10,000 in 2019) to the trust. Baker Dearing's promotion of UTCs is supported by a range of organisations, including the Gatsby Charitable Foundation, the Peter Cundill Foundation, and the Garfield Weston Foundation. Many large companies have pledged to co-sponsor UTCs including Arup, British Airways, Ford, Jaguar Land Rover and Sony.

== List of UTCs ==
Name	Location	Sponsoring university	Opened
Aston University Engineering Academy	Birmingham	Aston University	2012
BMAT STEM Academy	Harlow, Essex	Anglia Ruskin University	2014
Aylesbury UTC	Aylesbury, Buckinghamshire	Buckinghamshire New University	2013
Cambridge Academy for Science and Technology	Cambridge	Cambridge University Health Partners	2014
Crewe Engineering and Design UTC	Crewe, Cheshire	Manchester Metropolitan University	2016
UTC Derby Pride Park	Derby	University of Derby	2015
Doncaster UTC	Doncaster	University of Sheffield and Sheffield Hallam University	2020
Elstree Screen Arts Academy	Borehamwood, Hertfordshire	University of Hertfordshire	2013
Brook Sixth Form and Academy	Dagenham, London Borough of Barking and Dagenham	University College London	2014
Energy Coast UTC	Workington, Cumbria	University of Cumbria	2014
Engineering UTC Northern Lincolnshire	Scunthorpe, Lincolnshire	University of Hull	2015
Global Academy	Hayes, London Borough of Hillingdon	University of the Arts London	2016
Greater Peterborough UTC	Peterborough, Cambridgeshire	Anglia Ruskin University	2016
UTC Heathrow	Northwood, London Borough of Hillingdon	Brunel University London	2014 (as Heathrow Aviation Engineering UTC)
JCB Academy	Rocester, Staffordshire	Harper Adams University	2010
The Leigh UTC	Dartford, Kent	University of Greenwich	2014
Lincoln UTC	Lincoln	University of Lincoln	2014
Liverpool Life Sciences UTC	Liverpool	University of Liverpool	2013
London Design and Engineering UTC	Royal Docks, London Borough of Newham	University of East London	2016
Mulberry UTC	Bow, London Borough of Tower Hamlets	Goldsmiths, University of London	2017
North East Futures UTC	Newcastle upon Tyne	University of Sunderland	2018
Ron Dearing UTC	Hull	University of Hull	2017
Scarborough UTC	Scarborough, North Yorkshire	University of Hull	2016
SGS Berkeley Green UTC	Berkeley, South Gloucestershire	University of Gloucestershire	2017
Silverstone UTC	Silverstone Circuit, Northamptonshire	University of Northampton	2013
South Devon UTC	Newton Abbot, Devon	University of Plymouth	2015
South Wiltshire UTC	Salisbury, Wiltshire	University of Southampton	2015
Thomas Telford UTC	Wolverhampton	University of Wolverhampton	2015 (as West Midlands Construction UTC)
University Collegiate School	Bolton, Greater Manchester	University of Bolton	2015
University Technical College Norfolk	Norwich	University of East Anglia	2014
UTC Leeds	Hunslet, Leeds	University of Leeds	2016
UTC Oxfordshire	Didcot, Oxfordshire	University of Reading	2015
UTC Plymouth	Plymouth, Devon	University of Plymouth	2013
UTC Portsmouth	Portsmouth	University of Portsmouth	2017
UTC Reading	Reading, Berkshire	University of Reading	2013
UTC Sheffield City Centre	Sheffield, South Yorkshire	Sheffield Hallam University	2013
UTC Sheffield Olympic Legacy Park	Sheffield, South Yorkshire	Sheffield Hallam University	2016
UTC South Durham	Newton Aycliffe, County Durham	University of Sunderland	2016
UTC Swindon	Swindon	Oxford Brookes University	2014
UTC Warrington	Warrington, Cheshire	University of Chester	2016
UTC@MediaCityUK	Salford, Greater Manchester	University of Salford	2015
Waterfront UTC	Chatham, Kent	University of Greenwich	2015 (as Medway UTC)
WMG Academy for Young Engineers, Coventry	Coventry	University of Warwick	2014
WMG Academy for Young Engineers, Solihull	Solihull	University of Warwick	2016

=== Planned UTCs ===
It was announced in August 2023 that two more UTCs would be established, in Doncaster and Southampton. In a review of the free school programmes in 2025 by the Department for Education, the Southampton UTC was listed as "minded to cancel", while the Doncaster UTC was listed as "continue in pre-opening".

=== Closed UTCs ===
Name	Location	Sponsoring university	Opened	Closed
Black Country UTC	Walsall, West Midlands	University of Wolverhampton	2011	2015
UTC Central Bedfordshire	Houghton Regis, Bedfordshire	Cranfield University	2012	2016
Daventry University Technical College	Daventry, Northamptonshire	University of Northampton	2013	2017
Greater Manchester University Technical College	Oldham, Greater Manchester	University of Bolton	2014	2017
Hackney University Technical College	London Borough of Hackney	University of East London	2012	2015
UTC@Harbourside	Newhaven, East Sussex	University of Brighton	2015	2019
UTC Lancashire	Burnley, Lancashire	University of Central Lancashire	2013	2017
Sir Simon Milton Westminster UTC	City of Westminster, London	University of Westminster	2017	2022
South Wiltshire UTC	Salisbury	University of Southampton	2015	2020
Watford UTC	Watford, Hertfordshire	University of Hertfordshire	2014	2023
University Technical College Wigan	Wigan, Greater Manchester	University of Central Lancashire	2013	2019

=== Converted away from traditional UTC model ===
Name	Location	Sponsoring university	Opened	Converted	New status
Bristol Technology and Engineering Academy	Stoke Gifford, South Gloucestershire	University of the West of England	2013	2022	UTC Sleeve
Royal Greenwich UTC	Royal Borough of Greenwich	University of Greenwich	2013	2016	11–19 free school
South Bank Engineering UTC	London Borough of Lambeth	London South Bank University	2016	2023	16-19 Academy
Tottenham University Technical College	London Borough of Haringey	Middlesex University	2014	2017	16-19 free school

== See also ==
- Academy school
- City Technology College
- Free school
- Studio school
- TVEI
- Maths school
- Career and technical education (United States)
