= Ronald Dearing, Baron Dearing =

British civil servant (1930–2009)

The Right Honourable The Lord Dearing CB HonFREng
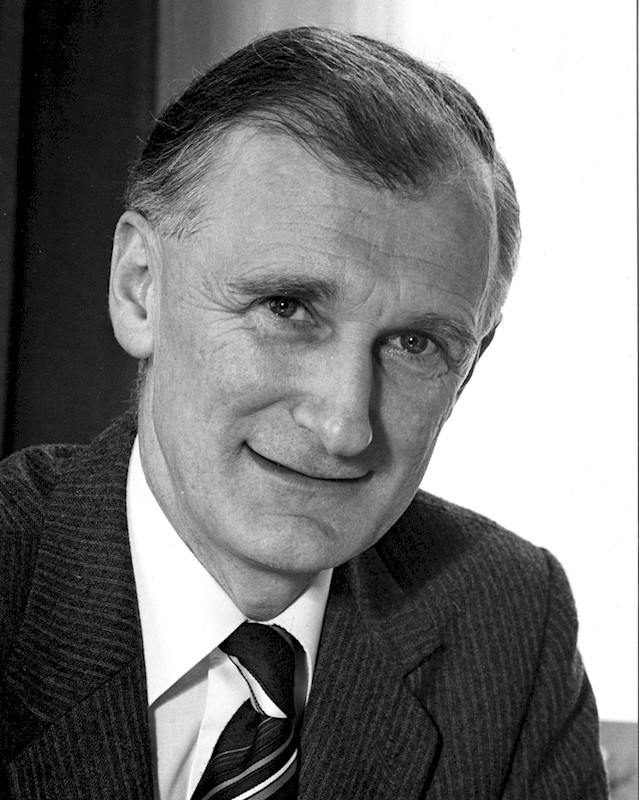
- Born: Ronald Ernest Dearing; 27 July 1930; Kingston upon Hull, East Riding of Yorkshire, England
- Died: 19 February 2009 (aged 78)
- Education: Malet Lambert Grammar School; University of Hull (BSc)
- Spouse: Margaret Patricia Riley (m. 1954)
- Children: 2

Member of the House of Lords
- Lord Temporal
- Life peerage 13 February 1998 – 19 February 2009

Ronald Ernest Dearing, Baron Dearing, CB HonFREng (27 July 1930 – 19 February 2009) was a senior civil servant before becoming chairman and chief executive of the Post Office Ltd.

== Early life ==
Dearing attended Willerby Carr Lane County Primary School before going on to Malet Lambert Grammar School. At the University of Hull, he gained a Bachelor of Science (BSc) degree in economics in 1954 during a two-year break from the Ministry of Power.

== Career ==
Dearing joined the civil service as a 16-year-old clerical officer in 1946. By 1967, aged 37, he was one of the two deputy heads of the coal division of the Ministry of Power, with the rank of assistant secretary.

In 1967, Dearing had responsibility for two major issues arising from the 1966 Aberfan disaster, in which a huge coal waste tip collapsed onto the town of Aberfan in Wales, killing 144 people including 116 school children. Dearing briefed the then minister, Richard Marsh, on the question of the possible removal of Lord Robens as chair of the National Coal Board in the wake of the damning Davies Report, which found the Coal Board wholly responsible for the disaster, and on the issue of the removal of the remaining tips above the town. He became North East regional director of the Department of Trade and Industry in 1972.

He was chairman and chief executive of the Post Office Board from 1980 and 1987 and chairman of the Council for National Academic Awards (CNAA) from 1987 to 1988.

He was chairman of Ufi Ltd between 1998 and 2001, and their Sheffield-based head office is named Dearing House after him.

In 2009, just before his death, Dearing co-founded with Kenneth Baker the Baker Dearing Educational Trust, a charity made to support university technical colleges in England.

== University of Nottingham ==
He was later the fifth Chancellor of the University of Nottingham (1993–2000) and the author of the Dearing Report into Higher Education. The annual teaching awards at Nottingham (initiated in 1999) are named after Lord Dearing, as is a more recent series of teaching fellowships. The main education building on the Jubilee Campus is also named after him. The name Dearing Report is also applied to the 2001 report which he chaired: "The Way Ahead: Church of England schools in the new millennium".

== Personal life ==
He married Margaret Patricia Riley in 1954.

== Recognition ==
In the 1979 New Year Honours, Dearing was appointed to the Order of the Bath as a Companion (CB). In the 1984 Birthday Honours, he was knighted and the Queen conferred the honour upon him on 21 August 1984. In 1992, he was elected an Honorary Fellow of the Royal Academy of Engineering.

In the 1998 New Year Honours, he was announced to be a life peer becoming Baron Dearing, of Kingston upon Hull in the County of the East Riding of Yorkshire.

In 2000, Lord Dearing visited Malet Lambert School Language College, Kingston upon Hull, to open a new building constructed for the use of science and geography, it being named the Dearing Centre. Similarly, in 2004, he visited Hymers College, Kingston upon Hull, where he opened the new science block with the purpose of educating the children in the areas of physics and chemistry. The Dearing Building on the University of Nottingham's Jubilee Campus is named after this former chancellor of the university.

== Notes ==
Academic offices
Preceded by Sir Gordon Hobday	Chancellor of the University of Nottingham; 1993–2000	Succeeded by Fujia Yang
