= Baker Dearing Educational Trust =

Educational charity in the United Kingdom

- Abbreviation: Baker Dearing Trust (BDT)
- Formation: 2009; 17 years ago
- Founders: Kenneth Baker and Ronald Dearing
- Type: Education charity
- Legal status: Registered Charity; Company Limited by Guarantee
- Headquarters: 1 The Sanctuary, London, SW1P 3JT
- Location: London, United Kingdom
- Chairman: Kenneth Baker
- Chief Executive: Simon Connell
- Staff: <10
- Website: https://bakerdearing.org

The Baker Dearing Educational Trust (abbreviated as the Baker Dearing Trust or BDT) is a UK-based registered charity established to support, advocate and develop university technical colleges (UTCs) in England. An official partnership with the Department for Education has been made for this purpose. All schools with UTC status must have a licence agreement with the BDT as it is the creator and owner of the UTC model, trademarks and brand. This agreement is fulfilled via a license fee.

== History ==
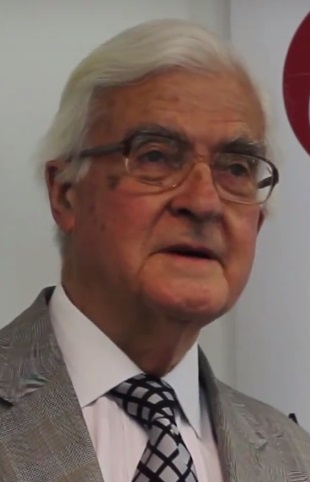
BDT co-founder and chair Kenneth Baker in 2015

Lords Kenneth Baker and Ronald Dearing conceptualised the UTC in 2009 and established the trust in the same year. Baker had previously served as Secretary of State for Education from 1986 to 1989, during which time he introduced the National Curriculum and City Technology College through the Education Reform Act 1988. Dearing died in February 2009 but he and Baker's ideas were approved by education minister Andrew Adonis of the Labour Party and the incoming Conservative-Lib Dem coalition. The first UTC opened in 2010 and further expansion soon followed.

Since then, the trust has been tasked by the Department for Education to oversee the UTC programme. It aids UTCs in deciding their curricular provision and technical qualifications (of which they specialise) and also helps open more UTCs. This is provided through a partnership with the department which is reviewed per annum. Baker has used this to promote the programme and influence the government's education policy, introducing the Baker Clause to the Technical and Further Education Act 2017. This clause requires schools to provide all pupils in years Year 8 to Year 13 access to a non-academic careers adviser. These advisers are expected to discuss UTCs with pupils, promoting them whilst doing so. Many schools have failed to follow the clause, resulting in threats of legal action from Baker. The trust has also attempted to introduce a technical baccalaureate with Andrew Adonis. From 2012 to 2019 the trust's chief executive was Charles Parker. Upon his resignation he was replaced by Simon Connell. Parker has remained in the trust as an adviser to its senior management.

== Support ==
The trust has seen continued political and academic support, with the board of trustees having included Labour's Kumar Bhattacharyya and Andrew Adonis and educators such as Kevin Satchwell, Edwina Dunn and Mike Tomlinson. Other supporters include Conservative education secretary Gavin Williamson, astronaut Tim Peake, physicist Brian Cox, Rear Admiral John Clink and lords Peter Mandelson and David Puttnam. An eight-member independent policy group of MPs co-chaired by Kenneth Baker and Robert Halfon has been established to aid the trust and enforce the Baker Clause.

== Research ==
The trust conducts research into UTCs, often comparing them to mainstream schools. This research appears to typically favour UTCs and often clashes with the Department for Education's official data. BDT chair Kenneth Baker claims that this is because the official data is outdated by two years and disregards exam results from students taking a level 2 qualification or lower.
