= Thomas Abbott =

Thomas Abbott may refer to:

- Thomas Eastoe Abbott (1786–1854), English poet
- Thomas Abbott (priest), Irish priest, archdeacon of Cloyne, 1919–1936
- Thomas Kingsmill Abbott (1829–1913), Irish scholar and educator

== See also ==
- Tom Abbott (born 1981), British broadcaster and sports commentator
- Tom Abbott (socialist) (1872–1949), British socialist activist
- Tommy Abbott (1934–1987), American actor, dancer, and choreographer
