= Dereham =

Town in Norfolk, England

Coordinates: 52.681°N 0.940°E

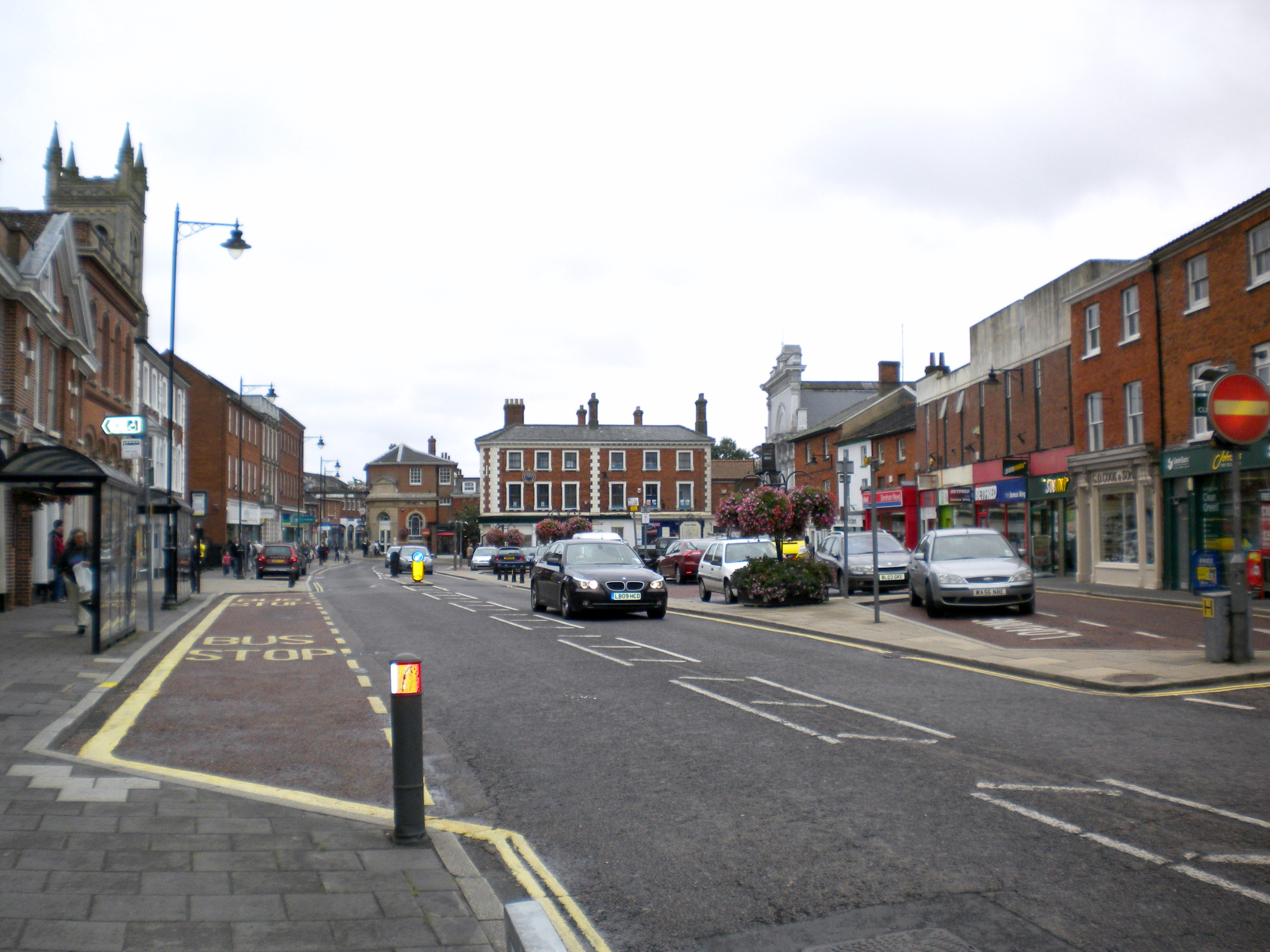
- The market place on High Street

- Location within Norfolk
- Area: 21.51 km^{2} (8.31 sq mi)
- Population: 19,256 (2021 Census)
  - Density: 895/km^{2} (2,320/sq mi)
- OS grid reference: TF988132
- District: Breckland
- Shire county: Norfolk
- Region: East
- Country: England
- Sovereign state: United Kingdom
- Post town: DEREHAM
- Postcode district: NR19, NR20
- Dialling code: 01362
- Police: Norfolk
- Fire: Norfolk
- Ambulance: East of England
- UK Parliament: Mid Norfolk

Dereham (/ˈdɪərəm/), also known historically as East Dereham, is a town and civil parish in the Breckland District of the English county of Norfolk. It is situated on the A47 road, about 15 miles (24 km) west of the city of Norwich and 25 miles (40 km) east of King's Lynn.

The civil parish has an area of 8.31 mi^{2} (21.5 km^{2}) and, in the 2001 census, had a population of 15,659 in 6,941 households; it increased to 18,609 by the 2011 census. Dereham falls within, and is the centre of administration for, Breckland District Council. The town should not be confused with the Norfolk village of West Dereham, which lies about 25 miles (40 km) away.

Since 1983, Dereham has been twinned with the town of Rüthen in North Rhine-Westphalia, Germany. It is also twinned with Caudebec-lès-Elbeuf, France. In spite of the reunification of Germany in 1990, until 2024, the sign on the A47 at the entrance to Dereham from the Swaffham direction still referred to Rüthen being in West Germany; this sparked periodic comment in the local press.

"Deerum"; "Dareum" (the emphasis is placed upon the vowel in the first syllable).

== History ==
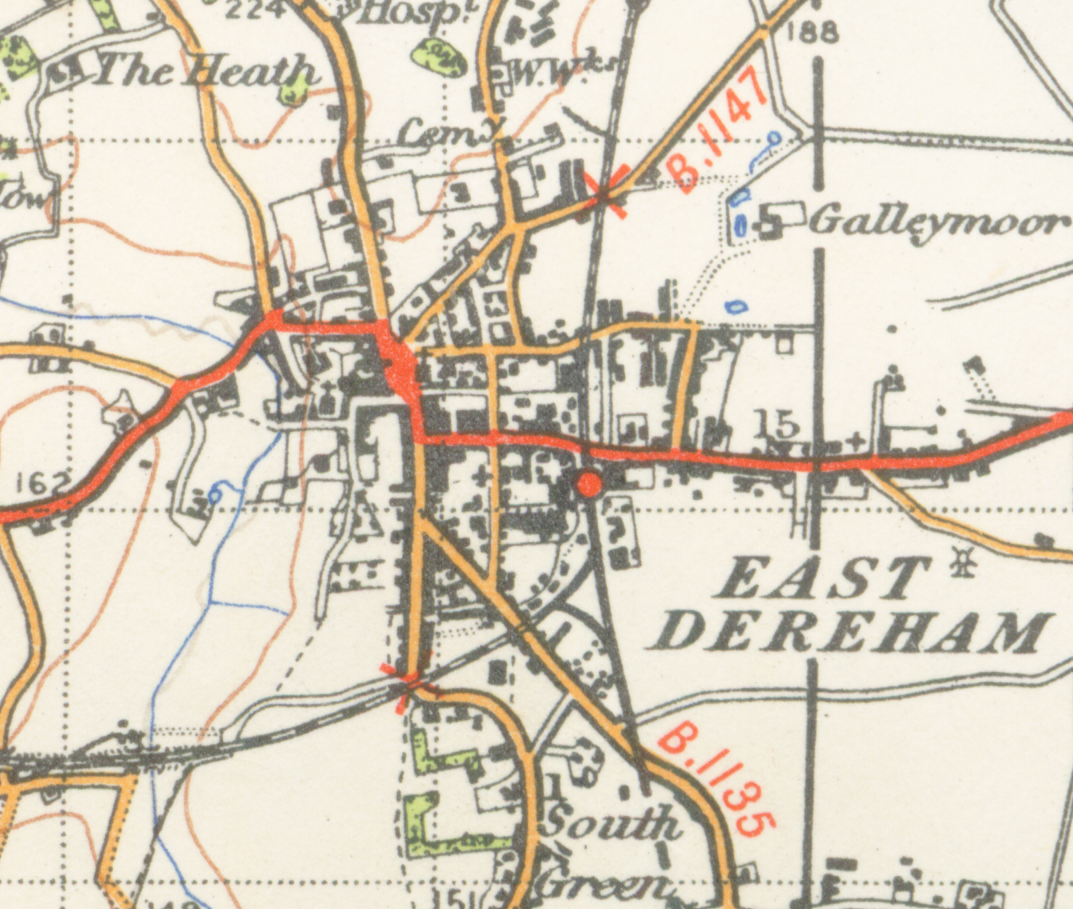
A map of Dereham from 1946

=== Early history ===
Dereham's name derives from the Old English word "deor" meaning "deer" or "wild animal" with the very common "-ham" ("village", "homestead", or to denote land that is closed in by water or other geographical features), so perhaps it referred to a place where deer or other animals were kept or grazed.

According to local tradition, Saint Wihtburh (aka Withburga), claimed to be the daughter of Anna, King of the East Angles, founded a monastery there in the seventh century after seeing a vision of the Virgin Mary, although the Venerable Bede does not mention her, or her monastery, in his writings, despite reporting the story of her more famous sister Æthelthryth /Etheldreda of Ely. Apart from reference to it in the eleventh-century hagiography of Wihtburh, little is known of her foundation and no evidence survives today.

An archaeological report by Norfolk County Council indicates that the first "documentary evidence" of a settlement in this area is a reference in one of the versions of the Anglo-Saxon Chronicle to the exhumation of the remains of St Wihtburh in AD 798, said to be 55 years after her death but that reference is an eleventh-century addition to the Chronicle. Nonetheless, there is evidence for an early ecclesiastical site at Dereham. The Domesday Book of 1086 states that in the eleventh century, "St Etheldreda held Dereham that was already an important market centre with three mills". The report adds that the growing community was centred around St. Nicholas Church, from the Norman era; the structure was altered during the 1200s, 1300s and 1400s. Because numerous medieval buildings were destroyed in fires during 1581 and 1679, the town appears to have a Georgian aspect.

A Neolithic polished greenstone axe head was found near the town in 1986, with another Neolithic axe head, flint scraper and other tools and worked flints also found in local fields during the 1980s. There is evidence that the area was occupied during the Bronze Age, with burnt flints from a pot boiler site being found in 1976 and another burnt mound site located in 1987.

In 2000, an enamelled bridle bit dating from the Iron Age was discovered, with pottery sherds also being found by field walkers in 1983. The town is believed to be on the Roman Road linking the Brampton with the major east-west Roman Road of the Fen Causeway. Some pottery and furniture remains have been found in local fields.

In 2004, the largest number of Roman coins found in Norfolk was discovered in Dereham, over 1000 from the third century. A dig provided no evidence of Roman occupation, however.

Edmund Bonner, later to become the infamous 'burning bishop', was the Rector for Dereham from 1534 to 1538. Many of the town's ancient buildings were destroyed in the serious fires that took place in 1581 and 1659. Notable buildings that survived the fire include the Church of Saint Nicholas and the nearby Bishop Bonner's cottage. Dereham was administered by the Abbots, then the Bishops of Ely, until the parish was taken from the church by Queen Elizabeth I.

=== Napoleonic conflict ===
In the late 1700s, Dereham church's bell tower was used as a prison for French prisoners of war being transferred from Great Yarmouth to Norman Cross under the charge of the East Norfolk Militia. On 6 October 1799, a French officer, Jean de Narde, managed to escape from the tower and, being unable to escape from the church yard due to guards being present, hid in a tree. The Frenchman was spotted and shot when he refused to come down and surrender. Jean is buried in the churchyard and his grave is marked by a memorial stone erected in 1858, which includes the following statement: "Once our foes but now our allies and brethren." This story is told in the documentary, The Shooting of Jean DeNarde. Jean de Narde's link with Dereham is commemorated by a road named for him just off the B1146 as one approaches the town from the north.

One of the windmills built during this era, the Grade II Listed East Dereham Windmill (built in 1836) was known as the Norwich Road Mill or Fendick's Mill; it was constructed by James Hardy for Michael Hardy who owned a smock mill at Bittering. The windmill continued to use wind power until 1922 when it was converted to use engine power. The facility closed in 1937. It was restored and reopened as an exhibition centre in 2013.

==== Dereham Rifle Volunteer Corps ====
In June 1859, a public meeting was held at the Corn Exchange for the formation of a Dereham Rifle Volunteer Corps. The Reverend Armstrong made a short speech urging people to join; around thirty men did, the eldest was an elderly fat banker of 70 years and the youngest a seventeen-year-old. They were kitted out in a grey uniform. The Corps met regularly for drill and exercise. When the Prince and Princess of Wales, and the Queen of Denmark arrived at the town's railway station, the Dereham Rifles attended to form a guard of honour.

William Earle G. Lytton Bulwer, formerly a lieutenant and captain in the Scots Fusilier Guards, was commanding the Dereham Corps in 1861. Dereham became the headquarters of 1st Administrative Battalion, Norfolk Rifle Volunteers in 1866. The Quebec Street drill hall opened that year, and the Right Hon. Lord Suffield was appointed Honorary Colonel on 18 May 1866.

=== First World War ===
At the outbreak of war, the 5th Battalion, Norfolk Regiment, kept their HQ in Quebec Street but were based in the Corn Exchange, and used the Masonic Hall on Norwich Road as a store, with the Assembly Rooms being used for medical inspections.

Dereham suffered damage during a Zeppelin air raid during the night of 8 September 1915. Damaged buildings included the headquarters of the 5th Norfolk Regiment at their premises on the corner of Church Street and Quebec Street. The raid also hit The White Lion public house on Church Street, seriously injuring two customers. The roof was destroyed and The White Lion never reopened as a public house. The old Vicarage was used as a Red Cross hospital.

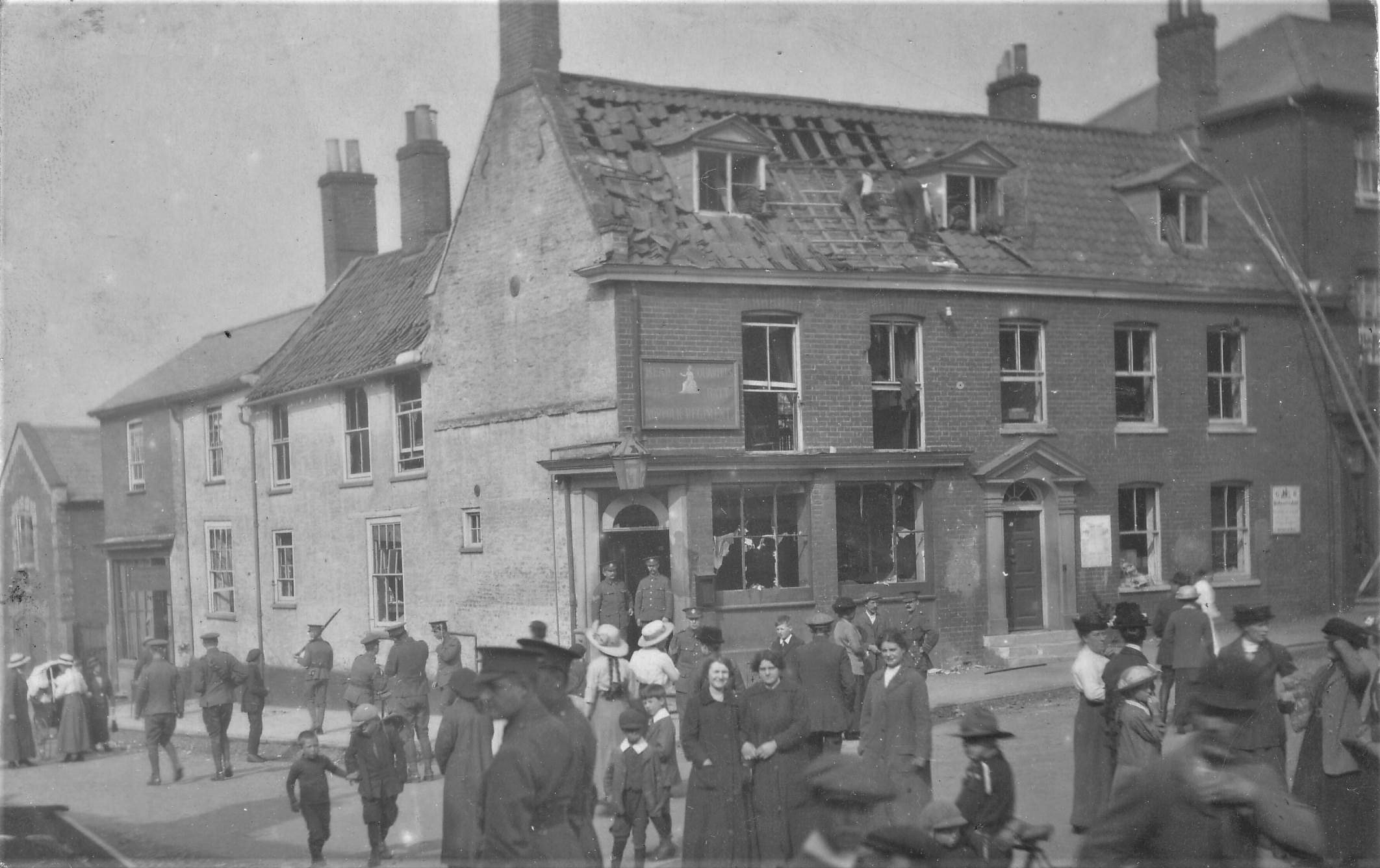
Locals view the damage after the 1915 Zeppelin raid on Dereham, Norfolk

In December 1915, Zeppelin L14 dropped bombs between Bylaugh Park and Dereham. Seventy-five bombs were dropped on Dereham, with several houses destroyed and eight or nine bombs dropped onto the Red Cross hospital established in the vicarage, although these failed to detonate. Another bomb hit the guildhall and destroyed windows in the church. Four people were killed and six injured during the raid, with the coroner's report stating that the deaths were caused by bombs "unlawfully dropped from a Zeppelin aircraft."

=== World War II ===
Dereham was declared a Nodal Point during the Second World War and was partially fortified to slow down any German invasion of the country. Several defensive structures were built. One surviving pill box, in the railway station yard, is preserved as a memorial by the Royal British Legion; several others were built but are no longer visible. Additional Air Ministry sidings were laid in the town in 1943.

A Cold War-era bunker was built underground near the Guild Hall.

=== 1969 Phantom air incident ===
On 25 March 1969 a USAF McDonnell Douglas F-4 Phantom II (F4-C) suffered a flight control system failure at 15,000 ft. The flight controls were now jammed, and the aircraft entered a steep dive.

The WSO, Captain Mike Hinnebusch, ejected at 5,000 ft, but the pilot ejected later, when the aircraft was now at supersonic speed. The pilot's parachute opened two seconds before the aircraft hit the ground. The pilot, Captain Kristian Michael Mineau, born 26 November 1941 from Worcester, Massachusetts, survived but the supersonic ejection caused all of his four limbs to be shattered. Supersonic ejection is not always survivable. The pilot was taken by helicopter to the Norfolk and Norwich Hospital, and the less-injured WSO was taken by ambulance to the hospital. Captain Mineau died on 5 September 2022; his son David A. Mineau is (January 2026) in command of the Twelfth Air Force.

The aircraft was from the 78th Tactical Fighter Squadron at RAF Bentwaters. The aircraft caused a 50 ft deep crater, with some components being found at 75 feet depth.

=== Railways ===
The railway arrived in Dereham in 1847, when a single track line to Wymondham opened. A second line was opened, in 1848, to King's Lynn. A line from Dereham to Fakenham was opened in 1849; this line being extended to the coastal town of Wells-next-the-Sea by 1857. The town's railways became part of the Great Eastern Railway in 1862. Dereham had its own railway depot and a large complex of sidings, serving local industry. The line between Dereham and Wymondham was doubled, in 1882, to allow for the increasing levels of traffic.

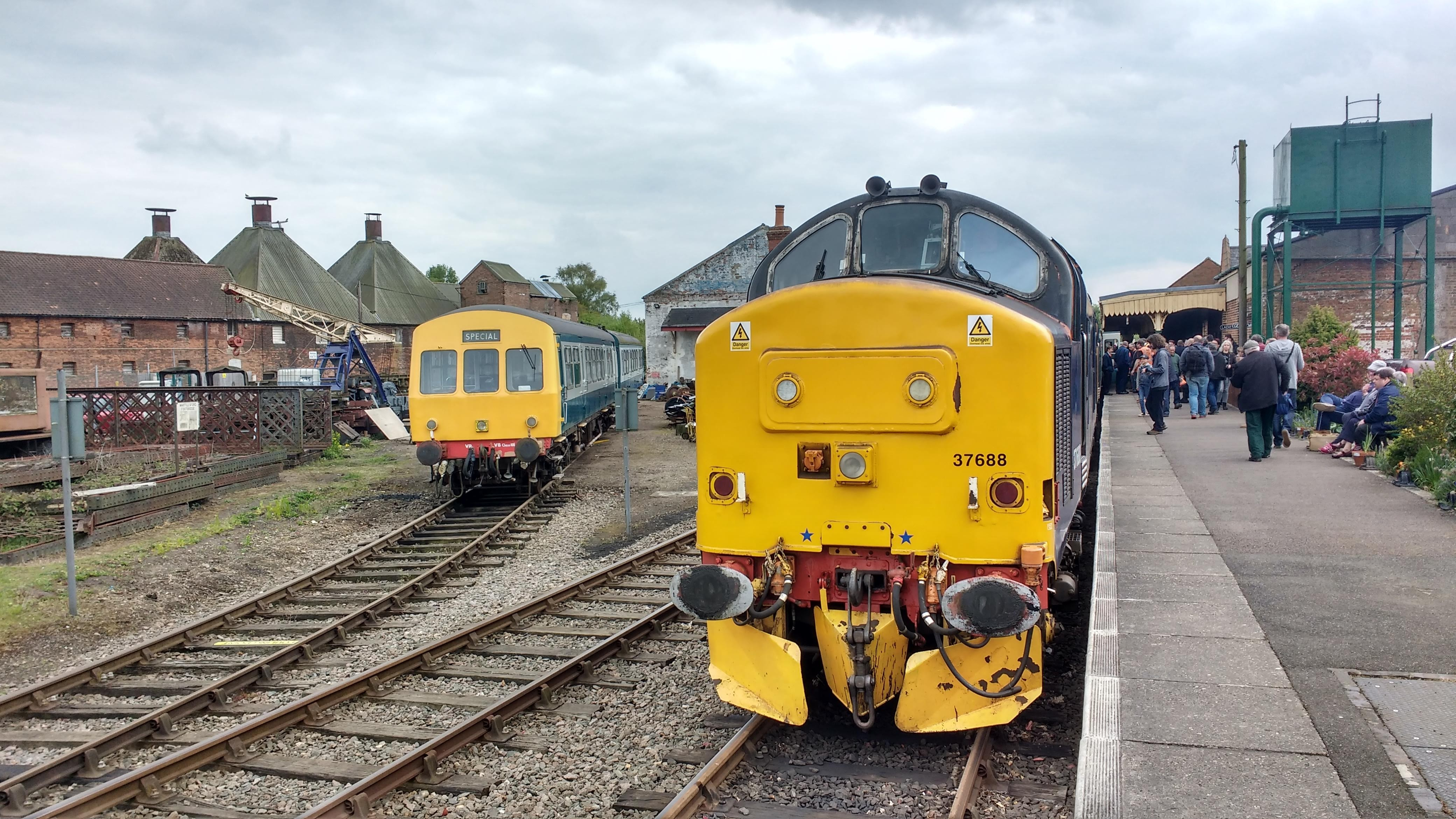
Trains at Dereham Station

Passenger services between Dereham and Wells were withdrawn in 1964 and the track between Fakenham and Wells was lifted soon after. The line from Dereham to Wymondham was returned to single track in 1965, with a passing loop at Hardingham. The line to King's Lynn was closed in 1968 and the last passenger train on the Dereham-to-Wymondham line ran in 1969, although the railway remained open for freight until 1989.

Dereham labels itself "The Heart of Norfolk" owing to its central location in the county, the Tesco car park being cited as the exact centre. In the spring of 1978, the "Heart" was given the seven-mile £5m part-dual-carriageway A47 bypass. A section of this road, between Scarning and Wendling, was built along the former railway line towards Swaffham and King's Lynn. This section of railway had been used as a location for the filming of Dad's Army, where Captain Mainwaring is left dangling from a railway bridge after a flight on a barrage balloon. Dereham railway station was also a filming location for the opening scene of the BBC's 2018 series Bodyguard.

== Transport ==
=== Roads ===
The A47 trunk road from Lowestoft to Birmingham once ran through the centre of the town, east to west. The A47 was re-routed in 1978 to form a seven miles (11 km) £5 million East Dereham by-pass, consisting of a section of dual carriageway approaching Dereham from the east, and to the west a single carriageway built on the disused railway line to King's Lynn, by-passing the villages of Wendling and Scarning. Three other significant roads intersect at Dereham; the B1146 connects the town northwards to Fakenham, the A1075 connects it to Watton and Thetford to the south-west, and the B1135 runs south-east to Wymondham.

=== Cycling ===
National Cycle Route 13 runs through Dereham, joining with National Cycle Route 1 north of the town.

=== Buses ===
Frequent bus services operate from Dereham to Norwich and Peterborough; less frequent services are provided for several local villages. Dereham does not have a bus station, with most services operating through the marketplace.

=== Railway ===
Dereham is not currently served by National Rail services. The nearest station is Wymondham, which is on the Breckland line between Norwich and Cambridge.

==== Heritage railway ====
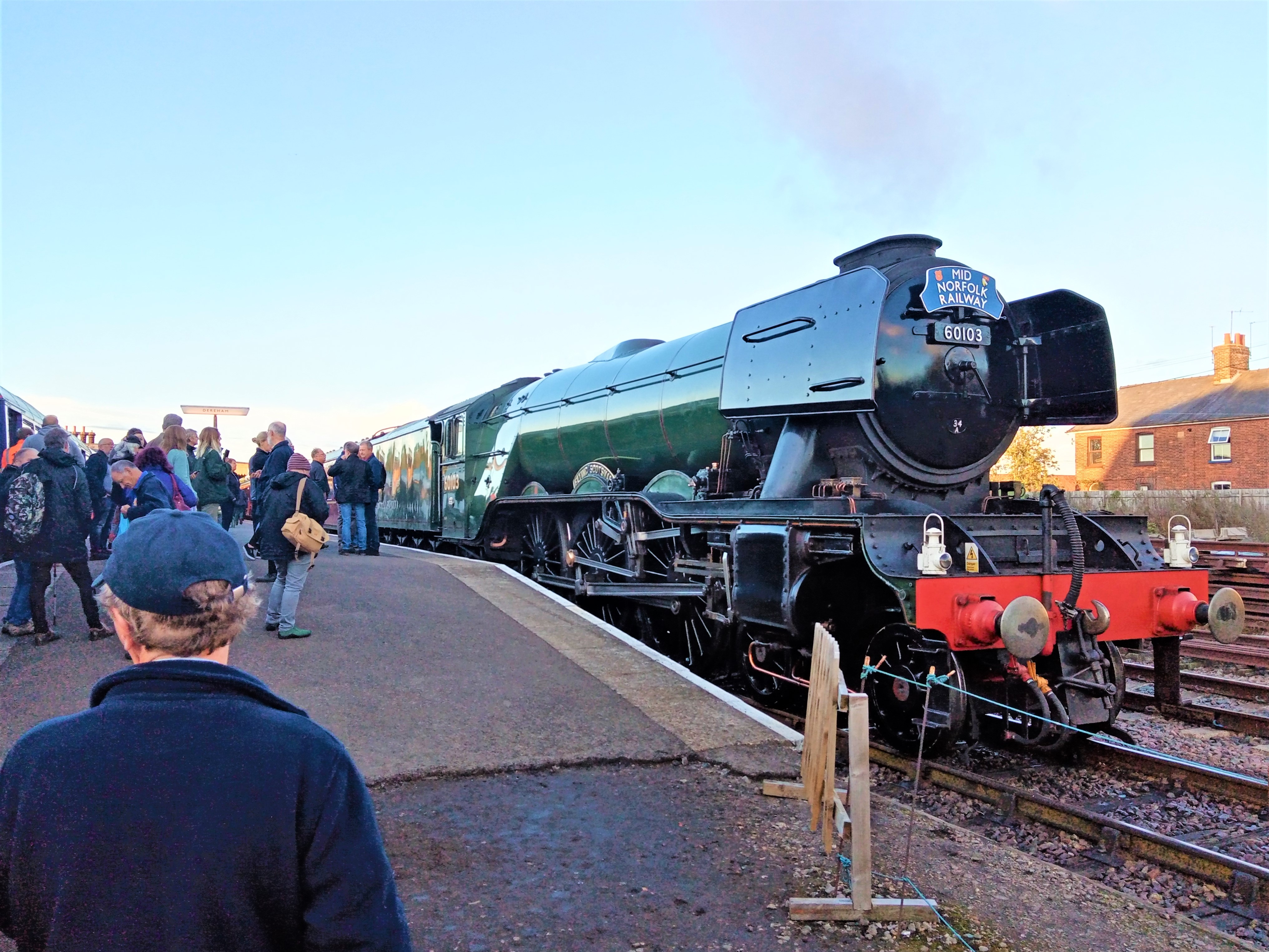
The Flying Scotsman at Dereham station on the Mid-Norfolk Railway

There is presently no regular service between Dereham and Norwich, but the section of railway between Wymondham, Dereham and County School, described earlier in the History section, has been preserved and is now operated between Wymondham and Worthing as a tourist line by the Mid-Norfolk Railway Preservation Trust. This charitable company is gradually reopening the line through North Elmham and supports the restoration of the line to Fakenham. As well as running heritage trains, the MNR also runs special attractions such as the Polar Express Train Ride every winter and operate non-passenger services in support of mainline companies.

Although no scheduled services operate between Dereham and the rest of the national network, in June 2009 the Association of Train Operating Companies published a document (Connecting Communities: Expanding Access to the Rail Network) calling for the restoration of services on a variety of former branch lines, including the Dereham branch. This £30m proposal would see regular services restored between Dereham and Norwich, operated subject to agreement with the Mid-Norfolk Railway Preservation Trust.

In 2020, the railway announced that they had, in association with partner organisations including Greater Anglia, Norfolk County Council, Breckland District Council and the New Anglia Local Enterprise Partnership, bid for funding for a feasibility study into reopening the line for regular commuter services over their route. The plans to restore the line, and potentially extend it to Fakenham in time, have been backed by the George Freeman, MP for Mid-Norfolk. In June 2021, an unsuccessful funding bid was submitted as part of the second round of the Restoring Your Railway fund. A bid was re-submitted for the third round

== Saint Withburga's Well ==
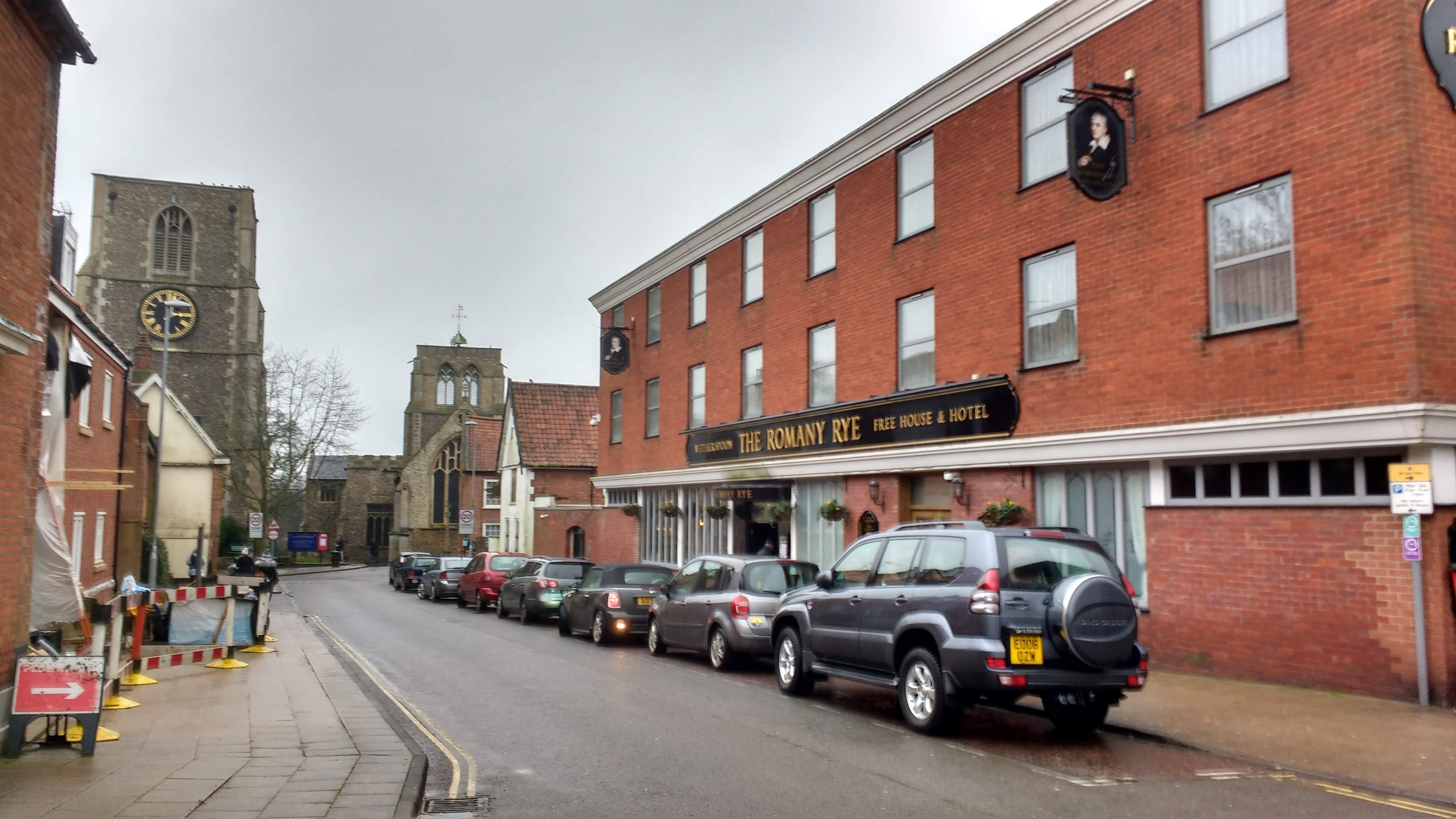
East Dereham, showing the two towers of St Nicholas Church. The left tower is the belltower

The town lies on the site of a monastery said by local tradition to have been founded by Saint Withburga in the seventh century; the saint died in 743AD. A holy well is at the western end of St Nicholas Church yard and the tradition claims this to have begun to flow when her body was stolen from the town by monks from Ely, who took the remains back to their town.

An attempt was made in 1752 to turn Dereham into a new Buxton or Bath by building a bathhouse over Withburga's Well. It was described at the time as a "hideous building of brick and plaster" and was never popular. The building was extensively modified in 1793 according to a book published in 1856.

The local vicar, Reverend Benjamin Armstrong, obtained permission in 1880 to pull the building down. The spring was then protected by iron railings but fell out of use and became choked with weeds. Since 1950, however, it has been kept clear of weeds, although the railings still prevent access to the waters. In a 2006 report on the church, Simon Knott indicated that by then, the "well" was actually a "sunken spring".

Today, the Church of England refers to St Nicholas Church as "Founded by St Withburga AD654", presumably because it may be on the same site as the monastery and convent she was said to have founded. The church has been a Grade I listed structure since 1951 (Entry #1077067).

== Governance ==
There are three tiers of local government covering Dereham, at parish (town), district and county level: Dereham Town Council, Breckland District Council and Norfolk County Council. The town council is responsible for matters such as play areas, allotments, cemeteries and markets. Its assets include Dereham Memorial Hall, Neatherd Moor, Bishop Bonners Cottage, two cemeteries and six allotment sites. The town council is based at the Assembly Rooms on Rüthen Place in the town centre.

The district council also has its headquarters in Dereham, at Elizabeth House on Walpole Loke on the outskirts of the town.

East Dereham was an ancient parish. Until 1877 it was governed by its vestry in the same way as most rural areas. In 1877 the parish was made a local government district, governed by a local board. Such districts were reconstituted as urban districts in 1894.

East Dereham Urban District was abolished in 1974, becoming part of the new Breckland District. A successor parish was established covering the former urban district. The parish was formally renamed from East Dereham to just Dereham with effect from 24 June 1991.

== Industry and employment ==
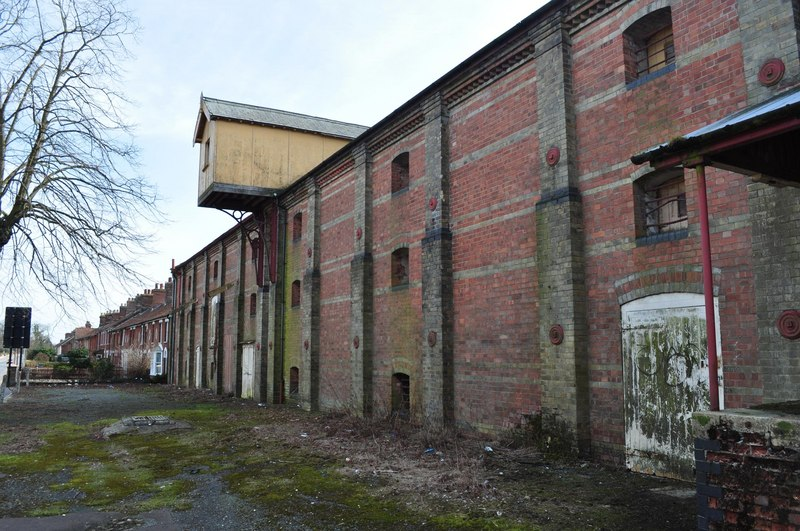
The maltings complex beside the railway, closed in 2000.

Dereham was the home to the "Jentique" furniture factory which made boxes for both instruments and bombs during the Second World War. The town was also the home to the Metamec clock factory, an offshoot of Jentique, founded in 1941.

Hobbies of Dereham produced plans, kits and tools—including their famous treadle fretwork saws—for making wooden models and toys, which were popular in the days before moulded plastic. At one point, Hobbies owned ten shops in prestige locations all over the UK. In the early 1960s the firm was taken over by Great Universal Stores, who sold the shops and closed the business. However, due to a shrewd management purchase of the "old traditional" parts of the firm, Hobbies rose again, limiting itself to the role of specialist model-makers shop. After nearly 40 years of its new lease of life, Hobbies moved out of Dereham to new premises elsewhere in Norfolk at Raveningham, where it still trades today.

Cranes of Dereham, and its successor the Fruehauf trailer company, was a major employer in the town for many decades. Cranes built nearly all the giant trailers (100 tons plus) that carried equipment such as transformers at slow speeds across the UK, usually in the livery of Wynns or Pickfords. The launch of a new trailer was treated rather like that of a ship with many people coming out to see the leviathan move through the narrow streets of the town towards the A47. The town also had several large maltings. Almost all this large-scale industry has drifted away since the 1980s.

In March 2015, Crisp Maltings announced that they intended to restore the maltings complex beside the station to operational condition, producing malt for craft beer, as part of a planning application for a major housing development. The restoration was expected to cost £1 million. In 2017, the plan to restore the Maltings was dropped, although the housing development was allowed to continue. As of 2020 the Maltings buildings have been made weathertight but they remain empty.

Companies currently based in Dereham include Flagship Housing and Zip Industries.

== Economy ==
Dereham is a busy market town serving local residents and a wide rural area. The town has a market on Tuesdays and Fridays selling a range of food and household items. The town's shops are a mixture of local independent businesses and national chains. The Market Place and the High Street were the traditional shopping areas but in 2005 a new shopping area was created called Wright's Walk which is mainly occupied by national chains.

A second phase of development at Wright's Walk was envisaged but this has never been started. Instead, the land earmarked for this development has been used to create a pocket park offering a tranquil public meeting space, a community garden and a performance area. Funding for the park came from a £15,000 grant from the Pocket Park Fund - part of the Ministry of Housing, Communities and Local Government and an equal sum from Breckland Council.

== Sport and leisure ==
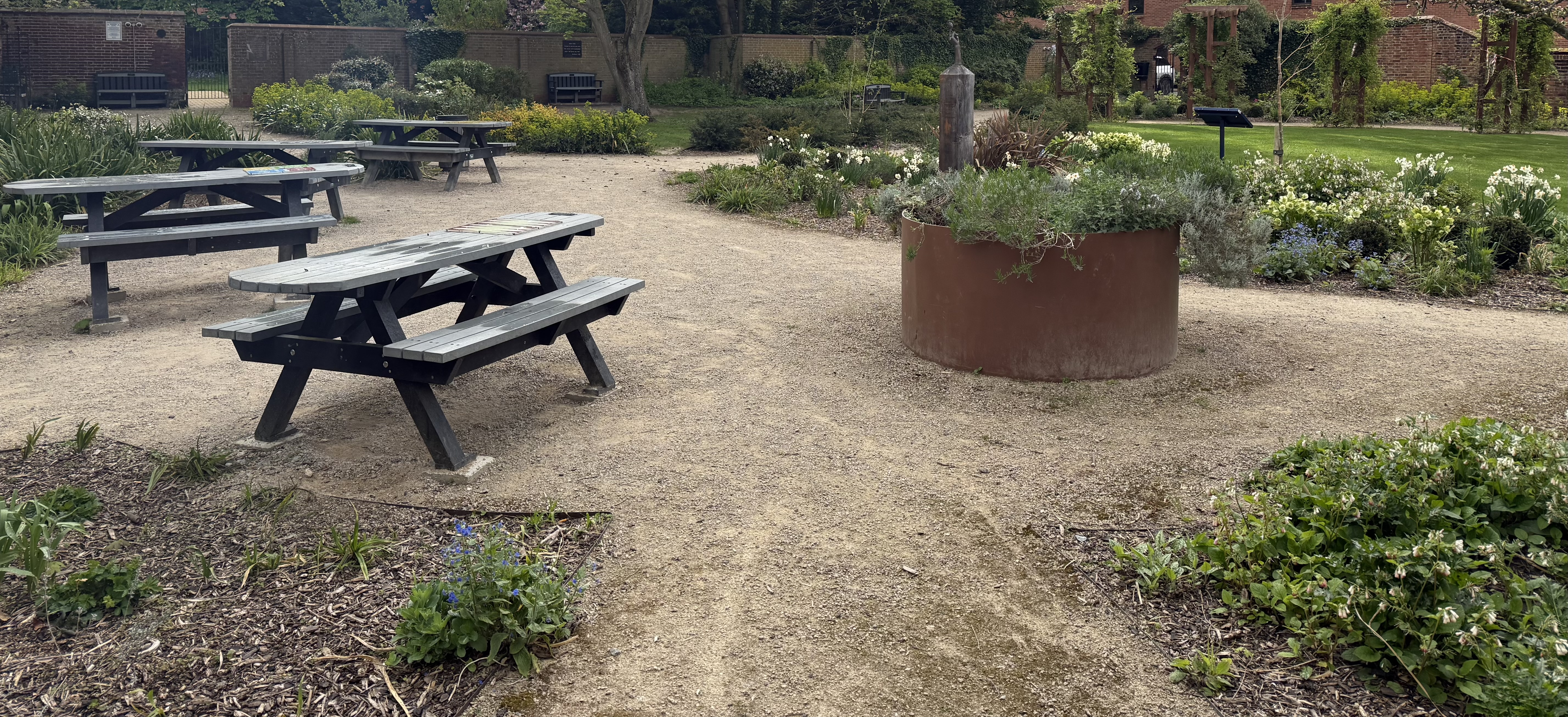
The Queen Mother's Garden, named after Queen Elizabeth the Queen Mother and opened by her in 1983

An area of former railway and industrial land, close to the town's station, now serves as the location for a number of sports and leisure facilities. The Dereham Leisure Centre, built on the old railway locomotive depot, has a swimming pool, gym, dance and sports facilities. Open air tennis courts, children's play equipment and a skate park are provided on the nearby Dereham recreation ground. Strikes also operate a ten-pin bowling alley on the site.

Dereham has a non-League football club, Dereham Town, who play at Aldiss Park. As of the 2025–26 season, the team plays in the Eastern Counties League Premier Division.

Dereham Town FC run the Dereham Education and Soccer Academy (DESA), a partnership between Northgate High School Sixth Form College and the football club. The programme allows students to follow a Level 3 BTEC in Sport, alongside A levels and/or GCSE Maths and English retakes while also being part of a football academy. Graduates of DESA include Colchester United midfielder Luke Hannant and Swindon Town left-back Frazer Blake-Tracy.

Dereham Rugby Club, based on Moorgate Road, play in the Woodfordes League.

Dereham Cricket Club was formed in 1856. It plays home games at its ground on Norwich Road. Dereham Hockey Club is based nearby on Greenfield Road.

In August each year, Dereham hosts a 5K race on a two-lap course around the town, which is organised by Dereham Runners. The first race was held in 2011.

Dereham featured on the 2012 Tour of Britain cycle race route during the first stage from Ipswich to the Norfolk Showground. The race entered the town from the Swanton Morley direction passing along Theatre Street, the Market Place and Norwich Street, before leaving town via Norwich Road and heading towards Mattishall.

A footpath from the town links with the Wensum Way at Gressenhall. This links to the Marriott's Way long-distance path to Norwich and Wroxham, and the Nar Valley Way to King's Lynn.

Neatherd Moor is an Urban Greenspace to the north-east of the town. It was designated as a County Wildlife Site in 2013. Historically, the moor was used for grazing and sourcing raw materials until the early 1800s. Today it is used by walkers and joggers and has a modern children's play area.

A further large open space is Dereham Rush Meadow, a 22.2 hectares (55 acres) biological Site of Special Scientific Interest to the north-west of the town.

In 2005, Dereham gained a new £2,000,000 library. The building is spread over two floors and features a sedum roof over a single storey area of the ground floor. The library is the second most used in Norfolk, after the Millennium Library in Norwich.

Dereham has a three-screen cinema housed in the former Corn Exchange building. The building also hosts a nightclub called Metro. The building has had many incarnations including as a music venue in the 1960s when a range of top bands played there. These included Small Faces, Cream, Pink Floyd, The Jeff Beck Group and The Jimi Hendrix Experience.

== Media ==
Local news and television programmes are provided by BBC East and ITV Anglia. Television signals are received from the Tacolneston TV transmitter.

Dereham's local radio stations are BBC Radio Norfolk, Heart East and Greatest Hits Radio East (formerly Radio Norwich 99.9).

The Dereham Times is the town's weekly local newspaper including the regional newspaper Eastern Daily Press.

== Youth and community provision ==
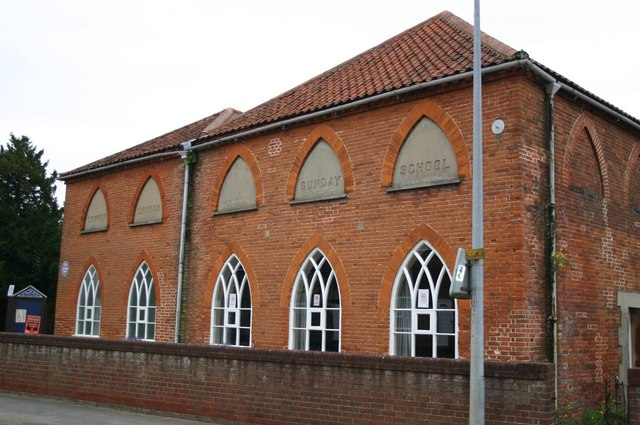
Cowper Church Sunday School

=== Schools ===
==== Nursery and pre-school ====
- East Dereham Day Nursery
- Magic Tree Day Nursery
- Scarning Pre-School
- Toftwood Nursery Pre-School

==== Infant and junior schools ====
- Dereham CE VA Infant School and Nursery
- Dereham Church of England Junior Academy
- Grove House Nursery and Infant Community School
- King's Park Infant School
- Scarning Primary School
- Toftwood Infant School
- Toftwood Junior School

==== Secondary schools ====
- Neatherd High School
- Northgate High School

==== Sixth form college ====
- Dereham Sixth Form College

==== Special School ====
- Fred Nicholson School

=== Youth groups ===
Dereham has two active Scout groups, both of which are part of The Scout Association. 1st Dereham was one of the earliest Groups in the world, having been formed in 1908. In the past, there was a 3rd Dereham Scout Group.

The town is the home of 1249 Squadron, Air Training Corps, who parade at the Cadet Centre on Norwich Road. The Army Cadets also parade at the same place.

Dereham is home to the youth theatre group DOSYTCo, which works with children to put on shows at the Dereham Memorial Hall, such as a 2015 production of Hairspray.

== Attractions ==
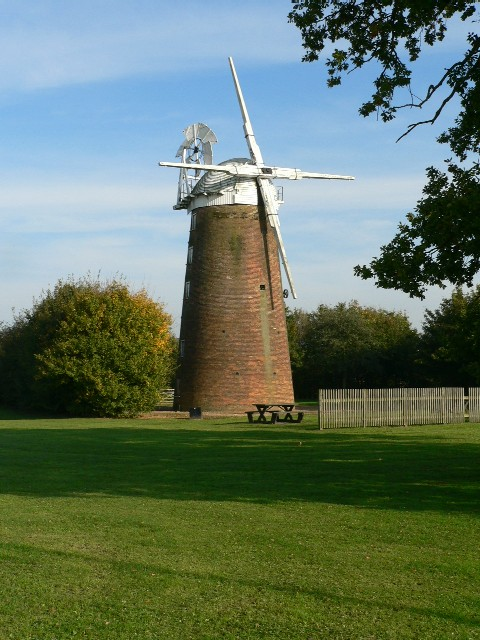
East Dereham Windmill

Notable buildings in the town include the pargetted Bishop Bonner's Cottage, built in the late 1500s; the Norman parish church; the East Dereham Windmill, which was extensively renovated in 2013; and a large mushroom-shaped water tower. The Gressenhall Museum of Rural Life is nearby.

The town also hosts the headquarters of the Mid-Norfolk Railway, which runs trains over an 11.5-mile railway south to Wymondham, as well as owning the line 6 miles north to North Elmham and County School Station.

A guide to attractions in and near Dereham, intended to promote tourism, was scheduled to be published in late March 2020.

== Dereham Blues Festival ==
Since 2013, Dereham has hosted an annual Blues Festival organised by The Norfolk Blues Society. The 2019 Festival saw 50 acts playing in 13 different venues which included pubs, clubs and unusual venues such as Dereham Cricket Club and the station at the Mid Norfolk Railway. All of the performances are free apart from the opening headline concert at Dereham Memorial Hall. Headline acts to date have been:

- 2013 Ron Sayer Jnr and the Dave Thomas Band
- 2014 Paul Jones
- 2015 Mud Morganfield
- 2016 Dr. Feelgood
- 2017 Andy Fairweather Low and The Low Riders
- 2018 Georgie Fame
- 2019 Hamilton Loomis
- 2022 When Rivers Meet and Kyla Brox
- 2023 Danielle Nicole
- 2024 Toby Lee

The 2020 Festival was due to run from 8 to 12 July, with the headline act being Mike Sanchez performing with his band The Portions. However the Festival was cancelled due to the Coronavirus pandemic. The 2021 festival was similarly aborted.

== Notable people ==
Notable people born in or associated with the town include:

- Thomas Eastoe Abbott, poet
- Brian Aldiss, novelist
- Chris Baker, high-jumper
- Michael Barton, cricketer
- George Borrow, author
- Bruce Bursford, cyclist
- Todd Cantwell, footballer
- Frederick Codd, architect
- John Craske, artist and fisherman
- Harry Cripps, footballer
- Reverend Lionel Fanthorpe, priest and entertainer
- Sir John Fenn, antiquarian
- Lady Ellenor Fenn, author
- John Grange, immunologist
- David Nicholls, cricketer
- Beth Orton, singer
- James Phillippo, abolitionist
- George Skipper, architect
- Freddie Steward, rugby union player
- Ken Thorne, composer
- Matthew Vassar, American brewer, merchant and philanthropist
- William Hyde Wollaston, scientist
- Henri Chopin, avant-garde poet and musician, lived out his later years and died in Dereham
- William Cowper, poet, died in Dereham and is buried in St Nicholas's Church, where there is a commemorative stained glass window
- David Fisher, Doctor Who scriptwriter lived in Dereham from 2001
- Stephen Fry, comedian and actor, married his partner Elliot Spencer in the town on 17 January 2015
- Mick Gault, English sport shooter and multi medal winner at the Commonwealth Games, lives in Dereham
- Jim Mortram, social documentary photographer and writer, is based in Dereham
- The Oldhall family held the manor in the fourteenth and fifteenth centuries: notable members of the family included Sir William Oldhall, Speaker of the House of Commons and his brother Edmund Oldhall, Bishop of Meath
- William O'Callaghan, survivor and hero of Le Paradis massacre during World War II, lived in Dereham for most of his life
- Jo Pitt, para-equestrian
- Chris Rankin, actor, attended Northgate High School, Dereham

== Twin towns ==
Dereham is twinned with:

- Caudebec-lès-Elbeuf, France
- Rüthen, Germany
