= DSFC =

DSFC may refer to:

== Education ==
- Welbeck Defence Sixth Form College
- Dereham Sixth Form College

== Sport ==
- Dial Square F.C.
- Dingli Swallows F.C.
- Druk Star FC
- Dudley Sports F.C.
- Dungannon Swifts F.C.
- Durban Stars F.C.
