= Dunelm =

Dunelm is an abbreviation of the Latin word Dunelmensis (of Durham). It is also use in the name of various things, often associated with Durham.

Dunelm or dunelm may refer to:

- The abbreviation used in signatures by the Bishop of Durham
- The post-nominal abbreviation indicating a degree awarded by the University of Durham
- Dunelm House, the students' union building at Durham University
- Dunelm House, a house at Hummersknott Academy, Hummersknott, Darlington of County Durham
  - Dunelm Block, also at Hummersknott school
- Any of various small businesses, from florists through funeral directors to plumbers, based in and around Durham
- Dunelm Group, formerly Dunelm Mill, a British fabric and soft furnishings company
- Dunelm, a British hash of chicken or veal with mushrooms and cream
- Dunelm, a typeface from MADType
