= Quebec Street drill hall, Dereham =

Drill hall in Dereham, Norfolk, England

Quebec Street drill hall
- Dereham, Norfolk
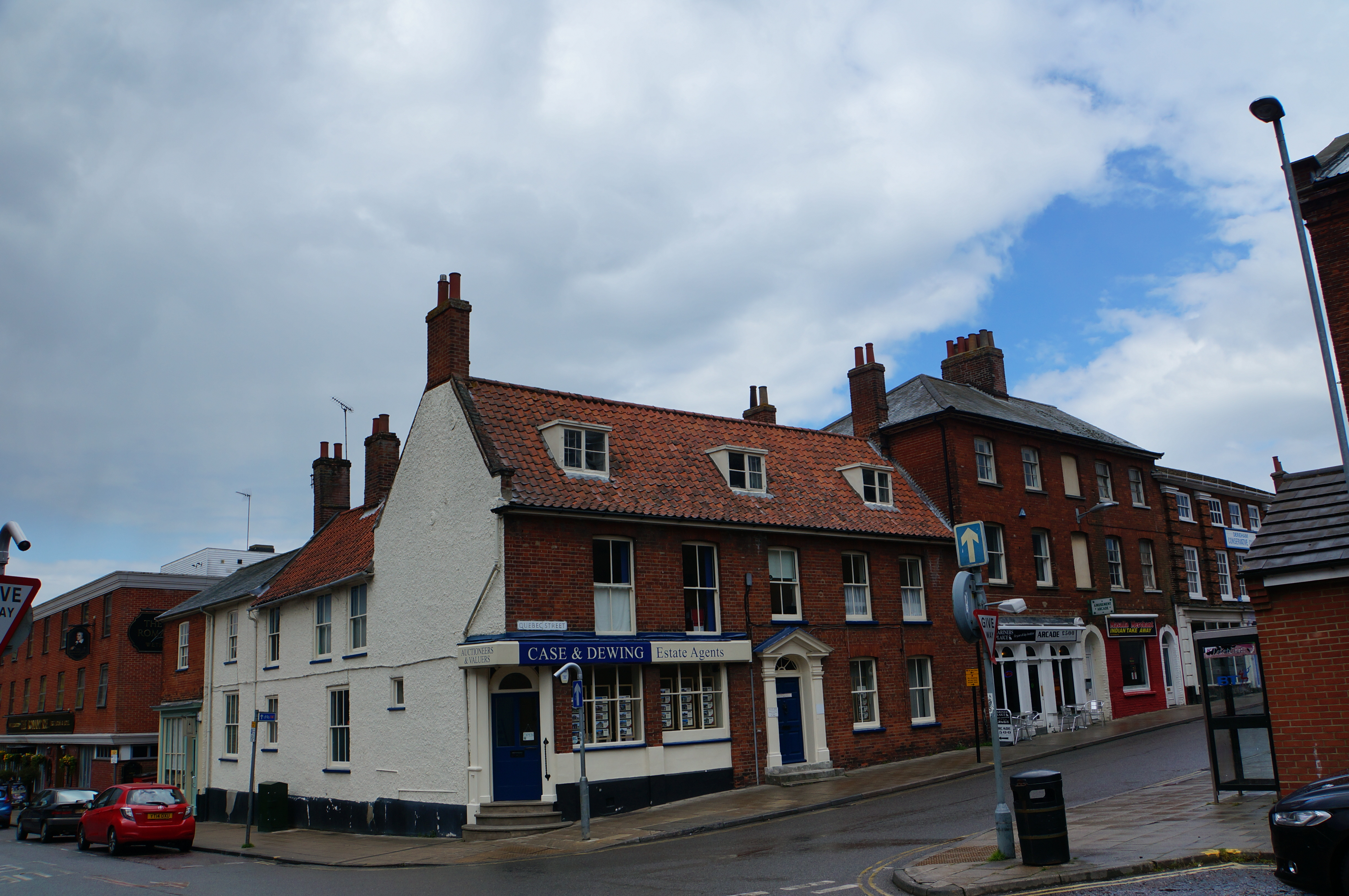
- Quebec Street drill hall, Dereham

Site information
- Type: Drill hall

Location
- Location in Norfolk
- Coordinates: 52.68103°N 0.93985°E

Site history
- Built: 1866
- Built for: War Office
- In use: 1866 – 1947

The Quebec Street drill hall is a former military installation in Dereham, Norfolk.

== History ==
The building, which dates from the 17th century, became the headquarters of the 1st Administrative Battalion, Norfolk Rifle Volunteers in around 1866. This unit evolved to become the 3rd Norfolk Rifle Volunteer Corps in 1872, the 3rd Volunteer Battalion, the Norfolk Regiment in 1883 and the 5th Battalion, the Norfolk Regiment in 1908. The battalion was mobilised at Quebec Street before being deployed to Gallipoli and then to Egypt and Palestine. The building suffered damage during a Zeppelin air raid during the night of 8 September 1915. The battalion was disbanded after the Second World War and the building was decommissioned and is now the offices of an estate agent.
