= William Oldhall =

English politician (died 1460)

Arms: Per pale Azure and Purpure a lion rampant Ermine.

Sir William Oldhall (1390?–1460) was an English soldier and Yorkist supporter, who served as Speaker of the House of Commons of England between 1450 and 1451.

== Life ==
The eldest son and heir of two-time Sheriff of Norfolk and Suffolk, Sir Edmund Oldhall, MP, of Narford, Bodney and East Dereham, in the county of Norfolk, by Alice, daughter of Geoffrey de Fransham of the same county, he was born about 1390. As an esquire in the retinue of Thomas Beaufort, 1st Earl of Dorset, he was present at the siege of Rouen in 1418–19. He also served under Thomas Montacute, 4th Earl of Salisbury in the expedition for the relief of Crevant, July 1423, and won his spurs at the battle of Verneuil on 17 August 1424. About this date, he was made seneschal of Normandy. In the subsequent invasion of Maine and Anjou he further distinguished himself, and was appointed constable of Montsoreau and governor of St. Laurent des Mortiers.

In the summer of 1426 Oldhall was employed in Flanders on a mission to Philip the Good, Duke of Burgundy concerning Jacqueline, Duchess of Gloucester, then a prisoner in the duke's hands. In October 1428 he was detached by the council of Normandy to strengthen the garrison of Argentan, then in danger of falling by treachery into the hands of Jean II, Duke of Alençon. He was present at the great council held at Westminster, 24 April–8 May 1434, on the conduct of the war in France, and also at the council of 24 February 1438–9. In 1440 he was chamberlain to Richard of York, 3rd Duke of York, and a member of his council, and the following year was made feoffee to his use and that of his duchess Cecilia of certain royal manors. In the struggle for the retention of Normandy, he commanded the castle of La Ferté Bernard, which fell into the hands of the French on 16 August 1449.

Oldhall was with the Duke of York in Wales in September 1450; was returned to parliament for Hertfordshire on 15 October of the same year, and on 9 November following was chosen Speaker of the House of Commons. Indicted in 1452 for complicity in the insurrection of Jack Cade and the subsequent rebellion of the Duke of York, he was found guilty, outlawed and attainted on 22 June. He took sanctuary in the chapel royal of St. Martins-le-Grand, where he remained in the custody of the king's valet until after the First Battle of St Albans on 22 May 1455, but obtained his release and the reversal of his outlawry and attainder on 9 July. He was again attainted in November 1459 as a fautor and abettor of the recent Yorkist insurrection; but on the accession of Edward IV of England, the attainder was treated as null and void. He died in London in November 1460, and was buried in St Michael Paternoster Royal.

Besides his Norfolk estates, Oldhall held (by purchase) the manors of Eastwich and Hunsdon, Hertfordshire. On the latter estate, he built, at the cost of seven thousand marks, a castellated brick mansion. It remained in the Crown, notwithstanding the avoidance of his second attainder, and was converted by Henry VIII into a royal residence. In 1558 it was granted by Elizabeth I to Sir Henry Cary. It was later transformed into the existing Hunsdon House.

== Family ==
Oldhall married Margaret, daughter of William Willoughby, 5th Baron Willoughby de Eresby, who was buried in the church of the Grey Friars, London. By her, he had issue an only daughter Mary, whose husband, Walter Gorges of Wraxall, Somerset (ancestor of Sir Ferdinando Gorges), succeeded to Oldhall's Norfolk estates, and died in September 1466. Edmund Oldhall, Bishop of Meath (died 1459) was Oldhall's brother.

Political offices
Preceded by William Tresham	Speaker of the House of Commons; 1450–1452	Succeeded by Thomas Thorpe
