= National Centre for Computing Education =

Educational organisation based in England

- Abbreviation: NCCE
- Formation: 2018; 8 years ago
- Headquarters: York
- Website: computingeducation.org.uk

The National Centre for Computing Education is a government-funded initiative, offering teacher training and resources for computing.

== Function ==
The National Centre for Computing Education provides professional development in computing education for primary and secondary schools and colleges, including face-to-face courses around England, and remote and online courses. It provides a repository of teaching resources for computing through its website, teachcomputing.org. It also offers additional support through Isaac Computer Science, , a free online platform for GCSE and A level computer science students and teachers.

The National Centre is operated by a network of school-based Computing Hubs teachcomputing.org/hubs, geographically distributed around England. These Hubs ensure that the programme is school-led and reflects the needs of teachers on the ground.

== History ==
The centre was set up following the January 2016 government report Digital Skills for the UK Economy which highlighted the digital skills gap in the UK economy, produced by the Department for Business, Innovation and Skills (BIS), which looked at research carried out by the UK Commission for Employment and Skills (UKCES), which itself closed in 2017.

Funding of £84m was announced in the November 2017 United Kingdom budget to upskill around 8000 computer science teachers. Simon Peyton Jones FRS, of Microsoft Research, was appointed as the organisation's chairman in March 2019.

In 2023, the Department for Education renewed its funding for STEM Learning to deliver the next phase of its national support for computing education in England.

== Chair ==
Simon Peyton Jones FRS, of Microsoft Research, was appointed as the organisation's chairman in March 2019. It has been created by STEM Learning at the University of York, the BCS (British Computer Society) and the Raspberry Pi Foundation. It is funded by the Department for Education. The Department of Computer Science and Technology, University of Cambridge will also provide assistance.

== Network of computing hubs ==
=== North East England ===
- Cardinal Hume Catholic School, Gateshead in Tyne and Wear
- Carmel College, Darlington, with Carmel College Sixth Form
- Kings Priory School, Tynemouth in Tyne and Wear

=== North West England ===
- The Fallibroome Academy, Cheshire
- Priestley College, Warrington
- Tameside College, Ashton-under-Lyne

=== Yorkshire and the Humber ===
- All Saints Roman Catholic School, York, South Bank, York
- Bingley Grammar School, West Yorkshire
- Harrogate Grammar School, North Yorkshire

=== East Midlands ===
- Beauchamp College, Oadby in Leicestershire
- Denbigh School, Milton Keynes (for Northamptonshire)
- The Priory Academy LSST in Lincoln, England

=== West Midlands ===
- Bishop Challoner Catholic College, Kings Heath
- The Chase School, Malvern, Worcestershire
- City of Stoke-on-Trent Sixth Form College, Stoke-on-Trent in Staffordshire

=== East of England ===
- Chesterton Community College, Chesterton, Cambridge
- Dereham Neatherd High School, Dereham in Norfolk
- Saffron Walden County High School, Saffron Walden in Essex
- Sandringham School, Marshalswick, St Albans in Hertfordshire
- West Suffolk College, Suffolk
- Westcliff High School for Girls, Southend-on-Sea in Essex

=== Greater London ===
- Newstead Wood School, Orpington in Bromley

=== South East England ===
The Mathematics and Science Learning Centre at the University of Southampton is a delivery partner.

- Bohunt School, Liphook in Hampshire
- Dartford Grammar School, Kent
- Maidstone Grammar School for Girls, Kent
- Park House School, Newbury, Berkshire
- St Clement Danes School, Chorleywood in Hertfordshire

=== South West England ===
- The Castle School, Taunton
- Exeter Mathematics School, a sixth-form in Exeter in Devon
- Pate's Grammar School, Cheltenham
- Truro and Penwith College, Cornwall

== See also ==
- Micro Bit
- National Centre for Excellence in the Teaching of Mathematics in south Sheffield
