= Hunsdon House =

Historic house in Hertfordshire, England

Coordinates: 51.79536°N 0.056364°E

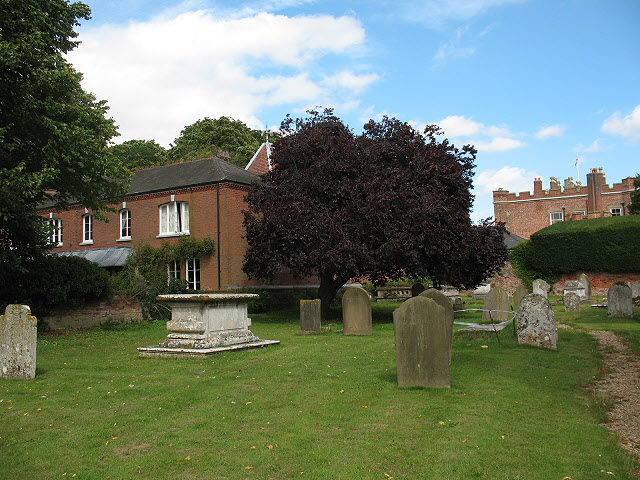
Hunsdon House, as seen from the adjacent churchyard. (West end of main house is on the right; service building on the left.)

Hunsdon House is a historic house in Hunsdon, Hertfordshire, England, northwest of Harlow. Originally constructed in the 15th century, it was most notably the estate of King Henry VIII. It has been rebuilt several times since then, and is no longer as grand as it was in the Tudor era. It is a Grade I listed building.

== Early history ==
It was originally constructed of brick in 1447 by Sir William Oldhall in the shape of a tower, but as Oldhall supported the House of York during the Wars of the Roses, he was stripped of the property by the Lancastrian Henry VI. Upon the Yorkist Edward IV's accession to the throne in 1471, the land was returned to the Oldhall family. John Oldhall then died in the Battle of Bosworth and with the Lancastrians back in power, the estate was taken over by Henry VII. Henry traded it to his mother Margaret Beaufort for Old Soar Manor in Kent in 1503. After the death of Margaret in 1509, her grandson Henry VIII gave it to Thomas Howard, 2nd Duke of Norfolk in 1514. Howard's son reduced the height of the tower for safety reasons in 1524.

== Tudor era ==
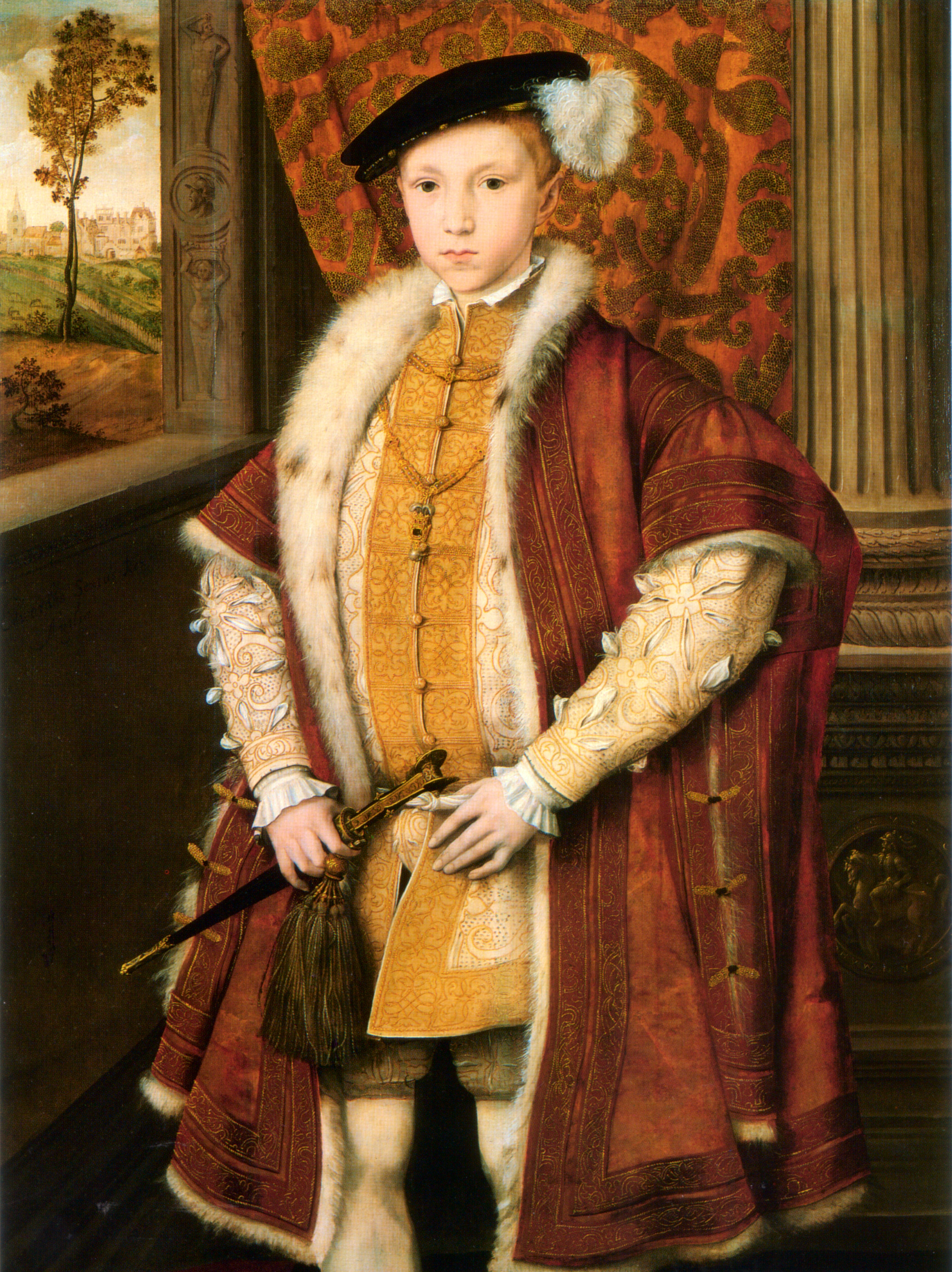
Portrait of Edward VI, with Hunsdon House in the background.

When Henry VIII retook possession in 1525 after Thomas Howard's death, he set about expanding the house into a palatial estate in the Tudor style, complete with royal apartments and even a moat. Although he visited frequently and enjoyed hunting in the deerpark, the house was mainly used for his children, especially Mary, who lived there until her accession to the throne. She even inherited the house after the death of her father and kept it until her death. Prince Edward notably spent much time at Hunsdon, most famously in 1546 when his portrait was painted with the house in the background. Elizabeth I made her cousin Henry Carey the first Baron Hunsdon, after granting the house to him in 1559.

== Recent centuries ==
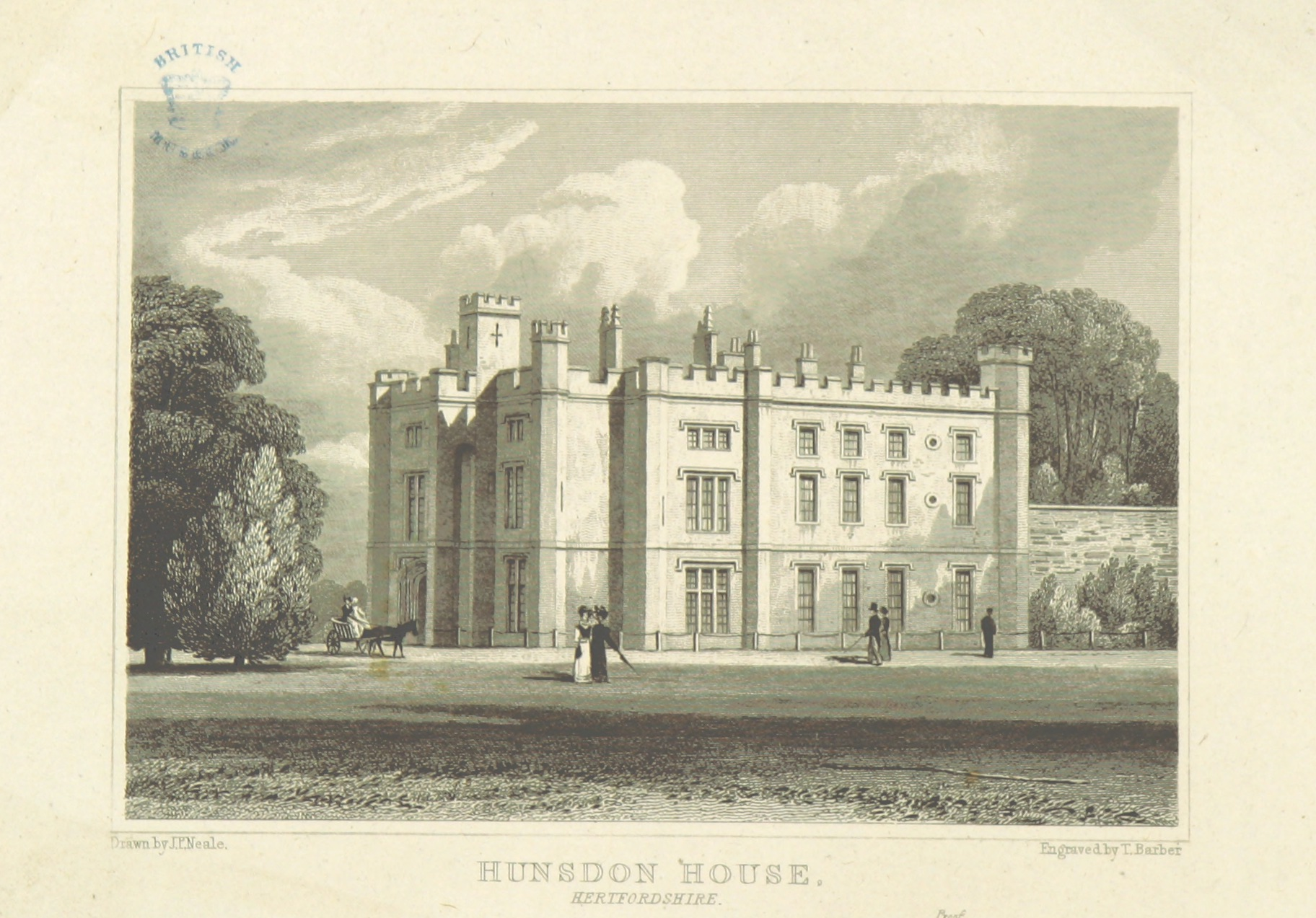
A drawing of Hunsdon House from 1818 by artist John Preston Neale. Held by the British Library.

The manor stayed in the Carey family for over 100 years, after which it passed to the Bluck family and then the Calvert family. Much of Henry VIII's expansions were torn down in the early 17th century, and the moat was filled some time in the 18th century. The house was rebuilt at the beginning of the 19th century, but 1860 renovations by Nicolson Calvert changed much of the architecture to an Elizabethan style. One last renovation in 1983 revealed some of the 15th-century brickwork. The current house is less than a quarter of its size under Henry VIII.

Today the building is Grade I listed, privately owned and not open to the public. It is possible to view the exterior from public footpaths when walking the area.

== See also ==
- Category: Tudor architecture
- Category: Tudor England
