= East Dereham Windmill =

Windmill in Dereham, Norfolk, England

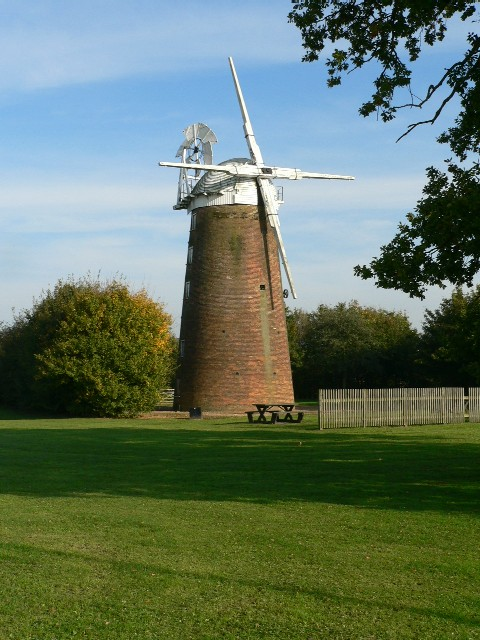
- The mill in 2006
- Interactive map of East Dereham Windmill

Origin
- Mill name: Norwich Road Mill; Fendick's Mill
- Mill location: TG 0033 1297
- Coordinates: 52°40′38″N 0°57′42″E
- Operator: Dereham Town Council
- Year built: 1836

Information
- Purpose: Corn
- Type: Tower mill
- Storeys: Five storeys
- No. of sails: Four sails
- Type of sails: Double Patent sails
- Windshaft: Cast iron
- Winding: Fantail
- Fantail blades: Eight blades
- Auxiliary power: Steam engine, later replaced by a paraffin engine
- No. of pairs of millstones: Three pairs

Norwich Road Mill or Fendick's Mill is a Grade II listed tower mill at East Dereham, Norfolk, England which was most recently restored and reopened to visitors in 2013.

== History ==
Norwich Road Mill was built in 1836 by millwright James Hardy of Toftwood for Michael Hardy, who had a smock mill at Bittering. Hardy worked the mill himself but advertised it to let in 1837. It was taken by John Armes. In 1877, Hardy was in financial difficulties, and the mill was sold by auction at the King's Arms Inn, East Dereham on 16 February 1844 along with others at Gressenhall, Ovington and Wicklewood.

The mill was bought for £650 by William Fendick. He had a post mill at West End, Shipdham. The mill was let to John Willden from 1850 to 1856. In 1863, William Fendick died and the mill was offered to let. The business was carried on by Fendick's widow Sarah until 1871 when their son William took over. A steam engine was installed as auxiliary power. He worked the mill until his death in 1904. The mill passed to his son William, who was also running a tower mill at Mill Street, Mattishall. The mill was sold in 1909 to Charles Robert Gray and Arthur James Milk. Gray died in 1922. The sails were removed about this time and the steam engine was replaced by a paraffin engine. Milk died in 1926 and the firm was carried on by William Robert Gray, Arthur Payne Milk and Henry Jonas Harding Garlick trading as Robert Gray Ltd. The mill was worked by engine until 1937.

=== Attempts at restoration ===
The mill was sold to Green's Nurseries in 1973. Planning permission to convert the mill to residential accommodation was sought sometime after the Second World War but was refused. In 1973, an application for permission to demolish the mill was refused as the mill was a listed building by that time (since 1972). A repair notice was served on Green's Nurseries in November 1974 but they did not repair the mill. In December 1977, the remains of the cap and the windshaft were removed by Lennard & Lawn (Millwrights) Ltd. The mill was sold in 1978 to Breckland District Council for £1. The brickwork, floors, windows and doors were repaired in spring 1979 via a scheme supported by the Manpower Services Commission which gave three unemployed people work for three months. In July 1979, Breckland District Council approved further restoration work to complete the first phase of the restoration.

Photographs from 1982 confirm that some renovations were underway. In March 1983, permission was granted to the Girl Guides and Toc H to use the mill as a meeting room on a weekly basis during the summer months. In January 1984, it was revealed that vandalism had occurred at the mill. In December 1984, Breckland District Council approved repair work to the mill and agreed to investigate the possibility of installing an electricity and water supply to the mill. John Lawn was asked to survey the mill and produce a report on the cost of restoration. Restoration of the mill as a landmark was undertaken by John Lawn and the mill was formally opened to the public on 14 September 1987.

In 2002, the mill was taken over by Dereham Town Council. In July 2003, the Friends of Dereham Mill sought a £500 National Lottery Awards for All grant to fund a comprehensive survey of the mill by millwright Tom Davies. On 13 January 2004, the mill lost half a sail in a gale. It was reported that the Friends of Dereham Mill were hoping that insurance money would be able to be used to assist with the estimated £600,000 cost of full restoration on the mill. In 2005, an appeal was launched for photographs of the mill when it had its original sails on, as those fitted during the restoration were thought to be the wrong type. In November 2007, planning permission was granted for a visitor centre to be built at the mill. It was reported that a Heritage Lottery Fund grant was being sought to enable the restoration of the mill to working order. The application for lottery funds was turned down.

The sails had been removed but funding was not adequate to repair and reinstall them; in February 2010, the mill was boarded up. A new group of Trustees formed in 2011 and were successful in gaining funding to restore the structure and its sails. The work was completed by summer 2013 and Dereham Windmill reopened as a Community Exhibition Centre in September 2013. Since that time, the mill has been open on certain days of the week, with exhibits changing each month. In 2020, the ground floor was fully accessible and guides were available to take visitors to other floors of the structure. Each floor included illustrated explanations of the process that was underway in that area during the early days of the mill. A news report in mid April 2020 however, indicated some concern due to a shortage of volunteers and of potential board members for the Dereham Windmill Charity.

== Description ==
Norwich Road Mill is a five-storey tower mill with a boat shaped cap winded by a fantail. The mill had four double Patent sails. The tower is 42 feet (12.80 m) to the curb. The lower section of the upright shaft remains, with a 9 feet (2.74 m) diameter cast iron great spur wheel with wooden cogs. The crown wheel, which received the drive from the engine, is of wood.

== Millers ==
- Michael Hardy 1836-37
- John Armes 1837-44
- William Fendick 1844-50
- John Willden 1850-56
- William Fendick 1856-63
- Sarah Fendick 1863-71
- William Fendick 1871-1903
- William Fendick Jr 1903-09
- Charles Robert Gray 1909-22
- Arthur James Milk 1909-26
- Robery Gray Ltd 1926-37

Reference for above:-

== Public access ==
East Dereham Windmill is open to the public see above. The exterior may be viewed at any time.
