= Michael Barton (cricketer) =

English cricketer

Personal information
- Full name: Michael Richard Barton
- Born: 14 October 1914; East Dereham, Norfolk
- Died: 1 July 2006 (aged 91); Sevenoaks, Kent
- Batting: Right-handed

Career statistics
Competition	First-class
Matches	147
Runs scored	5,965
Batting average	25.82
100s/50s	7/25
Top score	192
Catches/stumpings	117/–
- Source: CricketArchive, 14 April 2023

Michael Richard Barton (14 October 1914 – 1 July 2006) was an English first-class cricketer. A right-handed batsman, in a first-class career lasting from 1935 to 1955, he scored 5965 runs at 25.82, with 7 hundreds and a highest score of 192.

He was educated at Oriel College, Oxford, and appeared for Oxford University from 1935 to 1937, winning a Blue in the latter two years. He also played for Norfolk in the Minor Counties Championship from 1933 to 1947.

After his Oxford days his first-class career appeared to be over, but Surrey found themselves short of a captain (who in those days by convention had to be an amateur) and approached him. He captained them in some games in 1948, and was the official club captain from 1949 to 1951. Surrey were the joint County Champions with Lancashire in 1950.

He was Surrey President in 1983.
