= Dereham Rush Meadow =

Site of Special Scientific Interest in Norfolk, UK

Coordinates: 52.689°N 0.919°E

- Site of Special Scientific Interest
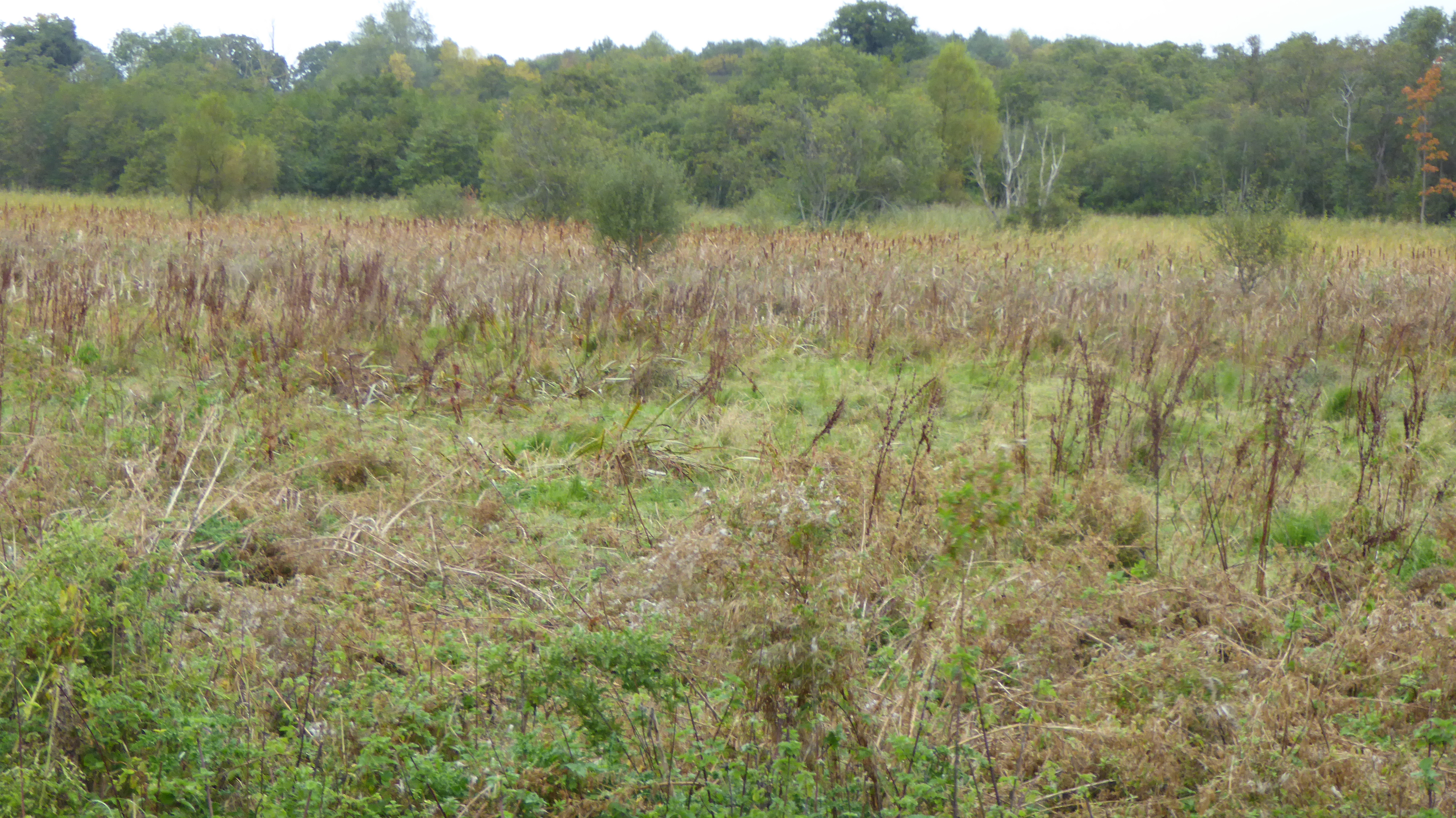
- Location of Dereham Rush Meadow.
- Area of search: Norfolk
- Grid reference: TF 974 141
- Interest: Biological
- Area: 22.2 hectares (55 acres)
- Notification date: 1989
- Location map: Magic Map

Dereham Rush Meadow is a 22.2-hectare (55-acre) biological Site of Special Scientific Interest north-west of Dereham in Norfolk, England.

This is an area of grassland and alder carr in the valley of a tributary of the River Wensum. The site has diverse habitats and it is traditionally maintained by grazing by horses. It is subject to flooding in winter.

The site is private land with no public access.
