= Carmel College, Darlington =

Coordinates: 54.52439°N 1.58593°W

Carmel College

Location
- The Headlands; Darlington, County Durham, DL3 8RW; England

Information
- Type: Academy
- Religious affiliation: Roman Catholic
- Established: 1974
- Department for Education URN: 137622 Tables
- Ofsted: Reports
- Principal: Melanie Kane
- Gender: Mixed
- Age: 11 to 18
- Enrolment: 1363
- Houses: Aidans, Bedes, Cuthberts, Hildas
- Colours: Navy blue, yellow, red and green
- Website: http://www.carmel.bhcet.org.uk/

Carmel College (formerly Carmel RC College) is a Catholic secondary school on The Headlands in Hummersknott, Darlington, England. It also has a sixth form, Carmel College Sixth Form. Following an OFSTED inspection in 2024, Carmel was graded as outstanding in all categories. It is part of the Bishop Hogarth Catholic Education Trust (formerly Carmel Education Trust) which includes 35 schools in the North East Region.

The current principal is Melanie Kane, with deputies Sarah Thornton and Monita Atkinson.

The college includes various Catholic aspects, such as a Chapel, student-led liturgies during morning form and weekly masses in the Chapel, crucifixes in each classroom, and liturgy assemblies at the end of each term. Notably, at the end of each year, Carmel hosts a large end-of-year mass, where the entire college gathers in the sports hall at the same time to celebrate the liturgy together.

== Admissions ==
Carmel College is the town's only Catholic secondary school. It has four main feeder schools at Primary level. These are St Teresa's RC Primary, St Bede's RC Primary, St Augustine's RC Primary and Holy Family RC Primary. There is also a neighbouring school, Abbey; despite being non-Catholic, Abbey still brings a small number of students into Carmel each year. The school admits roughly 200 students per year, with the 6th form admitting an additional 150. Carmel also has a sixth form.

Carmel College has eight forms which consist of C, A, R, M, E, L and J, P (from former Pope John Paul II) with four houses St. Aidans (C & A), St Hildas (R & M), St. Bedes (E & L) and St. Cuthberts (J & P). Each form consists of roughly 25-30 students.

== History ==
It began life as St Mary's Grammar School, a boys' grammar school, becoming comprehensive and co-educational in September 1974 when it merged with the Immaculate Conception Grammar School, a girls' Catholic grammar school.

The modern-day "St. Mary's" building, also known as Hummersknott House, has long been rumoured to be haunted by the college ghost, Harriet.

The John Caden Hall was opened by former prime minister of the United Kingdom Tony Blair in 2004, and is named after Father John Caden, who died in 2013.

Carmel underwent a multimillion-pound building project, completed in 2008, which included three new teaching blocks and the refurbishment of many of the old facilities. Carmel also upgraded its Sixth Form facilities; expanding the common room and providing a "learning resource centre" in the schools library. This was carried out in Summer 2010, and opened the following school year.

Tony Blair paid his last school visit as prime minister in 2007 at Carmel before he resigned, officially opening the new "Newton" building housing the Physics, Chemistry and Biology Departments, including 8 laboratories.

The campus went through a further transformation in the school year 2012/2013 involving the full reconstruction of the schools "Upper" dining hall with new classrooms placed above which were required due to the schools recent expansion to 8 "form" groups per year-group. The new dining Hall included new flat-screen televisions and a new glass wall between the dining hall and the lower floor of the schools library. The upgrade also included the replacement of the roof on the school library and reception building and a major refurbishment of the schools Gym located near to the Music Department and the Science "Newton" Block.

On 1 November 2011, Carmel RC College was officially closed, and Carmel College: A Catholic Academy was opened, as the school converted to an academy on this date. The school was named in July 2019 as a computing hub for the National Centre for Computing Education.

In 2021 a multimillion pound development project was initiated, creating a new building over the old stable and connected to the sports hall to create a new sixth form centre which consists of study areas and a fitness centre alongside a production suite overlooking the sports hall. The project was delayed due to the COVID-19 pandemic, however was opened in mid 2022.

In the winter of 2021, headteacher Mike Shorten was promoted to CEO of the Bishop Hogarth Catholic Education Trust, and Melanie Kane was appointed as the new headteacher of Carmel in his place.

Another construction project began in 2023, which created a large outdoor covered seating area for students, adjacent to the school's lower dining hall.

In September 2023, the kitchen, library, and various classrooms in the school were closed due to the RAAC crisis. The school hired port-a-cabins to make up for the lost classrooms and converted the breakout area in the History department into a temporary library. All affected areas were reopened in April 2024 and the port-a-cabins were removed in the summer.

In September 2024, the college refurbished all of its toilet facilities in an effort to prevent students from gathering in intimidating groups. The new design replaced all of the urinals with cubicles, each with a floor-to-ceiling door, and removed the doors from the entrance of the toilets. The school also installed vape detectors inside of each cubicle in order to prevent students from vaping.

== Academic performance ==
The GCSE exam results of 2012 were the best to date, having 100% of students getting at least 5 A*-C GCSE certificates (95% including English and Mathematics). The A-level pass rate was 99% at A2, with 52% achieving the highest grades of A*, A or B. The average point score was of 1030 points per student.

The most recent GCSE results, from 2025, show an 89% pass rate for English and an 83% pass rate for Maths, with 26% of all grades awarded being a grade 7 or above.

== Accreditations ==
Carmel College is the Lead school in Carmel Teacher Training Partnership, an accredited ITT provider, training teachers for Qualified Teacher Status QTS in both primary and secondary schools through SCITT and [School Direct]. Carmel College was recognised in its most recent (as of 2020) Ofsted inspection as Outstanding in all categories in 2013. Carmel College was accredited as a 'Teaching School' in April 2012. However, The Government and DfE launched a new teaching school hub programme in September 2021 and Carmel College Teaching Alliance has now rebranded as Carmel Professional Training Centre (CPTC).

== Sixth Form ==
Carmel Sixth Form College admits around 150 students each year, mostly aged between 16 and 18. It offers full-time courses of around 20 AS and A-level courses and several BTEC and enrichment courses.

General entry requirements are 5 GCSEs at grades 9-4, however, many courses may request at least a grade 6 in specific subjects
