= Dereham Neatherd High School =

Location
- Norwich Road; Dereham, Norfolk, NR20 3AX; England; 52.6797°N 0.9567°E

Information
- Type: Academy
- Motto: Learning Without Limits
- Established: 1912
- Founder: Alexandra Fisher
- Local authority: Norfolk
- Trust: Enrich Learning Trust
- Department for Education URN: 144316 Tables
- Ofsted: Reports
- Chair: Ian Osley
- Head teacher: Jaime Mallett
- Gender: Mixed
- Age: 11 to 16
- Enrolment: 1080
- Capacity: 1025
- Houses: Cavell, Cowper, Fry and Wollaston
- Website: http://neatherd.org/

Dereham Neatherd High School is a high school situated in Dereham, Norfolk, England. It is a co-educational comprehensive school, for ages 11–16.

== History ==
The school was formerly the Dereham High School for Girls, opening in 1912. The first headteacher was Alexandra Fisher, with the first pupil entered onto the roll on 25 January 1912.

The school was named in July 2019 as a computing hub for the National Centre for Computing Education.

The school used to be twinned with Dereham Sixth Form College.

== Centenary ==
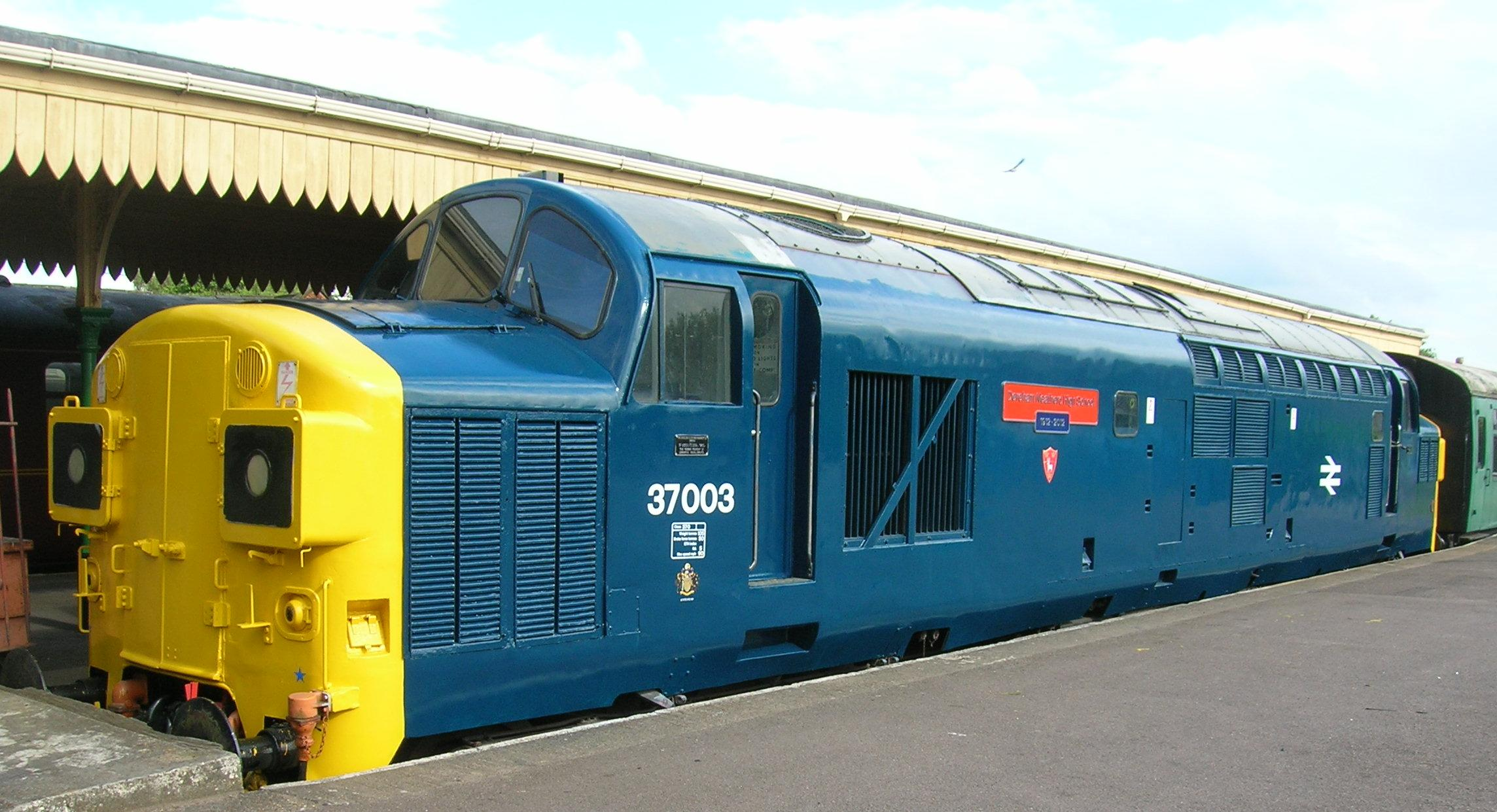
37003 'Dereham Neatherd High School' on the Mid-Norfolk Railway

British Rail Class 37 diesel locomotive 37003, based on the Mid-Norfolk Railway, was named 'Dereham Neatherd High School 1912-2012' as part of the celebrations of the centenary of the school. The 15 miles (24 km) Mid-Norfolk Railway runs from Dereham to Wymondham.
