= Edmund Oldhall =

English-born cleric and judge

Edmund Oldhall (after 1390 – 1459) was an English-born cleric and judge in fifteenth-century Ireland. He was Bishop of Meath and acting Lord Chancellor of Ireland. He was a brother of the leading Yorkist statesman Sir William Oldhall.

He was the younger son of Sir Edmund Oldhall and Alice, daughter of Geoffrey de Fransham. The Oldhalls were substantial landowners in Norfolk, holding the manors of East Dereham, Bodney and Narford.

Edmund entered the Carmelite order and purchased the office of Bishop of Meath in 1450. In 1451 Richard, Duke of York, the Lord Lieutenant of Ireland made his second son Edmund, Earl of Rutland, Lord Chancellor of Ireland. Since Edmund was only eight years old he was obviously obliged to act through a Deputy and the appointment was given to Bishop Oldhall, no doubt through the influence of his brother William, who was Speaker of the House of Commons and a key associate of the Duke of York. Edmund served as Deputy until 1454. The temporalities of the See were withheld from him for a time, but restored by Act of Parliament in 1455.

He died on 9 August 1459 at his official residence of Ardbraccan and was buried in St. Mary's Church nearby. An impressive monument was erected in his memory, but it was destroyed in the nineteenth century.
