= Metamec =

English clock manufacturer

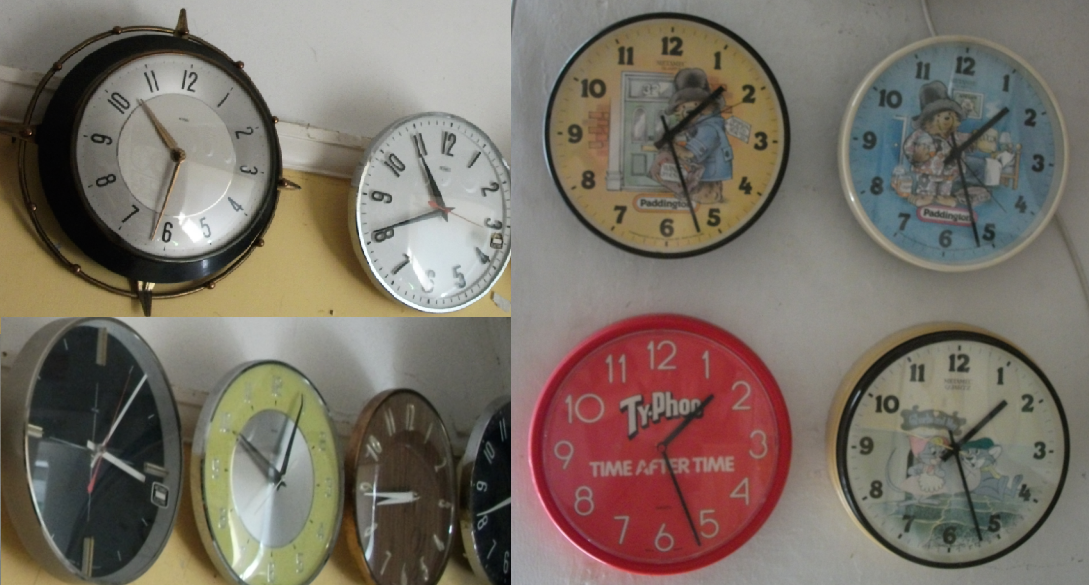
Typical Metamec clocks, dating from the 1960s to 1980s.

Metamec was a manufacturer of domestic clocks in the second half of the 20th century, and was based in Dereham, Norfolk, England. The name "Metamec" is derived from "metal-work and mechanics". The company started as an offshoot of the furniture manufacturers Jentique about 1941, which made boxes for instruments and bombs during World War II.

== Products ==
The first Metamec model was a mains-powered mantle clock numbered "701" (approx. 1947). All clocks produced by Metamec were produced to a high standard, and the factory expanded with the purchase of new machines to allow them to create their own movements, rather than import the movements from other clock companies. The factory increased in size during the 1960s and 70s, and employed approx 750 people, producing 350 models of clock, and producing 25,000 clocks per week. They became a manufacturer of the now iconic large 'Sunburst' chrome, teak and brass clocks. Metamec was the largest clock manufacturer in the UK at the time.

== Decline ==
The company declined in the 1980s due to penetration by the German clock industry and imports from the Far East. Metamec went into receivership in December 1984 and was purchased in January 1985 by FKI of Halifax, West Yorkshire, who continued to use the name until 1993. The Metamec site in East Dereham was run by Ross Consumer Electronics (RCE) until the closure in 1994. Production was moved to the RCE site near Southampton.

== Later brand use ==
As of 2016, the name "Metamec" was used by Derbyshire-based clock manufacturer Metamec Limited.
