= November 2017 United Kingdom budget =

2017 United Kingdom budget
- Presented: Wednesday 22 November 2017
- Country: United Kingdom
- Parliament: 57th
- Party: Conservative Party
- Chancellor: Philip Hammond
- Total revenue: £769 billion
- Total expenditures: £809 billion
- Deficit: £40 billion (1.9% of GDP)

The November 2017 United Kingdom budget, sometimes described as the Autumn 2017 United Kingdom budget, was delivered by Philip Hammond, the Chancellor of the Exchequer, to the House of Commons on Wednesday, 22 November 2017. It was Hammond's second as Chancellor of the Exchequer since being appointed to the role in July 2016.

== The budget ==
=== Economic statistics ===
==== Government borrowing ====
1. It reached £49.9bn in 2016–17, down by £8.4bn from the previous forecast.
2. Forecasts were down from £39.5bn for 2017–18 to £25.6bn in 2022–23.

==== A balanced budget ====
1. The government's fiscal target of reducing the structural deficit to 2% of GDP by 2021.

==== GDP ====
1. At time of the budget the UK was seen to have slipped to the 6th largest economy in 2017. but the recent strengthening of the Pound Sterling means the UK is still the 5th largest economy, according to the IMF. Meanwhile, France slipped to 7th place.
2. The top 6 economies are:
  1. United States
  2. China
  3. Japan
  4. Germany
  5. United Kingdom
  6. India

=== NHS (England) ===
1. £10bn capital investment in frontline services over the course of this parliament.
2. £2.8bn of extra funding.

=== Pensions ===
1. The "lifetime allowance" on pension contributions will increase by £30,000, from £1m to £1.03m after April 2018.

=== Living wage ===
1. Up to £7.83 an hour, from £7.50.
2. Pay for over 25s increases to £7.83, ahead of inflation.

=== Tax ===
==== Duty, VAT, NI and tax ====
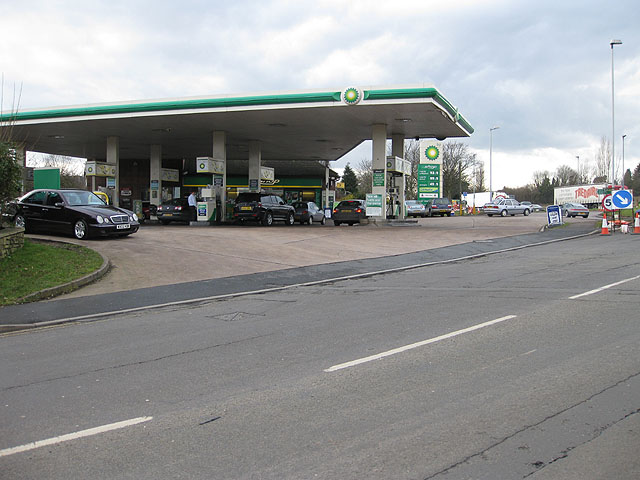
UK filling stations collected more than £27 billion in fuel duty in 2014–15. The Fuel duty rise cancelled for 2017–18. Those charging electric vehicles at work will not face taxes.

1. Basic rate rises to £11,850 from April; 40% threshold increases to £46,350 in England, Wales and Northern Ireland.
2. Chancellor has previously pledged to increase basic rate to £12,500 by 2020.
3. Duties on spirits, wine and beer is frozen.
4. A new tax band for still cider and perry with alcohol content between 6.9%–7.5% to target white cider.
5. Fuel duty rise cancelled.
6. Counter tax avoidance measures to raise £4.8bn by 2022–23.
7. Consultation on threshold of £85,000 at which small businesses pay VAT.
8. Tax thresholds to rise in line with inflation
9. The National Insurance rise is scrapped.
10. A consultation is launched on new tax to replace stamp duty
11. Those charging electric vehicles at work will not face taxes.
12. 1 percentage point increase in company car tax.
13. From 2018, an increase in tax on cars that don't meet standards will go up by one band.
14. Increase on air passenger duty on premium-class tickets.

==== Stamp duty (England) ====
1. Abolished for first-time buyers on homes up to £300,000, and on the first £300,000 of properties up to £500,000 in London.

==== Business rates (England) ====
1. £2.3bn cost to bring forward the change to Consumer Prices Index from Retail Prices Index by two years to 2018.
2. After next revaluation, future revaluations to take place every three years rather than five.
3. Staircase tax: businesses hit will have original bill reinstated.
4. Discount for pubs (rateable value less than £100,000) extended by one year to March 2019.

==== Digital tax ====
1. £200m a year extra from income tax on UK sales.
2. Target £1.2bn a year in lost VAT from online shopping.

=== Education (England) ===
1. Maths: £40m for maths teachers; £600 premium for schools for each student taking A-level maths.
2. Computing: triple number of science teachers to 12,000; new national centre for computing. The National Centre for Computing Education (NCCE) opened in November 2018 with £84m of funding.
1. National retraining scheme for digital expertise.

=== The regions ===
==== Northern powerhouse ====
1. £1.7bn transforming cities fund.

==== Scotland, Wales and Northern Ireland ====
1. £650m extra for Northern Ireland.
2. £2bn extra for Scotland.
3. £1.2bn extra for Wales.

=== Oil industry ===
1. Tax changes to encourage investment; 'Transferable Tax History' for oil and gas fields in the North Sea.

=== Transport (England) ===
==== Roads ====
1. £400m for charging infrastructure fund.
2. Those charging electric vehicles at work will not face taxes.
3. 1 percentage point increase in company car tax.
4. From 2018, an increase in tax on cars that don't meet standards will go up by one band.
5. Proceeds to fund £220m clean air fund.

==== Rail Travel ====
1. 1 Rail Card-4.5 million people aged 26–30 to get a third off rail fares.
1. 2 £337 million for new Tyne and Wear Metro Trains for Newcastle

==== Airlines ====
1. Increase on air passenger duty on premium-class tickets.
  1. Premium, business and first class tickets by £16 and those travelling by private jet by £47 per journey. Currently it only hits those travelling over 2,000 miles at £450 per journey on outbound flights, while long-haul top-end passengers pay £150.

=== Research and development ===
1. £2.3bn of investment.
2. Increase tax credit to 12%.
3. £500m for artificial intelligence and 5G initiatives.

=== Industry and charges on plastic waste. ===
1. £20bn of new investment in UK knowledge-intensive industries.
2. £2.5bn for the British Business Bank.
3. Encourage pension fund investment.
4. Boost to Enterprise Investment Scheme.
5. Replace funding from Europe.

=== Universal credit ===
1. £1.5bn to remove seven-day waiting period; new claimants in receipt of housing benefit will get it for two weeks.

=== Housing (England) ===
==== General policies ====
1. £1.5 billion to get SME housebuilders.
2. 100% council tax premium on empty properties.
3. £28m in three new housing pilot schemes – in the West Midlands, Manchester and Liverpool – to halve rough sleeping by 2022 and eliminate it by 2027.
4. £44bn of capital funding to help build 300,000 homes annually by mid-2020s.
5. New money for homebuilders fund.
6. £630m 'small sites fund'.
7. £8bn of financial guarantees to support private housebuilding.
8. £2.7bn housing infrastructure fund.
9. £1.1bn for new urban regeneration.
10. £34m to train construction workers.
11. A review to be chaired by Oliver Letwin to look at ways to speed up planning permission.
12. Five new garden towns.
13. One million new homes on the Cambridge-Milton Keynes-Oxford corridor by 2050.
14. £1.5m derelict house renovation several places in Lincolnshire, including in Skegness.
15. Abolished stamp duty for first-time buyers on homes up to £300,000, and on the first £300,000 of properties up to £500,000 in London.

==== Grenfell Tower victims ====
1. £28m for mental health services and local regeneration for Kensington and Chelsea council.

==== Rents ====
1. £125m of funding over the next two years to help 140,000 people.

=== Brexit fiscal failure issues ===
1. £3bn set aside for Brexit preparations.

=== Banking ===
1. Lifetime allowance increase confirmed.

=== Economic growth ===
1. Revised down to 1.5% in 2017 from 2%.
2. Forecasts are 1.4% in 2018, 1.3% in 2019, 1.3% in 2020, 1.5% in 2021 and 1.6% in 2022.
3. In March the forecasts were 1.6% in 2018, 1.7% in 2019, 1.9% in 2020 and 2% in 2021.

== Responses ==
- The NHS said it did not meet demands.
- The Chancellor boasted "significant investments for the future"
- The Office for Budget Responsibility (OBR) slammed the stamp duty cut.
- The Office for Budget Responsibility expected the economy growing by just 1.5% in 2017–18 and 1.4% in 2018–19, down from the previous estimate of 2% and 1.6%, respectively.
- The Senedd questioned the value of the chancellor's tax-break for first time home buyers.
- Shares in many estate agents raised. Foxtons rose 4.25p to 72p, shares in Countrywide gained 3.5p to 114.5p, and Savills rose 1p to 948p.
- The Conservative MPs offer unswerving loyalty to the Chancellor, but Labour, the SNP and Lib' Dem's were very critical of him.

=== Debate ===
A debate was held in House of Commons on 22 November 2017. During Jeremy Corbyn's response to the November 2017 Budget on 22 November 2017, Tory Whip Andrew Griffiths heckled him over his comments on the lack of adequate Government funding for care homes. Labour MPs accused Griffiths of ageism and abusive language for shouting that Corbyn belonged in a care home. Griffiths denied this, instead suggesting that he was responding to Corbyn's statement "there are elderly people in need of help," and that he said: "That's you!" Corbyn responded with the comment: "The uncaring, uncouth attitude of certain members of parliament needs to be called out".
