= Hummersknott =

Village in United Kingdom

Coordinates: 54.523°N 1.592°W

Hummersknott is an area in the western end of Darlington, County Durham England. It is a ward in the unitary authority of Darlington. It consists of mainly post-war houses, and is closely linked to Mowden. The population of the ward taken at the 2011 Census was 3,478.

The area of Hummersknott is generally regarded as the area around Hummersknott Academy and up to Carmel Road North. There is also a Victorian cemetery and a Catholic secondary school, Carmel RC College, which also has a sixth form.
