= Northgate High School, Dereham =

Northgate High School

Location
- Cemetery Road; Dereham, Norfolk, NR19 2EU; England
- Coordinates: 52°41′18″N 0°56′41″E

Information
- Type: Academy
- Trust: Unity Education Trust
- Department for Education URN: 141268 Tables
- Ofsted: Reports
- Chair of Governors: Karen Thompson
- Headteacher: Jake Watts
- Gender: Coeducational
- Age: 11 to 16
- Enrollment: 1,129
- Capacity: 1,280
- Website: http://www.northgate.norfolk.sch.uk/

Northgate High School, formerly Northgate High School and Dereham Sixth Form College, is an academy situated in Dereham, Norfolk, England. It is a co-educational comprehensive school, for ages 11–18. It is one of two high schools in the town.

== History ==
The school converted to academy status in September 2014. In October 2016 Northgate announced its intention to form a Multi-Academy Trust, called the Unity Academy Trust. The Unity Academy Trust name was already in use elsewhere, therefore the trust was launched as the Unity Education Trust on 1 March 2017, comprising the following five establishments:

- Northgate High School & Dereham Sixth Form College
- Grove House Infant & Junior School
- Kings Park Infant School
- Beeston Primary School
- Garvestone Primary School

== Curriculum ==
Virtually all maintained schools and academies follow the National Curriculum, and are inspected by Ofsted on how well they succeed in delivering a 'broad and balanced curriculum'. The school has to decide whether Key Stage 3 contains years 7, 8 and 9- or whether year 9 should be in Key Stage 4 and the students just study subjects that will be examined by the GCSE exams at 16. Northgate High School has a three-year Key Stage 3 but pupils start their Key Stage 4 options at the Easter of Year 9.

== Key Stage 5 - Sixth Form ==
Dereham Sixth Form College is a post-16 sixth form centre in the Norfolk town of Dereham, England. The centre is operated by Northgate High School, offering AS level, BTEC and A level courses. From 1977 to 2016 the college was jointly managed and governed by the two high schools in Dereham, Neatherd and Northgate. Teaching was divided equally between both schools. Northgate High School was awarded the college in July 2016 by Norfolk County Council following the declaration in February 2016 by the governing body of Dereham Neatherd High School that it desired to set up its own sixth form. Later, in the same month, Northgate announced that it was setting up a Multi Academy Trust with Dereham Sixth Form College.

Most teaching is carried out within the college site, with some classes taught at Northgate. Students at the college are on the roll of Northgate High School, and the results of the college are claimed by Northgate.

== Notable former pupils ==
- Chris Rankin, actor, famous for role as Percy Weasley in the Harry Potter films
- Bobby Copping, former professional footballer
- Chris Baker, high jumper
- Todd Cantwell, professional footballer.
