= Chris Rankin =

New Zealand–born British actor

- Born: New Zealand
- Education: University of Lincoln
- Occupations: Actor; director; producer
- Years active: 2001–present
- Known for: Percy Weasley in Harry Potter franchise

Chris Rankin is a New Zealand–born British actor, director, and producer who is best known for playing Percy Weasley in the Harry Potter film franchise.

== Early life ==
Rankin was adopted. Rankin lived in Rothesay Bay until he was six, attending Kristin School in Albany. He and his parents subsequently moved to Norfolk in the United Kingdom, where he attended Thomas Bullock Primary School, Northgate High School, and Dereham Sixth Form College.

He completed his studies at the University of Lincoln in 2011.

== Career ==
Rankin began acting at the age of eleven. At Northgate High School he appeared in school productions of Bugsy Malone and The Lion, the Witch and the Wardrobe. His professional acting career began when he got the role of Percy Weasley in Harry Potter in September 2000. He re-appeared in Harry Potter and the Deathly Hallows – Part 1 and Part 2, after his character's absence from Harry Potter and the Goblet of Fire and Harry Potter and the Half-Blood Prince, and only a brief non-speaking role in Harry Potter and the Order of the Phoenix.

After starring in the Harry Potter films, Rankin worked in kitchens and in a bar. In 2002 he worked as an usher at UCI Cinemas.

Rankin co-founded Painted Horse Theatre Company with Jim Rymer in 2004. On stage, Rankin has played a variety of roles in pantomimes across the country, as well as Edgar Linton in Wuthering Heights, Eilert Loevborg in Hedda Gabler, and Young Syrian in Salomé.

Rankin has also been in the TV mini-series The Rotters' Club and Channel 5's Victoria Cross Heroes in which he played Evelyn Wood. Rankin also worked as a production coordinator on Atlantis and Downton Abbey.

In 2009, Rankin starred in and produced a YouTube video titled "LifeHack", directed by TomSka, in which he played a vigilante hacker who accesses people's personal photos to find a missing woman. He also appeared as Mycroft Holmes in the Hillywood Show's Sherlock parody in 2016.

== Film, television and stage ==
Year	Title	Role	Notes
2001	Harry Potter and the Philosopher's Stone	Percy Weasley	
2002	Harry Potter and the Chamber of Secrets	Percy Weasley	
2002-2003	Jack and The Beanstalk	Jack	
2003	A Taste of Honey	Geoff	
2004	Snow White and The Seven Dwarfs		
2004	Harry Potter and the Prisoner of Azkaban	Percy Weasley	
2005	The Rotters' Club		
2006	Explode, Chapter Two: Into the Fold	Chris Haines	
2007	Harry Potter and the Order of the Phoenix	Percy Weasley	
2010	Harry Potter and the Deathly Hallows – Part 1	Percy Weasley	Uncredited cameo appearance
2011	Harry Potter and the Deathly Hallows – Part 2	Percy Weasley	
2011	Total Wipeout	Himself / Contestant	Series 5: Celebrity Special 2
2013	The Stone		Pre-production
2015	The Bastard Executioner		Assistant production coordinator
2018	The Wizard of Oz	Scarecrow	
2024	Dick Wittington	Alderman Fitzwarren	
