= Thomas Eastoe Abbott =

English poet

Thomas Eastoe Abbott (23 November 1786 – 18 February 1854) was an English poet.

== Life ==
Abbott was born and baptised in East Dereham, Norfolk, the son of John Abbott and Susannah Eastoe, who married in East Dereham on 13 November 1777.

He worked for the Inland Revenue for many years, and was a warden of the Royal Free Grammar School in Darlington. His poems were described by William Hylton Dyer Longstaffe as "written with great simplicity of language, full of genuine patriotism and Christianity; some of them much resembling in style that of Wordsworth."

Abbott died in Darlington in 1854.

== Works ==
- Peace, a lyric poem dedicated to the mayor of Hull (London, 1814).
- Resignation, a poem on the death of Princess Charlotte of Wales (Hull, 1817).
- The Triumph of Christianity, A Missionary Poem; Commerce; and other Poems, dedicated to William Wilberforce (London, 1819).
- The Soldier's Friend, a poem to the memory of the Duke of York (London, 1828).
- Lines on Education and Religion (Darlington, 1839).

== External source ==
- East Dereham parish register transcripts (www.FreeREG.org.uk)
- Thompson Cooper, Abbott, Thomas Eastoe, Rev. Megan A. Stephan, Oxford Dictionary of National Biography, Oxford University Press, 2004, accessed 21 March 2007)
