= Hunsdon =

Village in Hertfordshire, England

Coordinates: 51.808°N 0.055°E

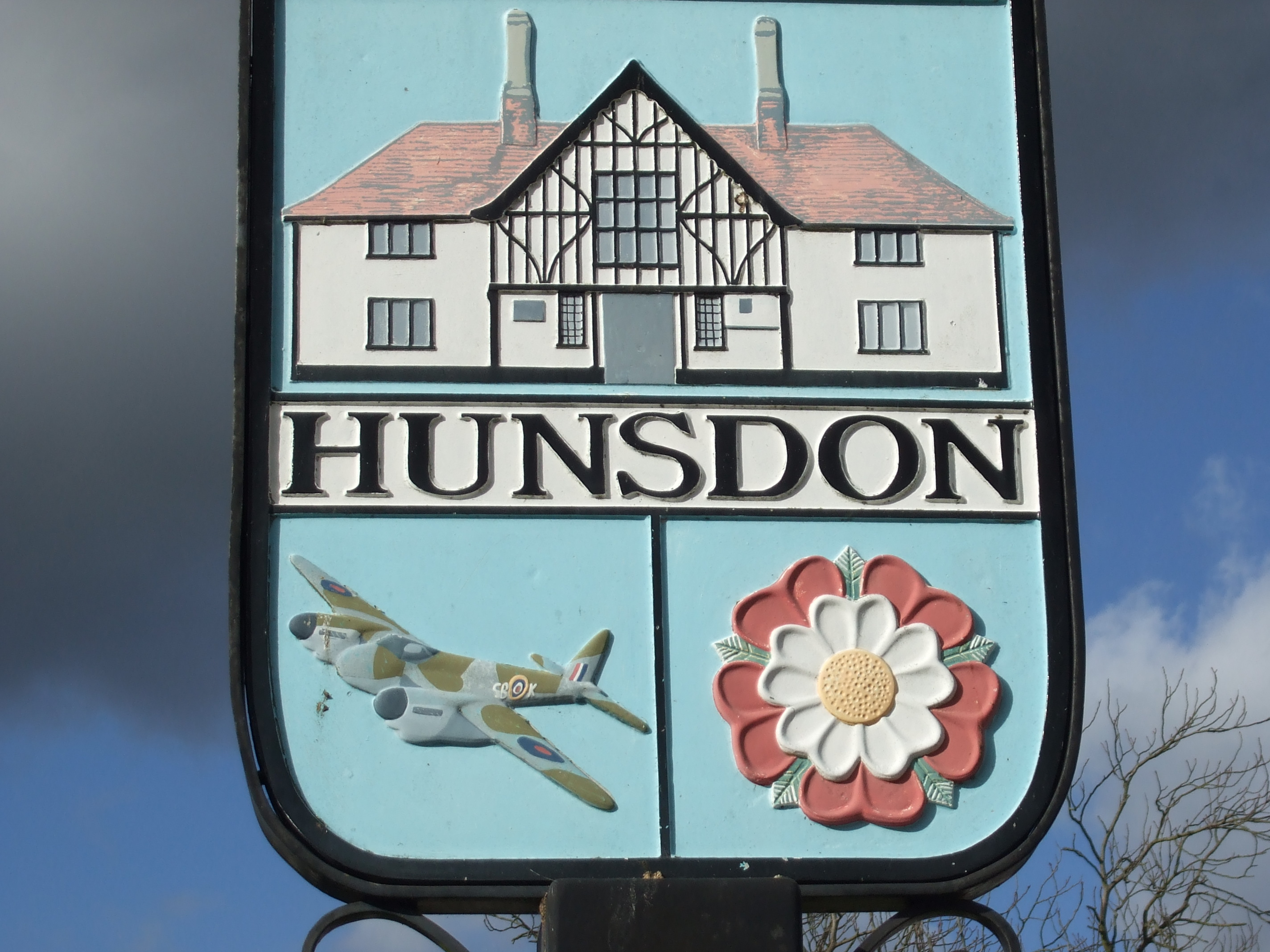
- Village sign with De Havilland Mosquito representing Hunsdon Airfield

- Location within Hertfordshire
- Population: 1,194 (Parish, 2021)
- Civil parish: Hunsdon
- District: East Hertfordshire
- Shire county: Hertfordshire
- Region: East
- Country: England
- Sovereign state: United Kingdom
- Post town: WARE
- Postcode district: SG12
- UK Parliament: Hertford and Stortford

Hunsdon is a village and civil parish in the East Hertfordshire district of Hertfordshire, England. It lies 3.5 miles (5.6 km) east of the centre of Ware, its post town, and 3 miles (5 km) north-west of the centre of Harlow. At the 2021 census the parish had a population of 1,194.

== History ==
The Domesday Book of 1086 records Hodesdone as a manor in the Braughing Hundred of Hertfordshire. At that time it was owned by a woman whose name was not recorded; she was instead identified as "Ralph Tallboys' daughter".

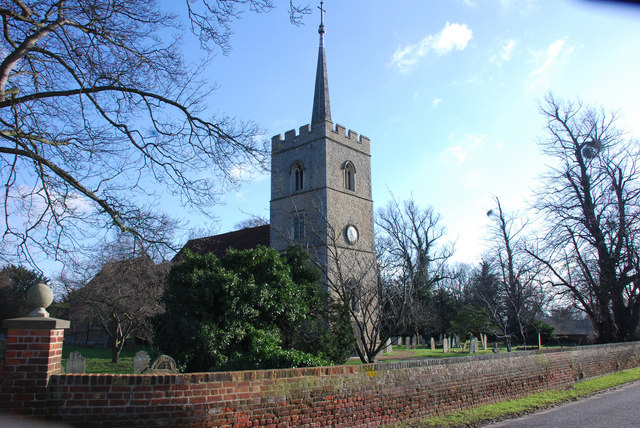
St Dunstan's Church

A priest is mentioned at Hunsdon in the Domesday Book, suggesting it was by then a parish. Hunsdon certainly had a church by 1291. The current parish church, dedicated to St Dunstan, dates from the early 14th century. It stands 0.75 miles (1.2 km) south of the main part of the village.

The church adjoins Hunsdon House, which appears to have been built in the late 1440s as a moated tower house, possibly on the site of an earlier manor house. The house has been extensively remodelled several times over its history. By 1527 the house had come to be owned by Henry VIII, who used the extensive parkland belonging to the house for hunting.

Another large country house in the parish is Briggens House, set in parkland at the southern end of the parish near the River Stort. The river forms the southern boundary of the parish and is also the county boundary with Essex. Briggens House was built around 1719 and the formal parkland around it was laid out shortly afterwards.

The main part of the village lies along the B180 road. The historic core of the village includes numerous listed buildings, and was designated a conservation area in 1968.

Hunsdon Airfield to the east of the village was built in 1941, during the Second World War, as RAF Hunsdon. After the war, military use of the airfield ceased. The airfield is now used by a local microlight club.

== Governance ==
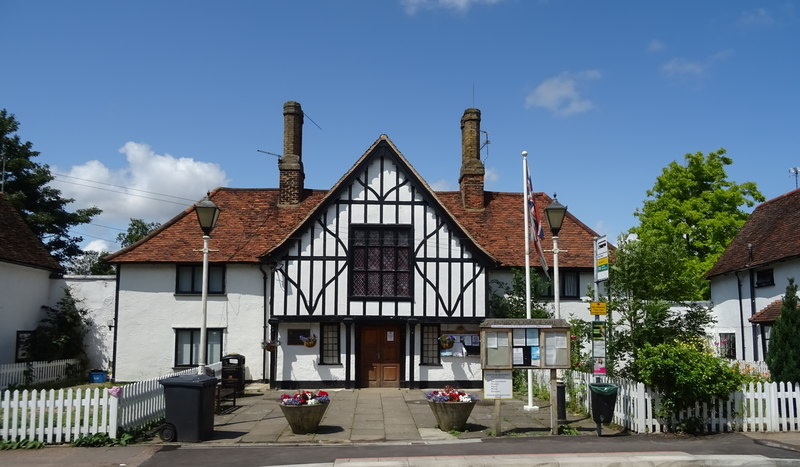
Hunsdon Village Hall

There are three tiers of local government covering Hunsdon, at parish, district and county level: Hunsdon Parish Council, East Hertfordshire District Council, and Hertfordshire County Council. The parish council meets at the Village Hall on High Street.

For national elections, the parish forms part of the Hertford and Stortford constituency.

== See also ==
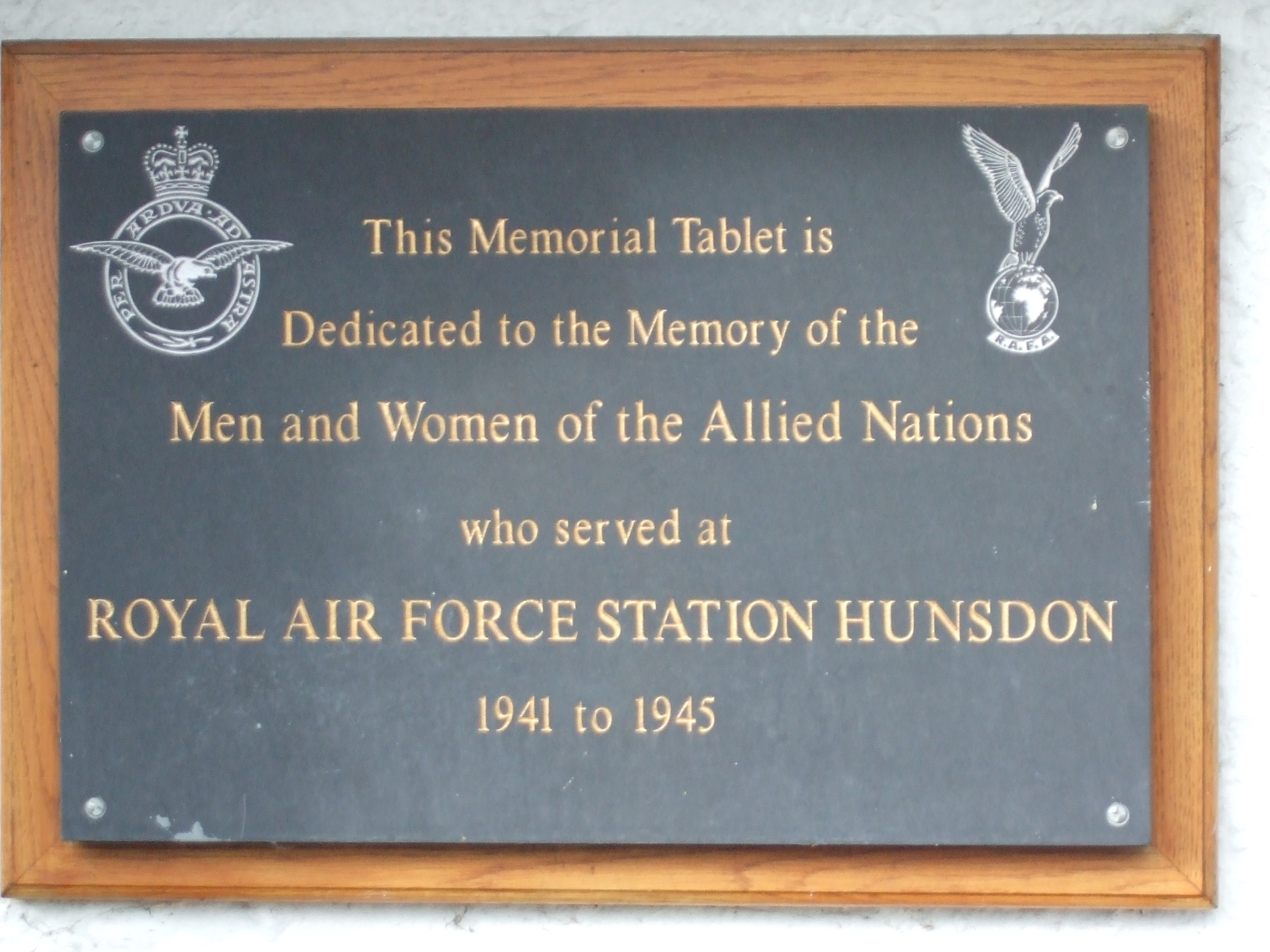
Memorial tablet on Hunsdon Village Hall

- Baron Hunsdon
- The Hundred Parishes
