= Strategic bombing during World War I =

Aspect of World War I warfare

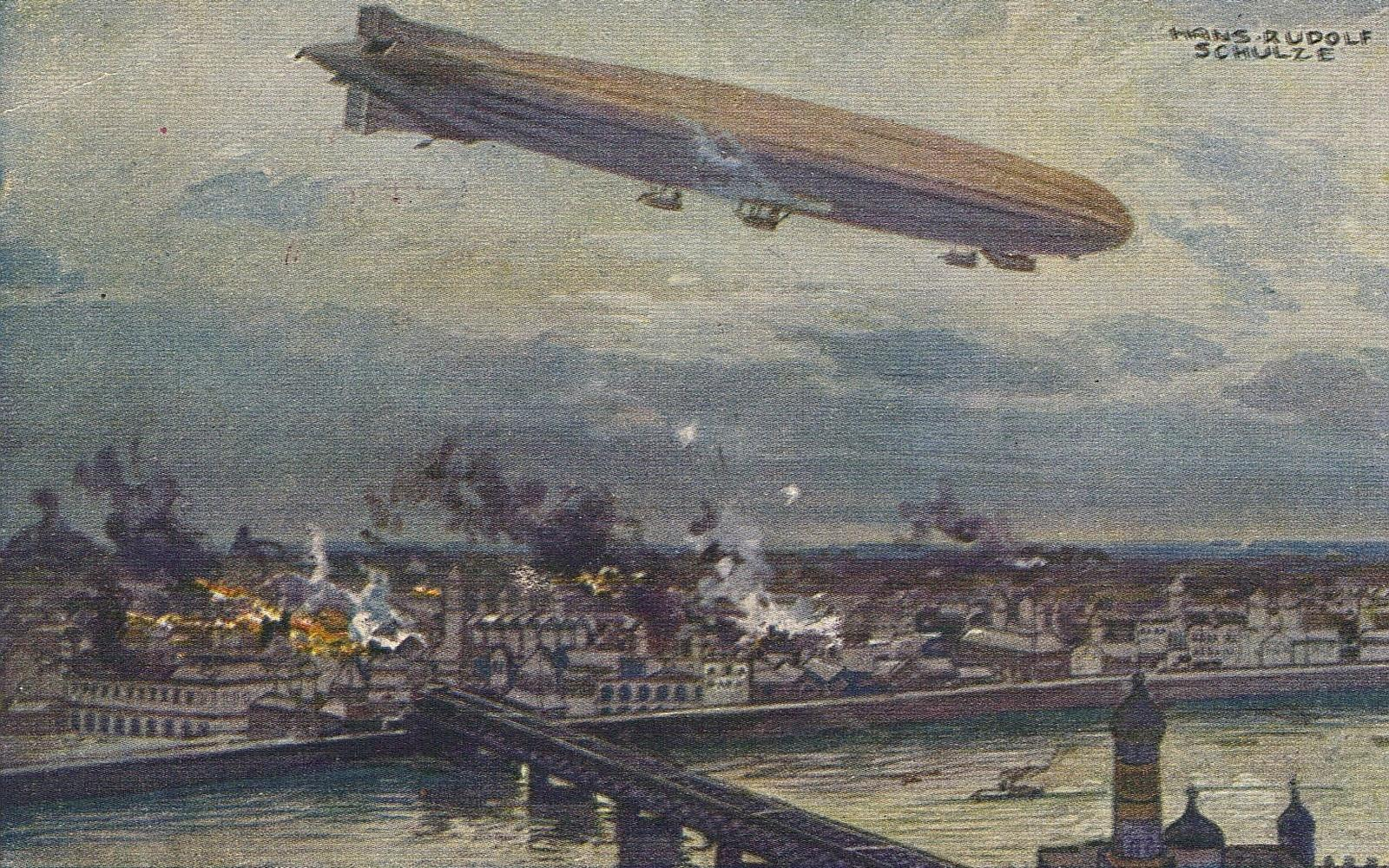
German airship Schütte Lanz SL2 bombing Warsaw in 1914

Strategic bombing during World War I (28 July 1914 – 11 November 1918) was principally carried out by the United Kingdom and France for the Entente Powers and Germany for the Central Powers. Most of the belligerents of World War I eventually engaged in some form of strategic bombing. The aerial bombing of cities, intended to destroy the enemy's morale, was introduced by the Germans in the opening days of the war. A multi-national air force to strike at Germany was planned but never materialized.

Early strategic bombing attempts led to the development of specialized bomber aircraft, during World War I. Initially bombs were dropped by hand and aimed by the naked eye, but by the end of the war bombsights had been developed. The introduction of air raid warnings and shelters can be dated to World War I, as can the design of anti-aircraft artillery and the development of methods for coordinated aerial defence. Many of the advocates of strategic bombing during the interwar period, such as Italy's Giulio Douhet, America's Billy Mitchell, and Britain's Hugh Trenchard, had commanded aircraft during World War I. The improvements in aircraft technology during and after the war convinced many that "the bomber will always get through", and this belief influenced planning for strategic bombing during World War II.

== Germany ==
The first strategic bombing in history was also the first instance of bombs being dropped on a city from the air. On 6 August 1914 a German Zeppelin bombed the Belgian city of Liège. Within the first month of the war, Germany had formed the "Ostend Carrier Pigeon Detachment", actually an airplane unit to be used for the bombing of English port cities. During the First Battle of the Marne, a German pilot flying aerial reconnaissance missions over Paris in a Taube regularly dropped bombs on the city. The first raid dropped five small bombs and a note demanding the immediate surrender of Paris and the French nation. Before the stabilisation of the Western Front, the German aircraft dropped fifty bombs on Paris, slightly damaging Notre Dame Cathedral.

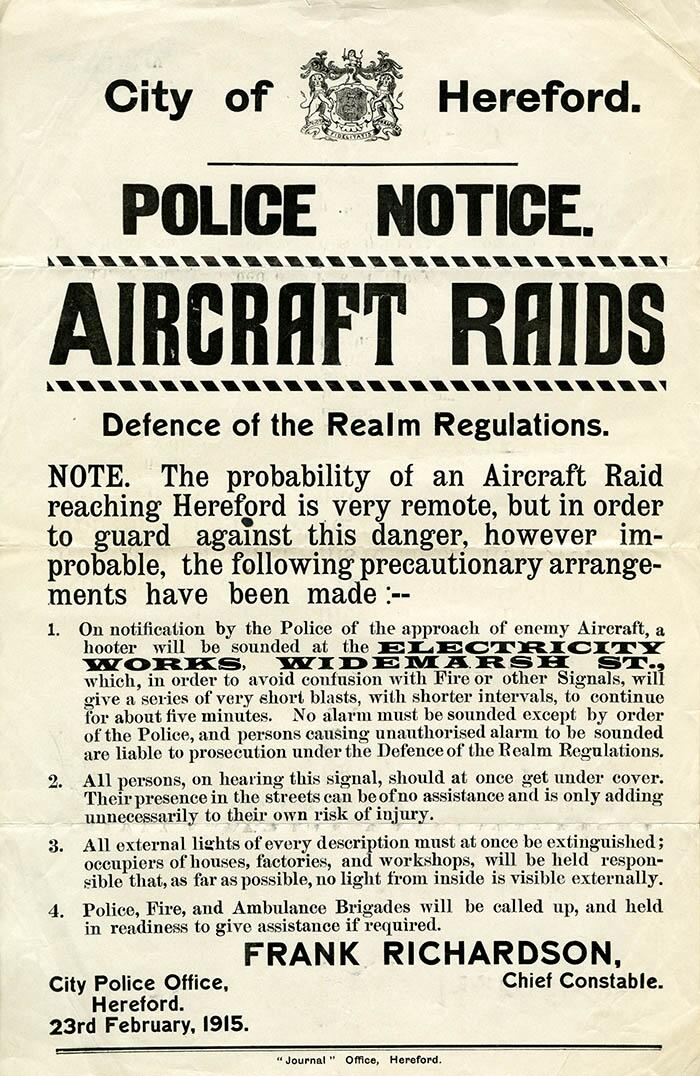
February 1915 poster warning of the possibility of air raids on the English city of Hereford

The first extended campaigns of strategic bombing were carried out against England by the German Empire's fleet of airships, which were then the only aircraft capable of such sustained activities so far from their bases. This campaign was approved on 7 January 1915 by Kaiser Wilhelm II, who forbade attacks on London, fearing that his relatives in the British royal family might be injured. These restrictions were lifted in May, after British attacks on German cities. The first attacks on England were on 19 January, and struck the Yarmouth area and King's Lynn. In Britain, fear of the Zeppelin as a weapon of war preceded its actual use: even before the war the British public was gripped by "zeppelinitis".

The Zeppelin proved too costly compared to airplanes, too large and slow a target, its hydrogen gas too flammable, and too susceptible to bad weather, anti-aircraft fire (below 5,000 feet) and interceptors armed with incendiary bullets (up to 10,000 feet) for the Imperial German Army (Reichsheer), which abandoned its use in 1916. The Imperial German Navy (Kaiserliche Marine), whose airships were primarily used for reconnaissance over the North Sea, continued to bomb the United Kingdom until 1918. In all, fifty-one raids on Great Britain were carried out, the last by the Navy in May 1918. The most intense year of the airship bombing of England was 1916. In December 1916, two Zeppelins of the R Class took off from Wainoden in an attempt to bomb Saint Petersburg. One was forced down by adverse weather conditions and damaged beyond repair, while the other, hampered by engine problems, turned back before it reached the target. No further attempt to bomb Saint Petersburg was made. Germany employed 125 airships during the war, losing more than half and sustaining a 40% attrition rate of their crews, the highest of any German service branch.

In May 1917 the Germans began using heavy bombers against England using Gotha G.IV and later supplementing these with Riesenflugzeuge ("giant aircraft"), mostly from the Zeppelin-Staaken firm. The targets of these raids were industrial and port facilities and government buildings, but few of the bombs hit military targets, most falling on private property and killing civilians. Although the German strategic bombing campaign against Britain was the most extensive of the war, it was largely ineffective, in terms of actual damage done. Only 300 tons of bombs were dropped, resulting in material damage of £2,962,111 damage, 1,414 dead and 3,416 injured, these figures including those due to shrapnel from the anti-aircraft fire. In the autumn of 1917, however, over 300,000 Londoners had taken shelter from the bombing, and industrial production had fallen.

== Britain ==
The Royal Naval Air Service (RNAS) undertook the first Entente strategic bombing missions on 22 September 1914 and 8 October, when it bombed the Zeppelin bases in Cologne and Düsseldorf. The airplanes carried twenty-pound bombs, and at least one airship was destroyed. On 21 November 1914, the RNAS flew across Lake Constance to bomb the Zeppelin factories in Friedrichshafen and Ludwigshafen. On 25 December the Cuxhaven Raid was the first attack by sea-based airplanes launched from ships against a strategic target. The RNAS also attacked Constantinople in 1915 and 1917. The aviator John Alcock was captured when he was forced to ditch on one of these missions. On 18 October 1917, the British hit a mosque and killed 54 Ottoman civilians. By the end of the war, assisted by Germany, the Ottomans had implemented an air defence system in Constantinople.

When William Weir, the President of the Air Council in 1918, told Hugh Trenchard that it was not necessary to worry about accuracy during strategic bombing raids, the general replied that "all the pilots drop their eggs into the centre of town generally." After the formation of the Royal Air Force on 1 April 1918, the British Prime Minister David Lloyd George promised to repay Germany for its air raids "with compound interest". On 19 July, the first aircraft carrier-based air raid in history, the Tondern raid, was launched against the German Zeppelin base at Tondern.

On 6 June 1918 the British formed the Independent Force under Major General Hugh Trenchard to engage in long-range bombing directed at industrial targets deep in German territory. Missions were undertaken with De Havilland DH9s and Handley Page O/400s, but the war ended before Britain's four-engined Handley Page V/1500 bomber, designed to drop 7,500 lbs on Berlin, entered service. Ultimately, retaliatory bombings on German cities provoked German retaliation against not British but French cities, which led to disagreement between British and French leadership concerning the strategy of such bombing and allocation of resources away from the Western Front. The British dropped 660 tons of bombs on Germany, more than twice what Germany had managed to drop on England. The first raid against Berlin, scheduled for November, was cancelled with the armistice.

== France ==
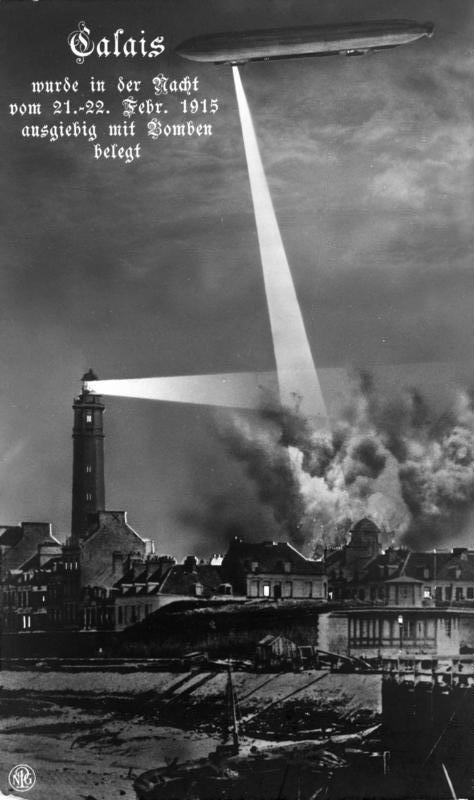
German airship bombing Calais on the night of 21–22 February 1915

France formed a strategic bombing unit, the Groupe de Bombardement No. 1 (GB1), in September 1914. The French were reluctant to bomb targets on their own soil, even if occupied by the Germans, and were more wary of German retaliation than the British, because French cities were within range of German bombers. Nevertheless, GB1 raided far behind the front, concentrating on the German supply network and troop concentrations, a strategy designed to directly aid the French Army on the Western Front. The French favoured light bombers, often modifying reconnaissance craft for the purpose. The Breguet 14 of 1917 remained in production until 1926.

On 4 December 1914 French pilots carried out the first Entente bombing of a city when they dropped bombs on Freiburg im Breisgau.

== Italy ==
On 1 November 1911, during the Italo-Turkish War, the Kingdom of Italy had carried out the first aerial military mission in history, when Giulio Gavotti dropped bombs by hand on Turkish positions in the Libyan desert. During World War I Italy, like France, did not wish to bomb centres of civilian population, because many of the obvious targets had a high number of Italian residents or were in territories Italy had plans to annex after the war. Like Russia, Italy possessed heavy bombers before its entry into the war, Giovanni Caproni having built the multi-engine Caproni Ca.1 in 1914 which carried four modest bombs.

In August 1915, the Ca.1s were placed in the 21° Squadriglia of the Corpo Aeronautico Militare. In October–November 1915, the Ca.1s attacked Austro-Hungarian railroads and supply depots. Later in the war, photographic reconnaissance and offensive actions were conducted by Ansaldo SVA aircraft, which launched a four-aircraft strike from Ponte San Pietro against Innsbruck on 28 February 1918, strafing and bombing railroad marshalling yards. Innsbruck, along with Bolzano, was again the target of an air strike by SVA bombers on 29 October 1918.

Gabriele D'Annunzio's flight over Vienna in August 1918 dropped only leaflets threatening to return with bombs. No second raid occurred before the end of the war.

== Russia ==
The Russian Empire possessed the only long-range heavy bomber to be operational in the first year of the war, the Sikorsky Ilya Muromets (IM). This could carry 1,100 lbs of bombs, and remain in the air for up five hours with a reduced bomb load. In August 1914 the Russians grouped their four Sikorskys in a unit dedicated to strategic bombing and based them near Warsaw in December. Cities were not the main targets on the Eastern Front: the principal targets were supply depots, troop concentrations and transportation networks, especially railway yards and stations. By March 1918, when Russia left the war, around seventy Ilya Muromets had been constructed, and they had flown over 350 bombing or reconnaissance missions along the entire Eastern Front.

In August 1915, Russian aircraft bombed Constantinople, killing 41 Ottoman citizens.

== Austria-Hungary ==
Strategic bombing by Austria-Hungary was limited, mostly confined to Italian targets on the Adriatic. Nonetheless, Austro-Hungarian pilots based at Pula flew forty-two bombing missions over Venice after the Italian Front had advanced to within a few miles of the city. The Chiesa degli Scalzi, near the Ferrovia train station, was damaged, including two ceiling frescoes by Giovanni Battista Tiepolo. A particularly severe raid was carried out on 27 February 1918, hitting central Venice and sending many Venetians to take refuge in Giudecca and the Lido. A letter from Ralph Curtis to Isabella Stewart Gardner written in September 1915 explains how the Venetians instituted blackout during the bombings:

The mosquitos from Pula come buzzing over nearly every fine night, and drop bombs for half an hour or so. . . . Venice is like a lovely prima donna in deep mourning. All the gilded angels wear sack-cloth painted dirty grey. Anything that shines is covered. At night all is as black as in the dark ages. "Serrenos" call out "all is well" every half-hour. But when danger is signalled the elec[tric] light is cut off, sirens blow, cannon firebombs explode and the whole city shakes on its piles. All the hotels but the Danieli's are hospitals.

The Venetian writer Alvise Zorzi attributes "the final rupture of the continuity of Venetian customs and culture" to the Austro-Hungarian bombing campaign.

== Bibliography ==
- Cole, Christopher; Cheeseman, E. F. (1984). The Air Defence of Britain, 1914–1918. London: Putnam. ISBN 0-370-30538-8.
- Doody, Margaret (2007). Tropic of Venice. Philadelphia: University of Pennsylvania Press. ISBN 978-0-81223-984-3.
- Harvey, A. D. (2000). "Bombing and the Air War on the Italian Front, 1915–1918". Air Power History. 47 (3): 34–39.
- Gray, Peter; Thetford, Owen (1962). German Aircraft of the First World War. London: Putnam. OCLC 2310617.
- Gregory, Adrian (2016). "Imperial Capitals at War: A Comparative Perspective". The London Journal. 41 (3): 219–232. doi:10.1080/03058034.2016.1216757. S2CID 159919691.
- Lamberton, William Melville (1962). Reconnaissance and Bomber Aircraft of the 1914–1918 War. Aero Publishers. OCLC 462209026.
- Madison, Rodney (2005). "Air Warfare, Strategic Bombing". The Encyclopedia of World War I: A Political, Social and Military History. Vol. 1. Santa Barbara: ABC-CLIO. pp. 45–46. ISBN 1851094202.
- Robinson, Douglas H. (1971). The Zeppelin in Combat (3rd ed.). Henley-on-Thames: Foulis. ISBN 0-85429-130-X.
- Tilford, Earl H. Jr. (1996). "Air Warfare: Strategic Bombing". The European Powers in the First World War: An Encyclopedia. Santa Barbara: ABC-CLIO. pp. 13–15. ISBN 0-81533-351-X.
