= List of schools in Norfolk =

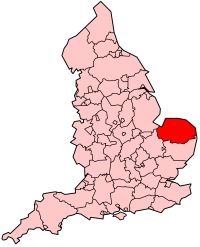
The county of Norfolk.

This is a list of schools in Norfolk, England.

See also Norfolk County Council.

== State-funded schools ==
- Acle St Edmunds
- Admirals Academy,
- Alburgh with Denton CE Primary Academy,
- Aldborough Primary School
- All Saints Academy,
- All Saints CE Primary School Stibbard
- All Saints CE Primary School,
- Alpington and Bergh Apton CE Primary School,
- Angel Road Infant School,
- Angel Road Junior School,
- Antingham and Southrepps Primary School,
- Arden Grove Infant and Nursery School,
- Ashill Primary School,
- Ashleigh Primary School,
- Ashwicken CE Primary School,
- Aslacton Primary School,
- Astley Primary School,
- Attleborough Primary School,
- Avenue Junior School,
- Bacton Primary School,
- Banham Primary School,
- Barford Primary School,
- Barnham Broom CE Voluntary Aided Primary School,
- The Bawburgh School,
- Bawdeswell Community Primary School,
- Beeston Primary School,
- The Belfry CE Primary School,
- Bignold Primary School and Nursery,
- The Bishops CE Primary School,
- Blakeney CE Voluntary Aided Primary School,
- Blenheim Park Academy,
- Blofield Primary School
- Bluebell Primary School
- Bressingham Primary School
- Brisley CE Primary Academy,
- Brooke Voluntary Controlled CE Primary School,
- Brundall Primary School,
- Bunwell Primary School,
- Bure Valley School,
- Burnham Market Primary and Nursery School,
- Burston Community Primary School,
- Buxton Primary School,
- Caister Infant With Nursery School,
- Caister Junior School,
- Carleton Rode CE Voluntary Aided Primary School,
- Castle Acre CE Primary Academy,
- Caston CE Primary Academy,
- Catfield CofE Primary Academy,
- Catton Grove Primary School,
- Cawston CE Primary Academy,
- Cecil Gowing Infant School,
- Chapel Break Infant School,
- Charles Darwin Primary School,
- Cherry Tree Academy Trust Marham Infant,
- Cherry Tree Academy Trust Marham Junior,
- Clenchwarton Primary School,
- Clover Hill VA Infant and Nursery School,
- Cobholm Primary Academy,
- Colby Primary School,
- Colkirk CE Primary Academy,
- Colman Infant School,
- Colman Junior School,
- Coltishall Primary School,
- Corpusty Primary School,
- Costessey Primary School,
- Cringleford CE VA Primary School,
- Cringleford Prep,
- Cromer Junior School,
- Denver Voluntary Controlled Primary School,
- Dereham CE Infant and Nursery Academy,
- Dereham CE Junior Academy,
- Dereham Toftwood Community Junior School,
- Dersingham Primary School,
- Dickleburgh CE Primary Academy,
- Diss CE Junior Academy,
- Diss Infant Academy and Nursery,
- Ditchingham CE Primary Academy,
- Docking CE Primary Academy and Nursery,
- Downham Market Hillcrest Primary School,
- Drake Primary School,
- Drayton CofE Junior School,
- Drayton Community Infant School,
- Duchy of Lancaster Methwold CofE Primary School,
- Dussindale Primary School,
- Earsham CE Primary Academy,
- East Harling Primary School and Nursery,
- East Ruston Infant School & Nursery,
- Eastgate Academy,
- Eaton Primary School,
- Edith Cavell Academy and Nursery,
- Edmund de Moundeford VC Primary School, Feltwell
- Edward Worlledge Ormiston Academy,
- Ellingham VC Primary School,
- Emneth Academy,
- Erpingham Voluntary Controlled CE Primary School,
- Fairhaven CE Voluntary Aided Primary School,
- Fairstead Community Primary and Nursery School,
- Fakenham Infant and Nursery School,
- Fakenham Junior School,
- Falcon Junior School,
- Filby Primary School,
- Firside Junior School,
- Fleggburgh CofE Primary School,
- Flitcham CE Primary Academy,
- Forncett St Peter CE Voluntary Aided Primary School,
- Foulsham Primary School Academy,
- The Free School Norwich,
- Freethorpe Community Primary and Nursery School,
- Frettenham Primary School,
- Garboldisham CE Primary Academy,
- Garrick Green Infant School,
- Garvestone Community Primary School,
- Gayton CE Primary Academy,
- Gaywood Primary School,
- George White Junior School,
- Ghost Hill Infant and Nursery School,
- Gillingham St Michael's CE Primary Academy,
- Glebeland Community Primary School,
- Gooderstone CE Primary Academy,
- Great Ellingham Primary School,
- Great Hockham Primary School and Nursery,
- Great Massingham CofE Primary School,
- Great Witchingham CE Primary Academy,
- Great Yarmouth Primary Academy and Nursery,
- Greenpark Academy,
- Gresham Village School and Nursery,
- Greyfriars Academy,
- Grove House Infant and Nursery School,
- Hainford VC Primary School,
- Happisburgh CE Primary Academy,
- Hapton CE Voluntary Aided Primary School,
- The Harleston Sancroft Academy,
- Harpley CofE VC Primary School,
- Heacham Infant and Nursery School,
- Heacham Junior School,
- Heartsease Primary Academy,
- Heartwood CE Primary School,
- Heather Avenue Infant School,
- Hemblington Primary School,
- Hempnall Primary School,
- Hemsby Primary School,
- Henderson Green Primary School
- Hethersett Primary School,
- Hethersett Woodside Primary School,
- Hevingham Primary School,
- Hickling CE Infant School,
- Highgate Infant School,
- Hilgay Riverside Academy,
- Hillcrest Primary School,
- Hillside Avenue Primary School,
- Hillside Primary School,
- Hindringham CE Primary School,
- Hingham Primary School,
- Hockering CE Primary Academy,
- Holly Meadows School,
- Holt Community Primary School,
- Holy Cross CE Primary School,
- Homefield CE Primary School,
- Hopton CE Primary Academy,
- Horning Community Primary School,
- Horsford CE Primary School,
- Howard Junior School,
- Hunstanton Primary School,
- Iceni Academy,
- Ingoldisthorpe CE Primary School,
- John of Gaunt Infant School,
- Kelling CE Primary School,
- Kenninghall Primary School,
- King's Oak Academy,
- King's Park Infant School,
- Kinsale Infant School,
- Kinsale Junior School,
- Lakenham Primary School,
- Langham Village School,
- Lingwood Primary Academy,
- Lionwood Infant School,
- Lionwood Junior School,
- Litcham School
- Little Melton Primary School,
- Little Plumstead CE Primary Academy,
- Little Snoring Community Primary Academy,
- Loddon Infant School,
- Loddon Junior School,
- Lodge Lane Infant School,
- Ludham Primary Schooly,
- Lyng CE Primary Academy,
- Magdalen Academy,
- Magdalen Gates Primary School
- Manor Field Infant School
- Marshland St James Primary School,
- Martham Academy,
- Mattishall Primary School,
- Middleton CE Primary Academy,
- Mile Cross Primary School,
- Millfield Primary School,
- Moorlands CE Primary Academy,
- Morley CE Primary Academy,
- Mousehold Infant School,
- Mulbarton Primary School,
- Mundesley Infant School,
- Mundesley Junior School,
- Mundford CE Primary Academy,
- Narborough CE Primary Academy,
- Neatishead CE Primary School,
- Necton Primary School,
- Nelson Academy,
- Nelson Infant School,
- Newton Flotman Primary School,
- Nightingale Infant School,
- The Norman CE Primary School,
- North Denes Primary School,
- North Elmham CE Primary School,
- North Walsham Infant School,
- North Walsham Junior School,
- North Wootton Academy,
- Northgate Primary School,
- Northrepps Primary School,
- Norwich Primary Academy,
- Norwich Road Academy,
- Old Buckenham Primary School,
- Old Catton CE Junior School,
- Ormesby Village Infant School,
- Ormesby Village Junior School,
- Ormiston Cliff Park Primary Academy,
- Ormiston Herman Academy,
- Parker's CE Primary Academy,
- Peterhouse CE Primary Academy,
- Preston CE Primary School,
- Pulham CE Primary School,
- Queen's Hill Primary School,
- Queensway Infant Academy,
- Queensway Junior Academy
- Rackheath Primary School,
- Raleigh Infant Academy,
- Recreation Road Infant School,
- Redcastle Family School,
- Reedham Primary School,
- Reepham Primary School,
- Reffley Academy,
- Robert Kett Primary School,
- Rockland St Mary Primary School,
- Rocklands Community Primary School,
- Rollesby Primary School,
- Rosecroft Primary School,
- Roydon Primary School,
- Rudham CE Primary Academy,
- Sacred Heart
- St Andrew's CE Primary School,
- St Augustine's RC Primary School,
- St Clements Hill Primary Academy
- St Faiths' CE Primary School,
- St Francis of Assisi RC Primary School,
- St George's Primary School,
- St Germans Academy
- St John's Community Primary School,
- St Martha's RC Primary School,
- St Martin's at Shouldham CE Primary School
- St Mary and St Peter RC Primary School,
- St Mary's CE Junior School,
- St Mary's CE Primary School,
- St Mary's Community Primary School,
- St Michael's CE Primary Academy,
- St Michael's CE Primary School,
- St Michael's Junior School,
- St Nicholas Priory CE Primary School,
- St Peter and St Paul CE Primary Academy,
- St Peter's CE Primary Academy,
- St William's Primary School,
- Salhouse CE Primary School,
- Sandringham and West Newton CE Primary Academy,
- Saxlingham Nethergate CE Primary School,
- Scarning Primary School,
- Scole CE Primary School,
- Sculthorpe CE Primary Academy,
- Seething and Mundham Primary School,
- Sheringham Community Primary School,
- Snettisham Primary School,
- South Wootton Infant School,
- South Wootton Junior School,
- Southery Academy,
- Southtown Primary School,
- Sparhawk Infant School,
- Spixworth Infant School,
- Spooner Row Primary School,
- Sporle CE Primary Academy,
- Sprowston Infant School,
- Sprowston Junior School,
- Stalham Academy,
- Stalham Infant School,
- Stoke Holy Cross Primary School,
- Stradbroke Primary Academy,
- Suffield Park Infant School,
- Surlingham Primary School,
- Sutton CE Infant School,
- Swaffham CE Primary Academy,
- Swanton Abbott Community Primary School,
- Swanton Morley Primary School,
- Tacolneston CE Primary Academy,
- Taverham CE Junior School,
- Ten Mile Bank Riverside Academy,
- Terrington St Clement Community School,
- Terrington St John Primary School,
- Thomas Bullock CE Primary Academy,
- Thompson Primary School,
- Thurlton Primary School,
- Thurton Primary School,
- Tilney All Saints CE Primary School,
- Tilney St Lawrence Community Primary School,
- Tivetshall Community Primary School,
- Toftwood Infant School,
- Trowse Primary School,
- Tuckswood Academy,
- Tunstead Primary School,
- Upwell Academy,
- Valley Primary Academy,
- Walpole Cross Keys Primary School,
- Walpole Highway Primary School,
- Walsingham CE Primary School,
- Watlington Community Primary School,
- Watton Junior School,
- Watton Westfield Infant School,
- Weeting CE Primary School,
- Wells-next-the-Sea Primary School,
- Wensum Junior School, Norwich
- West Earlham Infant School,
- West Earlham Junior School,
- West Lynn Primary School,
- West Walton Community Primary School,
- West Winch Primary School,
- White House Farm Primary School,
- White Woman Lane Junior School,
- Whitefriars CE Primary Academy,
- Wicklewood Primary School,
- Wimbotsham and Stow Academy,
- Winterton Primary School,
- Woodland View Junior School,
- Woodlands Primary Academy,
- Woodton Primary School,
- Worstead CE Primary School,
- Wreningham Primary School,
- Wroughton Infant Academy,
- Wroughton Junior Academy,
- Wymondham College Prep School,
- Yaxham CE Primary School,

=== Secondary schools ===
- Acle Academy, Acle
- Alderman Peel High School, Wells-next-the-Sea
- Attleborough Academy, Attleborough
- Aylsham High School, Aylsham
- Broadland High Ormiston Academy, Hoveton
- Caister Academy, Caister-on-Sea
- City Academy Norwich, Norwich
- City of Norwich School, Norwich
- Cliff Park Ormiston Academy, Gorleston-on-Sea
- Cromer Academy, Cromer
- Dereham Neatherd High School, Dereham
- Diss High School, Diss
- Downham Market Academy, Downham Market
- Fakenham Academy, Fakenham
- Flegg High Ormiston Academy, Martham
- Framingham Earl High School, Framingham Earl
- Great Yarmouth Charter Academy, Great Yarmouth
- Harleston Sancroft Academy, Harleston
- Hellesdon High School, Hellesdon
- Hethersett Academy, Hethersett
- The Hewett Academy, Norwich
- Hobart High School, Loddon
- Iceni Academy, Methwold
- Jane Austen College, Norwich
- King Edward VII Academy, King's Lynn
- King's Lynn Academy, King's Lynn
- Litcham School, Litcham
- Long Stratton High School, Long Stratton
- Lynn Grove Academy, Gorleston-on-Sea
- Marshland High School, West Walton
- The Nicholas Hamond Academy, Swaffham
- North Walsham High School, North Walsham
- Northgate High School, Dereham
- Notre Dame High School, Norwich
- Old Buckenham High School, Old Buckenham
- Open Academy, Norwich
- Ormiston Venture Academy, Great Yarmouth
- Ormiston Victory Academy, Costessey
- Reepham High School and College, Reepham
- St Clement's High School, Terrington St Clement
- Sewell Park Academy, Norwich
- Sheringham High School, Sheringham
- Smithdon High School, Hunstanton
- Springwood High School, King's Lynn
- Sprowston Community Academy, Sprowston
- Stalham High School, Stalham
- Taverham High School, Taverham
- Thetford Academy, Thetford
- Thorpe St Andrew School, Thorpe St Andrew
- University Technical College Norfolk, Norwich
- Wayland Academy, Watton
- Wymondham College, Morley
- Wymondham High Academy, Wymondham

=== Special and alternative schools ===
- The Bridge Easton, Easton
- Bure Park Specialist Academy, Great Yarmouth
- Chapel Green School, Old Buckenham
- Churchill Park School, King's Lynn
- The Clare School, Norwich
- Duke of Lancaster Academy, Fakenham
- Eaton Hall Specialist Academy, Norwich
- The Fen Rivers Academy, King's Lynn
- Fred Nicholson School, East Dereham
- Hall School, Norwich
- Harford Manor School, Norwich
- John Grant School, Great Yarmouth
- The Parkside Special School, Norwich
- The Pinetree School, Thetford
- Sheringham Woodfields School, Sheringham
- Short Stay School for Norfolk, Norwich
- Sidestrand Hall School, Sidestrand
- The Wherry School, Norwich

=== Further education ===
- Dereham Sixth Form College
- East Norfolk Sixth Form College
- Easton & Otley College
- Great Yarmouth College
- Norwich City College
- Paston College
- Sir Isaac Newton Sixth Form
- The College of West Anglia

== Independent schools ==
=== Primary and preparatory schools ===
- Beeston Hall School, West Runton
- Downham Preparatory School, Stow Bardolph
- Glebe House School, Hunstanton
- Langley Preparatory School, Taverham
- Notre Dame Preparatory School, Norwich
- Town Close School, Norwich

=== Senior and all-through schools ===
- All Saints School, Lessingham
- Gresham's School, Holt
- Langley School, Loddon
- Norwich High School for Girls, Norwich
- Norwich School, Norwich
- Norwich Steiner School, Norwich
- OneSchool Global UK, Swaffham
- Thetford Grammar School, Thetford

=== Special and alternative schools ===
- Acorn Park School, Banham
- Argyll House, Cromer
- Aurora Eccles School, Quidenham
- Aurora White House School, Attleborough
- Avocet House, Heckingham
- Banks House School, Norwich
- Community-Ed Academy, Gorleston-on-Sea
- Compass Community School Eld Park, Thetford
- The Damara School, Thetford
- Future Education, Norwich
- Include Schools Norfolk, Norwich
- Kingsbrook School, Thetford
- The Lighthouse, Easton
- Novaturient School, Great Yarmouth
- Red Balloon Learner Centre, Norwich
- St Andrew's School, Aylmerton
- Sheridan House School, Northwold
- The Stables Independent School, Brumstead
- Turnstone House School, Kirby Cane
- Westfield House School, Terrington St Clement
