= West Norfolk Academies Trust =

Multi-academy trust in West Norfolk

- Abbreviation: WNAT
- Type: MAT
- Registration no.: 07546118
- Legal status: Charity
- Purpose: Primary and secondary education
- Region served: King's Lynn and West Norfolk
- Official language: English
- Website: westnorfolkacademiestrust.co.uk

West Norfolk Academies Trust is a multi-academy trust, serving schools in or close to King's Lynn, Norfolk.

== Primary academies ==
- Clenchwarton Primary
- West Lynn Primary
- Snettisham Primary
- Heacham Junior
- Heacham Infants
- Walpole Cross Keys Primary
- Gaywood Primary

== Secondary academies ==
- St Clement's High School, Terrington St Clement
- Smithdon High School, Hunstanton
- Marshland High School, West Walton
- Springwood High School, Gaywood
