= Saint Clement School =

The name Saint Clement School may refer to:

- Saint Clement School (Massachusetts), was a private, Roman Catholic secondary school in Medford, Massachusetts
- St. Clement Elementary/Junior High School, a school in Edmonton, Alberta, Canada
- St. Clement School, of the Saint Clement Catholic Church, Chicago
- St Clement's High School, a coeducational secondary school located in the village of Terrington St Clement, in the English county of Norfolk
- St. Clement's School, an Anglican independent school for girls in Toronto, Ontario, Canada
- St. Clements University, a higher education institution registered in the Turks and Caicos Islands
- Saint Clement High School, former school in Center Line, Michigan
