= Downham Market Leisure Centre =

English leisure centre

- Location within Norfolk

General information
- Location: Downham Market Leisure Centre; Bexwell Road; Downham Market; Norfolk; PE38 9LL, Downham Market, Norfolk, United Kingdom
- Coordinates: 52.603106°N 0.388153°E
- Owner: Borough Council of King's Lynn & West Norfolk

Website
- Downham Market Leisure Centre

Downham Market Leisure Centre, located on the Downham Market High School site , is a leisure centre owned by The Borough Council of King's Lynn & West Norfolk. The leisure centre is located on Bexwell Road, Downham Market, and is shared with Downham Market High School which is situated on the same site.

== History ==
In 2003, Downham Market Leisure Centre had a new swimming pool built which replaced the old pool on the Memorial Field, Lynn Road. The original swimming pool was an open-air pool built in the 1960s, before having a roof added. The Memorial Field now contains two squash courts and various other sports facilities including cricket.

The current swimming pool is a 25m x 10.5m wide deck level pool that offers suitable facilities for all users. In 2009, Downham Market Leisure Centre underwent refurbishment in which the primary gym was extended and refurbished. The previous equipment was donated to Downham Market High School. Also in 2009 saw the building of the MUGA (Multi-Use Games Area), which allows for a variation of sports to be played in a small area. The MUGA is located behind Downham Market High School, and is used by the school for physical education.
