= Extra-parochial area =

Geographic area of England outside any ecclesiastical or civil parish

- Also known as: Extra-parochial place; Extra-parochial district
- Location: England and Wales
- Created: Mostly in antiquity
- Abolished by: Extra-Parochial Places Act 1857; Poor Law Amendment Act 1868
- Abolished: 1858 / 1868
- Number: 686 (as of 19th century)

In England and Wales, an extra-parochial area, extra-parochial place or extra-parochial district was a geographically defined area considered to be outside any ecclesiastical or civil parish. Anomalies in the parochial system meant they had no church or clergymen and were therefore exempt from payment of poor or church rates and usually tithes. They were formed for a variety of reasons, often because an area was unpopulated or unsuitable for agriculture, but also around institutions and buildings or natural resources. Extra-parochial areas caused considerable problems when they became inhabited as they did not provide religious facilities, local governance or provide for the relief of the poor. Their status was often ambiguous and there was demand for extra-parochial areas to operate more like parishes. Following the introduction of the New Poor Law, extra-parochial areas were effectively made civil parishes by the Extra-Parochial Places Act 1857 and were eliminated by the Poor Law Amendment Act 1868. This was achieved either by being integrated with a neighbouring or surrounding parish, or by becoming a separate civil parish if the population was high enough.

== Formation ==
Extra-parochial areas formed in every county in England for a number of reasons. Often they were remote areas without population or areas covered by a particular resource such as commons, woodlands and fenlands. The names of some former extra-parochial areas such as Nowhere, Norfolk; Nomansland, Devon; and No Man's Heath, Warwickshire point to their isolation. Early institutions such as hospitals, almshouses and leper colonies were often made to be extra-parochial, as were houses of the gentry, depopulated villages, cathedral closes, castle grounds, Oxbridge colleges, and the Inns of Court.

Later the lack of parochial administration, including policing, would cause extra-parochial places to be used for the non-conformist religious congregation and Chartism meetings. Examples include the precincts of Chester Castle, Westminster Abbey and Windsor Castle. Others were created for individual reasons such as Rothley Temple which was used by the Knights Templar and Old Sarum which was an abandoned settlement. The Army Chaplains Act 1868 allowed the creation of extra-parochial districts outside normal ecclesiastical administration of the Church of England for the purposes of churches on army bases.

== Problems ==
The administration of the Old Poor Law caused particular problems for people from or resident in extra-parochial areas. The Poor Relief Act 1662 meant that poor relief could only be received from a parish of settlement, where a person was born or normally located. This excluded residents of extra-parochial places from the welfare system. In some cases relief was funded from the county rate, elsewhere a neighbouring parish provided support, and in a very limited number of extra-parochial places, there was provision of poor relief by overseers. However, the legal status of these areas regarding poor relief remained ambiguous. The New Poor Law presented different problems as parishes were grouped into poor law unions it was unclear what and how a contribution should be made from extra-parochial areas. It was also unclear what rights the justices of the peace had to sit on a board of guardians. The problems of these areas relating to the administration of poor relief were exacerbated as the extra-parochial nature of the places attracted vulnerable people such as single women who wished to give birth there in order to avoid illegitimacy law, registration costs and parish settlement of their children by birth. Aside from the Poor Law and civil administration, the nature of extra-parochial places caused other problems, such as rents being disproportionately high. In 1844, there were 575 extra-parochial places exempt from poor rates, with a combined population of 104,533 and area of 247,208 acres (100,042 ha). An 1850 report listed those which were liable to the county rate.

== Conversion to parishes ==
Extra-Parochial Places Act 1857 (Note: The citation of this act by this short title was authorised by section 1(1) of, and the first schedule to, the Short Titles Act 1892. Due to the repeal of those provisions it is now authorised by section 19(2) of the Interpretation Act 1978.)
- Act of Parliament
- Parliament of the United Kingdom
- Long title: An Act to provide for the Relief of the Poor in Extra-parochial Places.
- Citation: 20 Vict. c. 19
- Territorial extent: United Kingdom

Dates
- Royal assent: 21 March 1857
- Commencement: 1 January 1858 (Note: Section 1.)
- Repealed: 27 June 1974
Other legislation
Amended by	Rating and Valuation Act 1925; Marriage Act 1949
Repealed by	Statute Law (Repeals) Act 1974
Relates to	Poor Law Amendment Act 1834

Status: Repealed

Text of statute as originally enacted

Because it was problematic for communities to be without religious provision or the usual structures of local governance there were demands to make extra-parochial areas operate in the same way as parishes or for them to become part of an adjoining parish. The status of some extra-parochial areas was called into question, contested or at least ambiguous. Because of shifts in population, it had become necessary to divide, merge and otherwise alter ancient parishes and for them to diverge for ecclesiastical and civil purposes. Some extra-parochial areas were absorbed by new parishes as part of this process.

The Extra-Parochial Places Act 1857 (20 Vict. c. 19) from 1 January 1858 effectively turned extra-parochial places into civil parishes, providing for poor relief, poor rates, police rates, burial, and registration. Overseers could be appointed from an adjoining parish if no inhabitant was suitable. A local act could be used to join the extra-parochial area to a poor law union or parish if the guardians agreed. It was also possible for the extra-parochial place to be merged with another parish if a majority of landowners and occupiers agreed.

After the 31st of December 1857, every place entered separately in the Report of the Registrar General on the last Census which now is or is reputed to be extra-parochial, and wherein no rate is levied for the relief of the poor, shall for all the purposes of the assessment to the poor rate, the relief of the poor, the county, police, or borough rate, the burial of the dead, the removal of nuisances, the registration of parliamentary and municipal voters, and the registration of births and deaths, be deemed a parish for such purposes, and shall be designated by the name which is assigned to it in such report; and the justices of the peace having jurisdiction over such place, or over the greater part thereof, shall appoint overseers of the poor therein; and with respect to any other place being or reputed to be extra-parochial and wherein no rate is levied for the relief of the poor, such justices may appoint overseers of the poor therein, notwithstanding anything contained in the 7 & 8 Vict c 101. — Extra-Parochial Places Act 1857

The legislation was almost prevented from passing by the influential barristers of the Inns of Court who were able to secure a special provision to ensure Gray's Inn, Inner Temple, and Middle Temple could not be grouped into any poor law union, although they were otherwise considered to be parishes. This provision was also made for Charterhouse, London.

In each of the places termed the Inner Temple, the Middle Temple, and Gray's Inn, the officer for the time being acting as the under-treasurer of such inn of court, and in the place termed Charterhouse, London, the registrar shall be the overseer of such place; and in default of any such officer, the justices having jurisdiction in such inns or place respectively shall appoint some inhabitant householder therein to be the overseer thereof for the then current year, and thenceforth from year to year so long as the office of under-treasurer or registrar shall be vacant; provided that such places shall not be liable to be added to any union or other district for the purposes aforesaid. — Extra-Parochial Places Act 1857

The 1857 act was not completely successful and several areas continued to operate extra-parochially. The Poor Law Amendment Act 1866 (29 & 30 Vict. c. 113) converted to civil parishes any place that levied a separate poor rate and the Poor Law Amendment Act 1868 (31 & 32 Vict. c. 122) incorporated "for all civil parochial purposes" the extra-parochial places remaining on 25 December 1868, that were without an appointed overseer of the poor, into a neighbouring parish with the longest common boundary.
