= APHS =

APHS may refer to:

- Abbey Park High School, Oakville, Ontario, Canada
- Aberfoyle Park High School, South Australia, Australia
- Academy Park High School, Sharon hill, Pennsylvania
- Alderman Peel High School, Norfolk, England
- Allen Park High School Allen Park, Michigan
- Andrada Polytechnic High School, Vail, Arizona
- Arthur Phillip High School, New South Wales, Australia
- Averill Park High School, Averill Park, New York
- Avon Park High School, Avon Park, Florida
