= Werter Road Baptist Church =

Grade II listed church in the United kingdom

Coordinates: 51.462558°N 0.215159°W

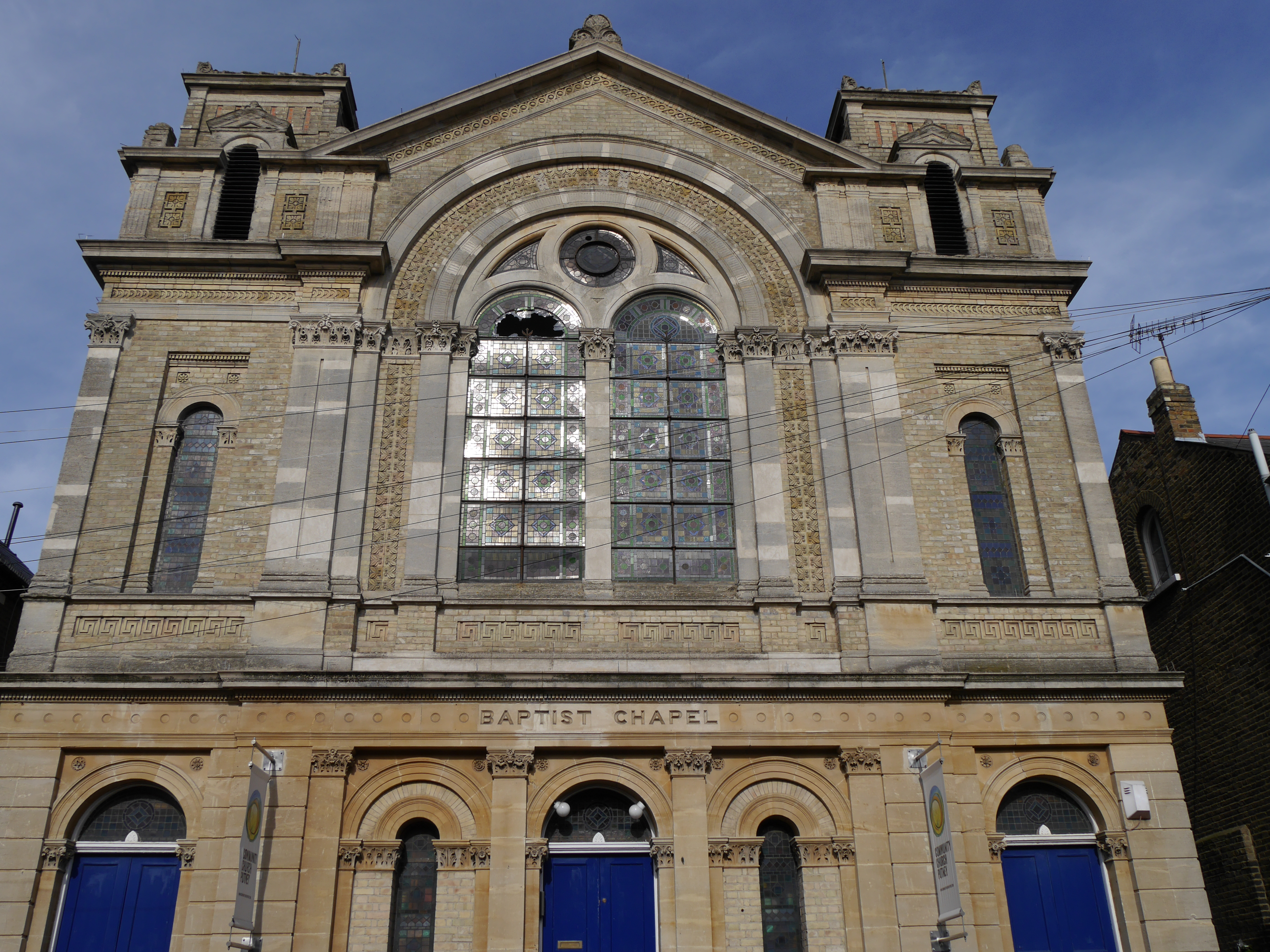
Werter Road Baptist Church

Werter Road Baptist Church is a Baptist Grade II listed church building in Putney, in the London Borough of Wandsworth.

== Location ==
The church is on Werter Road in Putney SW15, on the north side of the road, opposite Sainsbury's supermarket.

== Building ==
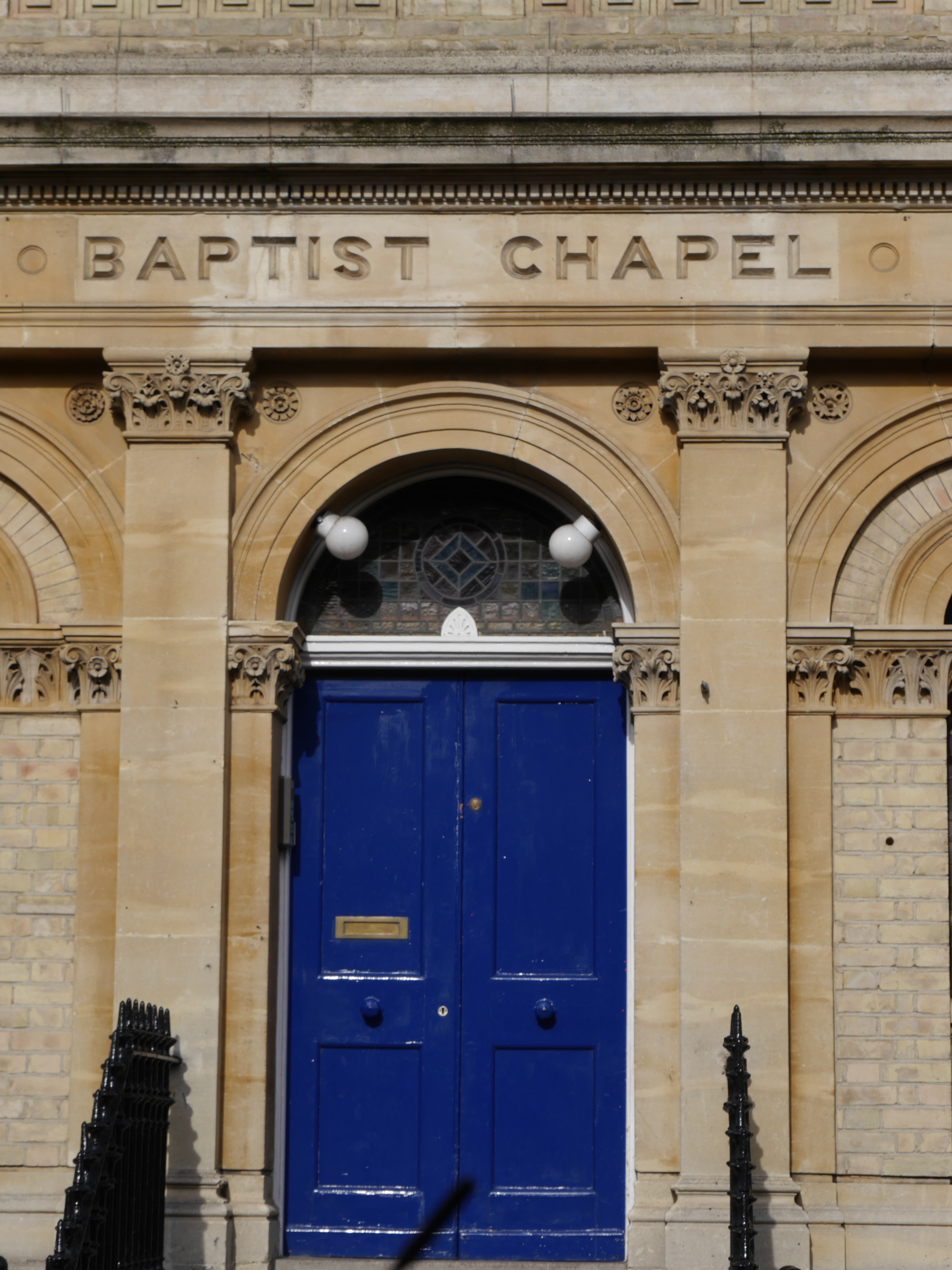
Original 'Baptist Chapel' words over entrance to Werter Road Baptist Church

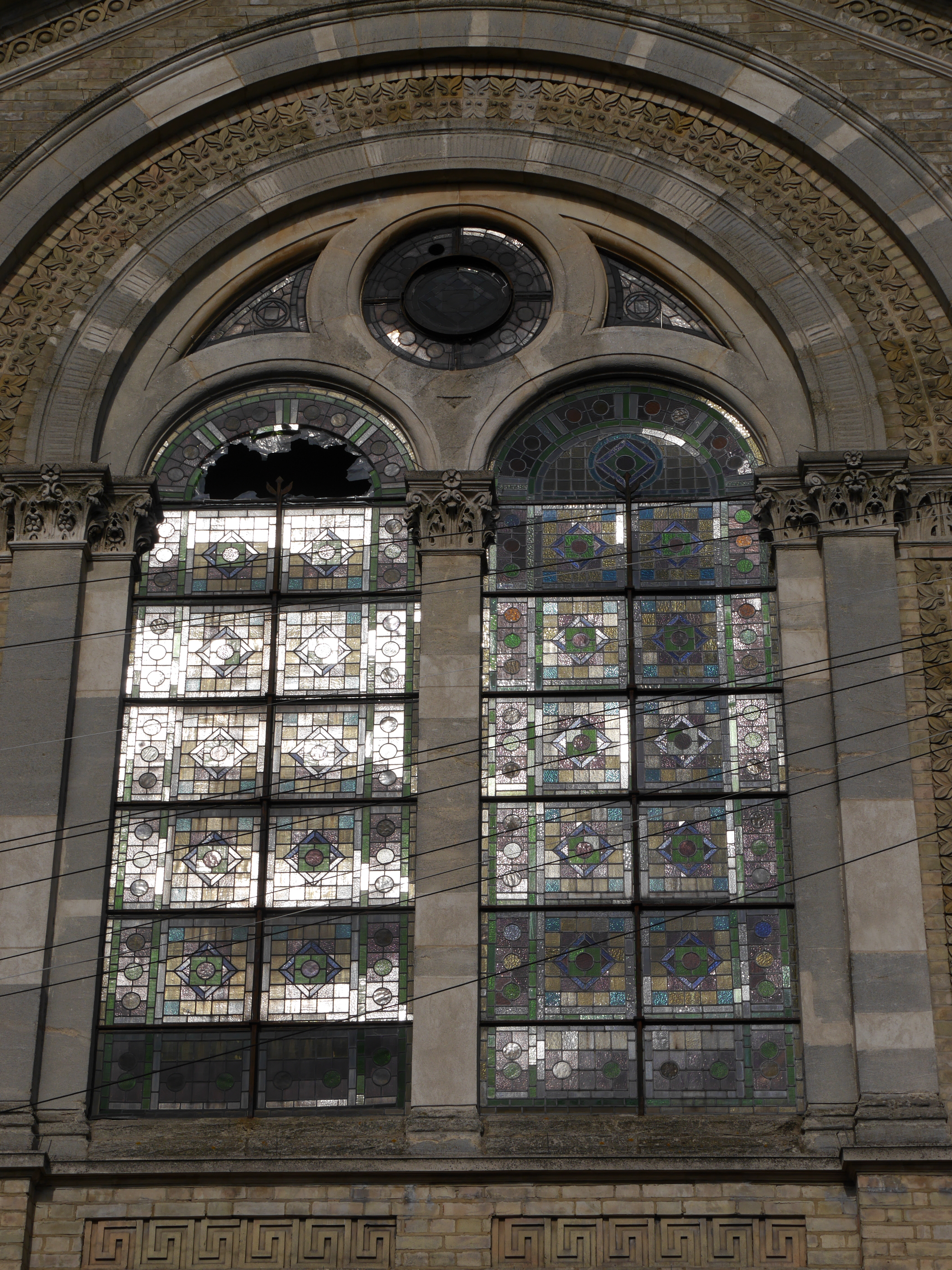
Tripartite articulated window over Werter Road Baptist Church

Plans were drawn up for the church in 1882 to 1883, costs were estimated to be £3200 and baptist pastor Charles Spurgeon was named as the treasurer in charge. The building was then built in 1884, the architect was John Johnson (1843 - 1920) and the total cost was £5200. The 'baptist chapel' opened on Sunday 4 January 1885, it is made of brick, has a chapel for 800 people and a baptistery, vestries and basement school room for 500.

The architecture is in Romanesque style with symmetrical structures in yellow brick. There are three sets of steps with iron railings leading inside, with round arches above the doors, framed with banded piers and entablature. There is a central two paned window with tripartite articulation. The building was Grade II listed on 7 April 1983.

The building was refurbished in 2015, in the process the church leaders found a letter from Charles Spurgeon dated 1876 when the church community was developing.

== Worship ==
As of 2022 the building is the 'Community Church Putney', part of the New Frontiers International Trust, and also associated with the Baptist Union and the Evangelical Alliance.
