= Wretton SSSI =

UK Site of Special Scientific Interest

Coordinates: 52.565°N 0.483°E

- Site of Special Scientific Interest
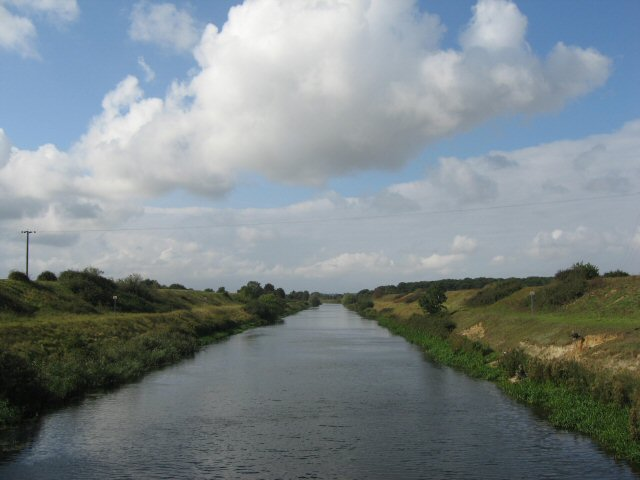
- Location of Wretton SSSI.
- Area of search: Norfolk, England
- Grid reference: TL 684 992
- Interest: Geological
- Area: 20.6 hectares (51 acres)
- Notification date: 1985
- Location map: Magic Map

Wretton SSSI is a 20.6-hectare (51-acre) geological Site of Special Scientific Interest north-east of Downham Market in Norfolk, England. It is a Geological Conservation Review site.

This site exposes layer across the transition between the warm Ipswichian and the colder Devensian around 115,000 years ago. It has the richest assemblage of early Devensian vertebrate fossils in Britain, including arctic fox, bison and woolly rhinoceros.

A footpath runs along the boundary of part of the site.
