= Eastern Multi-academy Trust =

- Founded: 6 August 2010
- Type: Multi-academy Trust
- Registration no.: 07338780
- Location: Trust Offices, Queen Mary Road, King's Lynn, Norfolk, England, PE30 4QG
- Website: www.e-mat.org.uk

Eastern Multi-academy Trust was formed by resolution 9 May 2017, when the College of West Anglia withdrew its membership from the CWA Academy Trust.

It is sponsor of schools with academy status based in Norfolk, England, founded by The College of West Anglia.

The trust was founded to help improve primary and secondary education in the area, around the college's ethos of 'changing lives through learning'.

== Academies ==
CWA Academy Trust in 2014 sponsored five academies in the Norfolk area, three of which are in King's Lynn and two of which are in Downham Market. These were King's Lynn Academy, founded in 2010, Downham Market Academy (2013), Eastgate Academy, Nelson Academy and King Edward VII Academy (2014).

=== Secondary schools ===
- King's Lynn Academy, King's Lynn
- Downham Market Academy, Downham Market
- King Edward VII Academy, King's Lynn

In 2017, King's Lynn Academy was judged by Ofsted to be inadequate, and Downham Market Academy instructed to leave this trust.

=== Primary schools ===
- Nelson Academy, Downham Market
- Eastgate Academy, King's Lynn

These were joined by

- Emneth,
- North Wootton,
- Southery
- Upwell academy.
