= Downham Market Town Hall =

Municipal building in Downham Market, Norfolk, England

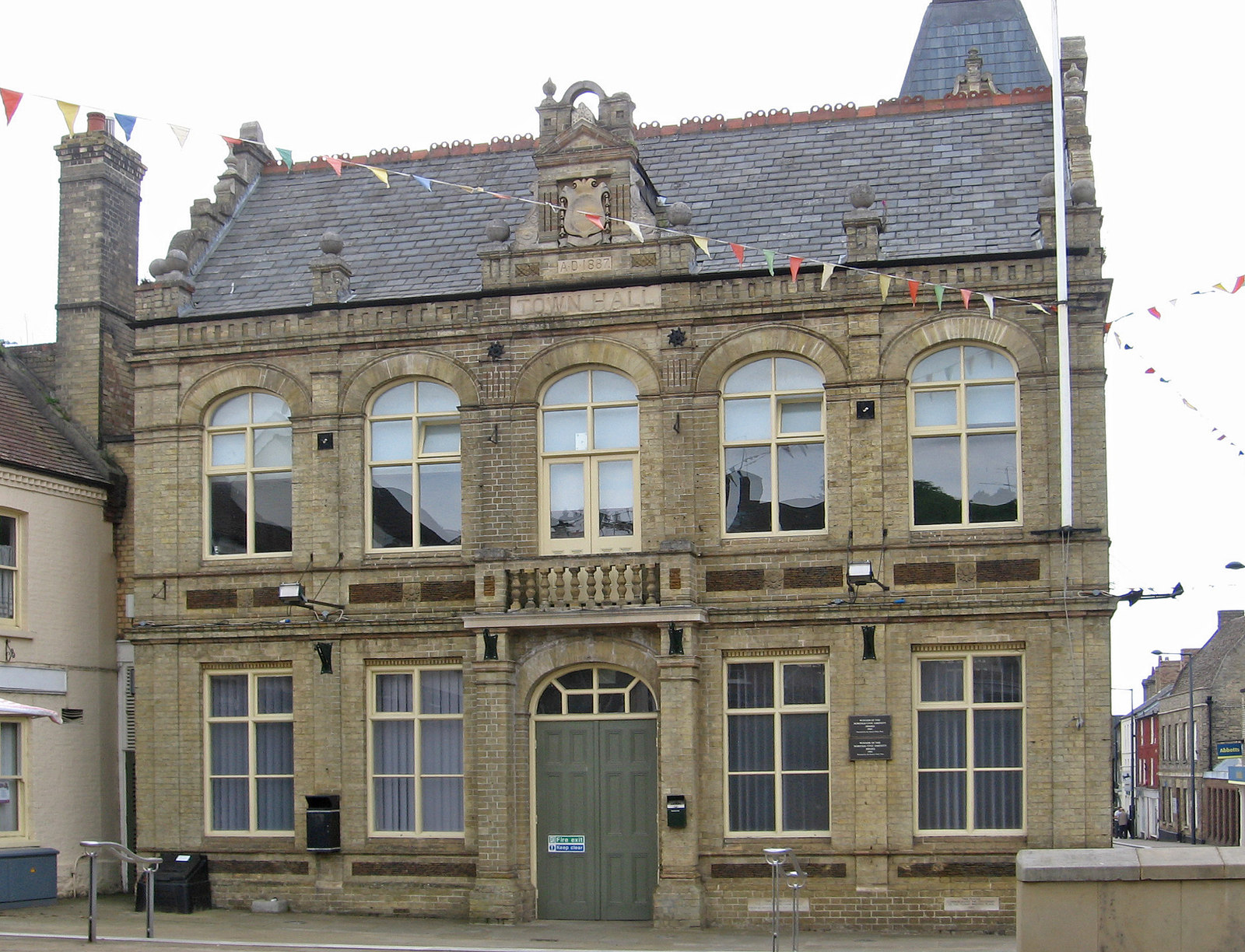
- Downham Market Town Hall

- Shown in Norfolk
- 52.6027°N 0.3771°E
- Location: Bridge Street, Downham Market

History
- Built: 1887

Site notes
- Architect: John Johnson
- Architectural style: Renaissance Revival style

Listed Building – Grade II
- Official name: Town Hall
- Designated: 16 November 1972
- Reference no.: 1342634

Downham Market Town Hall is a municipal building in Bridge Street, Downham Market, Norfolk, England. The structure, which is managed by Downham Market Town Council, is a Grade II listed building.

== History ==
Following their appointment in 1835, the first municipal building procured by the improvement commissioners in Downham Market was a courthouse on London Road in 1861. They then decided to commission a new civic building, which was financed by public subscription, to celebrate the Golden Jubilee of Queen Victoria; the site they selected was on the west side of the Market Square.

The new building was designed by John Johnson in the Renaissance Revival style, built by Bennett Brothers in yellow brick and brown carrstone at a cost of £1,730 and was officially opened by the member of parliament, William Tyssen-Amherst, on 20 October 1887. The design involved a symmetrical main frontage with five bays facing onto the Market Square; the central bay featured a doorway with a fanlight flanked by square Doric order columns supporting a cornice and a balustraded balcony. On the first floor, there was a central round-headed French door, while the other bays were fenestrated by square-headed windows on the ground floor and round-headed windows on the first floor. At roof level, there was a balustrade, a panel inscribed with the words "Town Hall" and a central gable containing a shield and a stone inscribed with the date of construction. On the north side of the building there was a short tower with a mansard roof and a weather vane. Internally, the principal rooms were an assembly hall, a corn exchange, a library and a reading room. The local literary institute, which had been established in 1865 following a gift by Edward Stanley, 15th Earl of Derby, occupied the library and reading room following completion of the town hall.

Improvement commissioners' districts were converted into urban districts in 1894, and so the building passed to the new Downham Market Urban District Council. The town hall continued to serve as the headquarters of the urban district council for much of the 20th century but ceased to be the local seat of government when the enlarged King's Lynn and West Norfolk District Council was formed in 1974.

Downham Market Town Council took over management of the building in 2008 and carried out a programme of refurbishment works, which included the installation of a lift, in 2013. The Downham Market Heritage Centre, which had been established as a local history museum on the first floor of the town hall in the early 21st century, rapidly outgrew its accommodation and relocated to the old fire station in Priory Road in March 2016.
