= Neil Shephard =

British economist

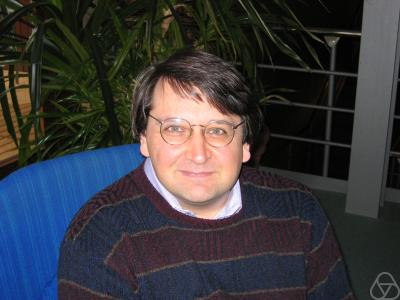
- Born: 8 October 1964 (age 61); Plymouth, England
- Education: University of York; London School of Economics
- Known for: auxiliary particle filter, realised variance, bipower variation
- Spouse: Dr Heather Bell
- Awards: Guy Medal in Silver, 2017; Richard Stone Prize, 2012
- Scientific career
- Fields: econometrics, statistics, finance
- Workplaces: London School of Economics; Nuffield College, Oxford; Harvard University
- Website: scholar.harvard.edu/shephard/home

Neil Shephard (born 8 October 1964), FBA, is an econometrician, currently Frank B. Baird Jr., Professor of Science in the Department of Economics and the Department of Statistics at Harvard University.

His most well known contributions are: (i) the formalisation of the econometrics of realised volatility, which nonparametrically estimates the volatility of asset prices, (ii) the introduction of the auxiliary particle filter (signal extraction), (iii) the nonparametric identification of jumps in financial economics, through multipower variation, (iv) stochastic volatility models based on non-Gaussian Ornstein-Uhlenbeck processes, known as 'Barndorff-Nielsen-Shephard' models.

== Early life and education ==
Neil Shephard was born in Plymouth, England, but moved to Norfolk, England, aged one. His mother was Tydfil Shephard (1930–1972), who was a high school teacher. His father was Tom Shephard (1930–2023), who was a Norfolk high school head. Since 1975, the former Conservative MP and government minister Gillian Shephard has been his step-mother. He attended the Marshland High School West Walton (a state comprehensive school), King Edward VII School in King's Lynn and City of Norwich School, where he studied pure mathematics & statistics, economics and politics at A-level. He studied economics and statistics as an undergraduate at the University of York in the UK (1983–86), and was awarded a first class degree with distinction. He did his M.Sc. (awarded in 1987, with distinction) and Ph.D. (examined in 1989 and graduated in 1990) at the LSE.

== Academic career ==
He was a lecturer in statistics at the LSE from 1988 to 1993. He moved to Nuffield College, Oxford in 1991 to join the economics group as the Gatsby Prize Research Fellow in Econometrics (funded by the Gatsby Foundation). In 1993 he became an Official Fellow in Economics at Nuffield College, Oxford. He has been Professor of Economics and of Statistics at Harvard University since 2013.

He was elected a Fellow of the British Academy in 2006, a Fellow of the Econometric Society in 2004. He was awarded an honorary doctorate in economics by Aarhus University in 2009, the 2012 Richard Stone Prize in Applied Econometrics and the 2017 Guy Medal in Silver of the Royal Statistical Society.

With David F. Hendry he founded the Econometrics Journal in 1998. With Colin Mayer he founded Oxford University's Masters in Financial Economics. In 2007 he co-founded the Oxford-Man Institute, which he directed from 2007 to 2011. He chaired the Statistics Department at Harvard from 2015 to 2022. With Computer Science and Statistical colleagues, he founded Harvard University's Masters in Data Science in 2018 and the Harvard Data Science Initiative.

== Publications ==
=== Representative articles ===
- Iavor Bojinov and Neil Shephard (2019) "Time Series Experiments and Causal Estimands: Exact Randomization Tests and Trading", Journal of the American Statistical Association, 114, 1665-1682.
- Luke Bornn, Neil Shephard and Reza Solgi (2019) "Moment conditions and Bayesian nonparametrics", Journal of Royal Statistical Society, 81, 5-43.
- Ole E. Barndorff-Nielsen, Peter Reinhard Hansen, Asger Lunde, Neil Shephard (2008), "Designing realised kernels to measure the ex-post variation of equity prices in the presence of noise", Econometrica. Vol. 76, pp. 1481–1536
- G. Fiorentini, Enrique Sentana and Neil Shephard (2004) Likelihood-based estimation of latent generalised ARCH structures, Econometrica, 2004, 72, 1481–1517.
- Ole E. Barndorff-Nielsen and Neil Shephard (2004) Econometric analysis of realised covariation: high frequency based covariance, regression and correlation in financial economics, Econometrica, 72, 885–925.
- Ole E. Barndorff-Nielsen and Neil Shephard (2004) Power and bipower variation with stochastic volatility and jumps (with discussion) Journal of Financial Econometrics, 2004, 2, 1–48.
- Ole E. Barndorff-Nielsen and Neil Shephard (2002) Econometric analysis of realised volatility and its use in estimating stochastic volatility models, Journal of the Royal Statistical Society, Series B, 63, 2002, 253–280.
- Ole E. Barndorff-Nielsen and Neil Shephard (2001) Non-Gaussian Ornstein-Uhlenbeck-based models and some of their uses in financial economics, (with discussion), Journal of the Royal Statistical Society, Series B, 63, 2001, 167–241.
- Michael K. Pitt and Neil Shephard (1999) Filtering via simulation: auxiliary particle filter, Journal of the American Statistical Association, 94, 1999, 590–599.
- Sangjoon Kim, Siddhartha Chib and Neil Shephard (1998) Stochastic volatility: likelihood inference and comparison with ARCH models, Review of Economic Studies, 65, 1998, 361–393.
- Andrew C. Harvey, Esther Ruiz and Neil Shephard (1994) Multivariate stochastic variance models, Review of Economic Studies 61, 1994, 247–264.

=== Edited volumes ===
- Neil Shephard (2005) Stochastic Volatility: Selected Readings, edited volume, Oxford University Press.
