= Dan Ashworth =

English football director (born 1971)

Sporting Director of Manchester United
- In office 1 July 2024 – 8 December 2024
- Leader: Dave Brailsford; Jean-Claude Blanc; David Gill; Michael Edelson; Alex Ferguson

Sporting Director of Newcastle United
- In office 7 February 2022 – 19 February 2024
- Leader: Yasir Al-Rumayyan; Amanda Staveley; Jamie Reuben
- Chairman: Yasir Al-Rumayyan
- Preceded by: Joe Kinnear (Director of Football)
- Succeeded by: Paul Mitchell

Personal details
- Born: Daniel Ashworth; 6 March 1971 (age 55)
- Occupation: Sporting Director; Footballer (1989–2000)

Daniel Ashworth (born 6 March 1971) is the Chief Football Officer for the FA. He was previously the sporting director for Premier League clubs Manchester United and Newcastle United. He also worked as technical director for West Bromwich Albion and Brighton & Hove Albion, and was FA director of elite development.

== Early life and career ==
Daniel Ashworth was born on 6 March 1971. He was raised in Norfolk and studied at the College of West Anglia from 1987 to 1989. After time in the academy at Norwich City, Ashworth joined non-league club Eastbourne Town playing 21 games and scoring four goals before moving across to St. Leonards. Ashworth later spent time in the United States, coaching West Florida Fury, before returning to England to play for Wisbech Town. Ashworth left Wisbech in the autumn of 2000, following financial problems at the club.

Ashworth continued to be involved with football after retiring as a player, and was appointed academy director at Peterborough United in 2000. In 2001, he went on to become centre of excellence director at Cambridge United until March 2004 when he moved to West Bromwich Albion assisting youth team manager Aidy Boothroyd. After Boothroyd's departure in the July of that year he took over as youth team manager until he was promoted to the club's sporting and technical director in December 2007.

On 17 September 2012, Ashworth was appointed as the FA director of elite development. He is one of the creators of the "England DNA", an elite player development plan which aims "to help create winning senior teams, in the men's and the women's game." In August 2018, it was reported that Ashworth had been shortlisted by Manchester United as a candidate for the technical director.

In September 2018, it was announced that Ashworth had resigned his role with the FA, and would take up the post of technical director at Premier League club Brighton & Hove Albion in spring 2019. In February 2022, it was confirmed that Ashworth had agreed to join Premier League club Newcastle United, taking up the post of sporting director.

On 19 February 2024, Newcastle confirmed that they had agreed a compensation package to enable his departure from the club to join Manchester United, and that he had begun a period of gardening leave. He officially joined Manchester United as sporting director on 1 July 2024. However, five months into the role, Ashworth left the club. His departure, confirmed by mutual agreement, came amid a period of transition and restructuring at the club. It was later revealed that it cost the club £4.1 million to terminate Ashworth's contract.

In May 2025 it was announced that Ashworth had been appointed as the FA's first Chief Football Officer.

== Personal life ==
His sons Finn and Zac are professional footballers.
