= Isle College, Wisbech =

Former college of further education in Wisbech, Cambridgeshire

The Isle College, Wisbech, Cambridgeshire, opened in 1956 as the Isle of Ely Further Education College and Horticultural Institute. In 1983, it became a tertiary education college. In 1987, its horticultural institute separated to become part of the Cambridgeshire College of Agriculture and Horticulture. In 2006, the Isle College was dissolved and merged with The College of West Anglia to become the expanded college's "Isle Campus".

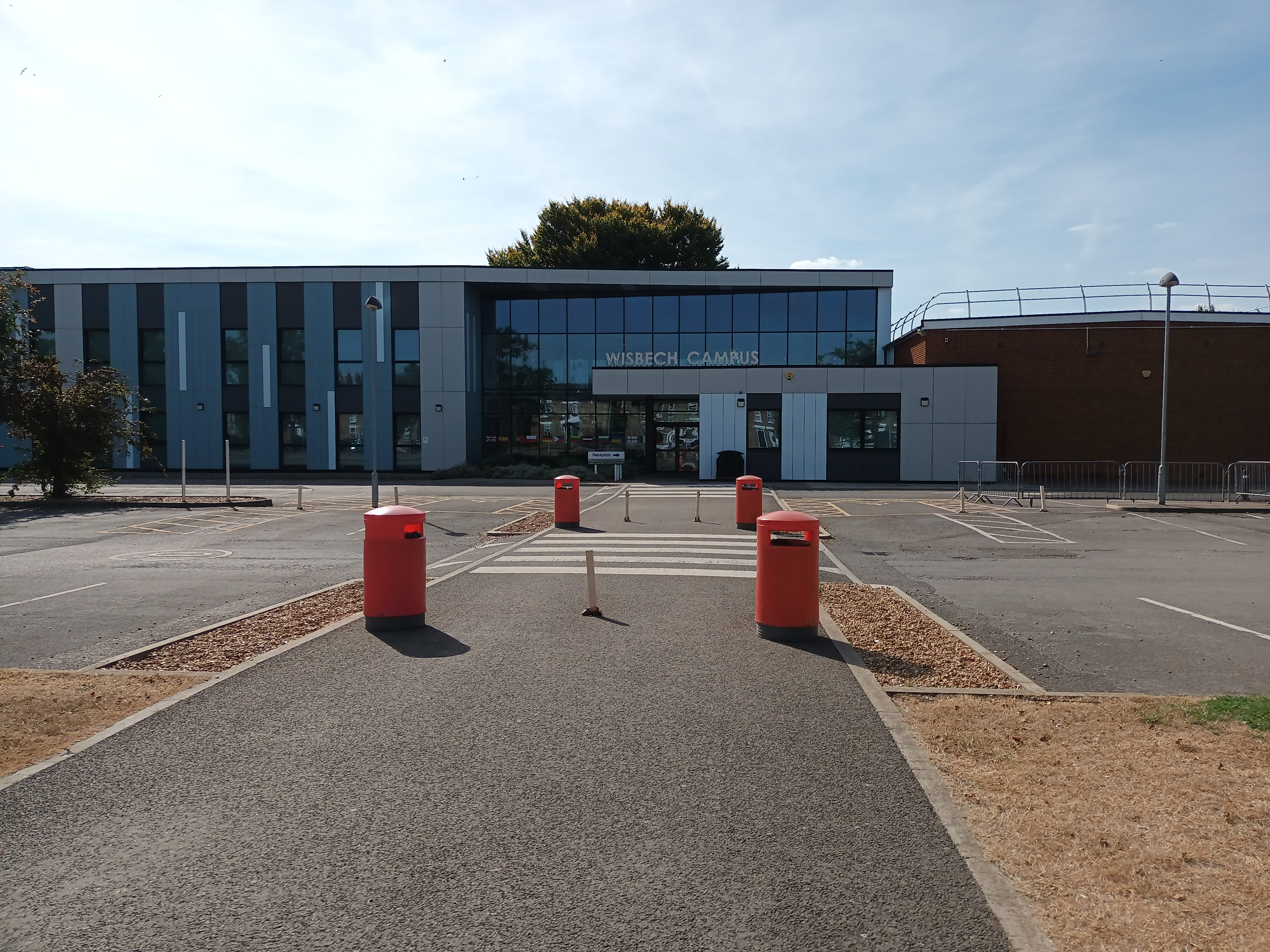
The main building of the Wisbech Campus of the University of West Anglia (formerly Isle College, Wisbech) taken in August 2022.

== History ==
The establishment of a further education college on the Isle of Ely had been the long-held ambition of Alderman J. W. Payne J.P., the Chairman of the Isle of Ely County Council Education Committee. In 1954, the County Council authorised the building of a new college for "the provision of further education for all the young people of this county, similar to that already enjoyed by adolescents in other areas." In 1955 Alderman Payne became the first chairman of the new college's governing body. The first students entered the college in 1956. The building incorporated what was said, at the time, to be "one of the finest concert halls in East Anglia." In the 1960s and 1970s, blues and rock bands including Alexis Korner, Tyrannosaurus Rex, the Jimi Hendrix Experience, Free, Atomic Rooster and The Edgar Broughton Band performed at the college.

According to its own promotional material, in the late 1980s the college offered 750 full time study places.

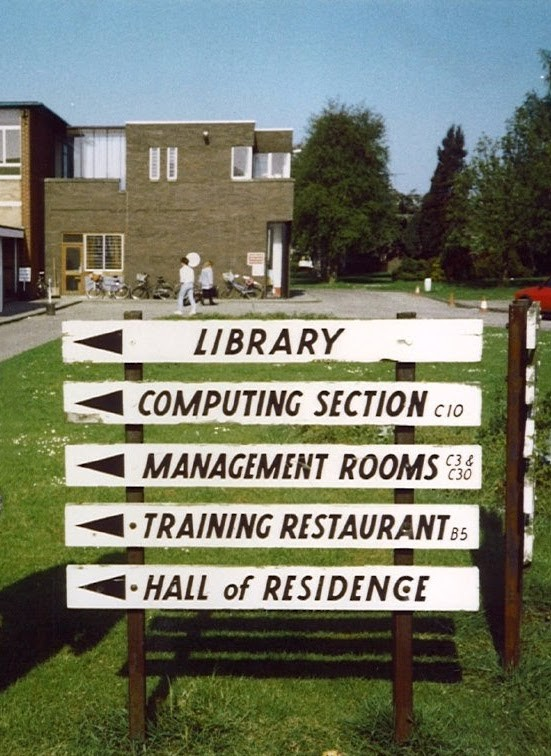
Signposts indicating various facilities provided by Isle College in 1988, located in front of the original main entrance.

In 1994, the Further Education Funding Council inspectorate wrote: "Its provision is mainly designed for school leavers. There is an extensive range of full-time courses in art and design, substantial provision in business studies and a broad range of GCE A level courses. The college has made limited progress in expanding the range of its provision to meet the requirements of adults, those in employment and those without formal entry qualifications." The college's main catchment was Fenland district, south Lincolnshire and west Norfolk. The main feeder schools were Queens School, Wisbech, and the three Cambridgeshire community colleges, Cromwell, Sir Harry Smith and Neale Wade.

== Dissolution and merger ==
On 1 April 2006, Isle College was dissolved and merged with the College of West Anglia, based in King's Lynn. The colleges voted to merge with the intention of attracting more capital investment, though there was speculation at the time that the Wisbech campus would be closed and a new campus developed in March.

In 2012, the remaining land-based part of the college provision was moved to College of West Anglia's campus in Milton, Cambridge. This was blamed by some on government cutbacks.

== College principals ==
The principals of Isle College have included:

- H. R. Bailey (from its foundation)
- Harry Jones (1978 to 1993)
- Mark Taylor (to 2006 and merger)

== Former students ==
Some former students of the college's land-based courses have become National Trust head gardeners, zookeepers and to work for government agencies, such as the Environment Agency and English Nature.
