= Keith Rudd =

English cricketer (1946–2025)

Personal information
- Full name: Raymond Keith Rudd
- Born: 8 May 1946; Terrington St Clement, Norfolk, England
- Died: 30 May 2025 (aged 79); King's Lynn, Norfolk, England
- Batting: Left-handed
- Bowling: Left-arm fast-medium

Domestic team information
- Years: Team
- 1973: Minor Counties North
- 1971–1984: Norfolk

Career statistics
Competition	List A
Matches	1
Runs scored	1
Batting average	1.00
100s/50s	–/–
Top score	1
Balls bowled	66
Wickets	1
Bowling average	46.00
5 wickets in innings	–
10 wickets in match	–
Best bowling	1/46
Catches/stumpings	–/–
- Source: Cricinfo, 9 July 2012

Raymond Keith Rudd (8 May 1946 – 30 May 2025) was an English cricketer. Rudd was a left-handed batsman who bowled left-arm fast-medium. He was born at Terrington St Clement, Norfolk.

Rudd made his debut for Norfolk against Cambridgeshire in the 1971 Minor Counties Championship. In 1973, Rudd was selected to play for Minor Counties North in the Benson & Hedges Cup, making a single List A appearance against Lancashire at Old Trafford. Lancashire won the toss and elected to bat, making 275/5 in their 55 overs, with Rudd taking the wicket of Harry Pilling, to finish with figures of 1/46. Minor Counties North were dismissed for 127 in their chase, with Rudd making a single run before he was dismissed by Peter Lever. He continued to play minor counties cricket for Norfolk until 1984, making forty Minor Counties Championship appearances, as well as making a single MCCA Knockout Trophy appearance in his final season against Bedfordshire.

As well as cricket, Rudd was a player and manager of non-league football team King's Lynn F.C. He died on 30 May 2025, at the age of 79.
