= Patrick Holman =

English cricketer (born 1945)

Patrick Walter Holman (born 26 March 1945) was an English cricketer. He was a right-handed batsman who played for Cambridgeshire. He was born in Downham Market.

Holman, who represented Cambridgeshire in the Minor Counties Championship between 1969 and 1978, made a single List A appearance for the team, during the 1975 season, against Northamptonshire. From the upper-middle order, he scored 4 runs.
