= King Edward VII Academy =

Location
- Gaywood Road; King's Lynn, Norfolk, PE30 2QB; England; 52°45′24″N 0°24′49″E

Information
- Type: Academy
- Motto: 'doctrina in horas crescat' (let the learning grow hourly)
- Local authority: Norfolk
- Trust: Inspiration Trust
- Department for Education URN: 148826 Tables
- Ofsted: Reports
- Principal: Darren Hollingsworth
- Staff: 278
- Gender: Coeducational
- Age: 11 to 18
- Enrolment: 1,189 pupils (2024)
- Houses: 4 (Gloucester/Windsor, Keene/Thorseby, Edinburgh/York, Lancaster/School)
- Colours: Navy and Burgundy
- Website: http://www.kesacademy.co.uk/

King Edward VII Academy (known as KES Academy) is a large, coeducational comprehensive secondary school in Gaywood Road (A148), King's Lynn, Norfolk, England with around 1,300 pupils, including about 300 in sixth form education. Prior to the school year beginning in September 1979, King Edward's school (KES) was an all-boys state grammar school.

The school became an academy sponsored by the College of West Anglia's CWA Academy Trust in September 2014 but, following the college's withdrawal from school sponsorship in the summer of 2017, it became part of the Eastern Multi-academy Trust. The school joined Inspiration Trust in September 2021.

== History ==
The history of the school dates to 1510, when former Lord Mayor of Lynn 'Thomas Thoresby' (who began in his lifetime Thoresby College for thirteen chantry priests), established a provision in his will for a priest to teach six children 'in grammar and song'.

In 1543 Thoresby's son of the same name agreed to grant four pieces of pasture in Gaywood referred to in his father's will to the corporation, on condition that it appointed a suitably qualified priest as schoolmaster to teach six children who would pray daily for his father's soul. The foundation's name was changed to King Edward VII Grammar School in 1903, when it was amalgamated with the King's Lynn Technical School.

The current academy building was designed by Basil Champneys and opened in 1906 by King Edward VII. In 2007 the school was visited by Queen Elizabeth II as part of the centenary celebrations of the building. King Edward VII Academy has a sister school in Chongqing, China.

The school became an academy on 1 September 2014, sponsored by the College of West Anglia's CWA Academy Trust, and changed its name to King Edward VII Academy.

In 2017 the new academy had a section 5 inspection from Ofsted. It was judged to require improvements, and an interim executive board (IEB) was appointed. In 2018 it had a monitoring visit. It failed to show the progress required and the inspectors reissued the 2017 recommendations. In 2019, King Edward VII Academy received an 'inadequate' report from Ofsted. Following the report, the school appointed its first female head teacher, Ms Sarah Hartshorn.

In 2021, King Edward VII Academy joined the Inspiration Trust, who opened a new Ofsted record for it. Ms Hartshorn was replaced as Principal in 2023 by Darren Hollingsworth.

== Description ==
This is a larger than average secondary school, with a sixth form. There are approximately 180 students in each year group. It is organised into houses for sports, and academically into these subject departments:

- Art, Design & Photography
- Business Studies
- Computer Science
- Design Technology
- English
- Food
- Geography
- History
- Mathematics
- Media Studies
- Modern Foreign Languages
- Music
- Psychology
- Physical Education
- Religious Education
- Sociology
- Science

Virtually all maintained schools and academies follow the National Curriculum, and are inspected by Ofsted on how well they succeed in delivering a 'broad and balanced curriculum'. it is recommended that Key Stage 3 contains years 7, 8 and 9. In Key Stage 4 and the students study subjects that will be examined by the GCSE exams at 16, this consists of a core of double English, Maths and Science, a choice of a humanity and a modern language which will be Spanish or French. The also will choose from a range of options which are directed towards their interests and needs. On top of this the school must provide instruction in Careers, British Values and RE.

At Key Stage 4, students were entered into 16 EBACC qualifying GCSEs, and 18 other GCSEs or equivalent qualifications. 44% of those students achieved an EBACC, which is with in a point of the Norfolk and national averages.

== Academic performance ==
After transitioning into an academy, with a new headteacher the school was visited by Ofsted for an initial Section 5 Inspection. They found a school had long standing problems. The principal, who had acted as an executive headteacher to support another local secondary school, returned full-time to King Edward VII Academy, alongside a number of other senior leaders in March 2017.

- The proportion of pupils who are eligible for the pupil premium funding is slightly below the national average.
- The proportion of pupils who have special educational needs and/or disabilities is broadly in line with the national average.
- Pupils often enter with attainment that is significantly lower than expected for their age. However, this is not a consistent picture for all year groups.

A new chief executive officer has supported the school moving from the CWA into the EMAT. Following the appointment of a new chief executive officer to the trust, the trust reorganised the leadership of secondary schools under its responsibility.

The school met the floor standards set by the Department for Education for the achievement of pupils in Year 11 in 2016. The school does not comply with Department for Education guidance on what academies should publish on their website, and does not meet requirements on the publication of information about pupil premium, Year 7 catch-up funding or ensuring that all policies refer to the correct academy trust.

The inspectors examined the result of 2016 Year 11s and said that the most able pupils in Year 11 had made progress that was broadly in line with the national average. Most notably, their achievement in the non-core subjects was significantly higher than pupils nationally. While the small number of most-able disadvantaged pupils made progress broadly in line with the national average in 2016, they did not attain as highly as their peers nationally. School information and inspection evidence indicates that current most-able pupils are making stronger progress, than their less able peers.

The progress made by those who have special educational needs and/or disabilities is inconsistent. Leaders have acknowledged the poor performance of these pupils in 2016, and have quickly implemented a series of actions to support them more effectively. This is having some impact in Year 11; but it is not consistent across all year groups and subjects, Disadvantaged pupils in Year 11 in 2016 did not make the progress of which they were capable. especially for those pupils with broadly typical attainment. The 'monitoring of pupils' progress and the targeting of the additional funding is not precise enough assess its exact impact, especially at key stage 3.

The sixth form is good. The courses offered are mainly A levels (a level 3 course), though arrangements are made for certain youngsters to do more practical courses at other trust operated sixth forms.

== Notable former pupils ==
The alumni association, the Old Lennensians, was revived in 2006 in association with the centenary of the new buildings donated by Sir William Lancaster.

Former pupils of the predecessor grammar schools, King Edward VII and the Lynn Grammar School, include: Captain George Vancouver; Captain Manby, whose rocket apparatus for ship-to-shore rescues was used by HM Coastguard until recently; the Rev Somerset Walpole (later a bishop), England cricketer and former Captain of Middlesex Peter Parfitt; field hockey coach Danny Kerry, Performance Director for UK & GB Men's & Women's Hockey at the 2012 Summer Olympics. Neil Shephard, FBA, is currently Frank B. Baird, Jr. Professor of Science in the Department of Economics and the Department of Statistics at Harvard University.

The 18th-century murderer Eugene Aram was an usher (teacher) at the school, and was arrested there in the staff room.

Michael Caine attended the school as a WW II evacuee. More recently, weather forecaster Lucy Verasamy was a pupil.

Former Formula One driver and TV commentator Martin Brundle was a pupil.

== See also ==
- Springwood High School, King's Lynn
- King's Lynn Academy
- St Clement's High School
