= King's Lynn Academy =

School in King's Lynn, Norfolk, England

Location
- Queen Mary Road, Gaywood; King's Lynn, Norfolk, PE30 4QG; England; 52°45′08″N 0°25′01″E

Information
- Type: Academy (English school)
- Established: 1969
- Local authority: Norfolk
- Trust: Eastern Multi-academy Trust (E-MAT)
- Department for Education URN: 136202 Tables
- Ofsted: Reports
- Principal: Alan Fletcher
- Gender: Coeducational
- Age: 11 to 16
- Enrolment: 782
- Capacity: 1100
- Former Name 1: The Park High School
- Former Name 2: Gaywood Park High School
- Website: http://www.kingslynnacademy.co.uk

King's Lynn Academy (formerly "the Park High School") is a 11–16 mixed secondary school in the West Norfolk town of King's Lynn, England. It is situated on Queen Mary Road in Gaywood; and is one of four schools serving the town and adjacent villages.

== History ==
The school opened in 1939, originally with separate schools for boys and girls. Until 1997 it was known as Gaywood Park High School when it became the Park High School. The school became an academy in 2017, sponsored by the CWA Academy Trust founded by the College of West Anglia in 2010, which was renamed the Eastern Multi-academy Trust (E-MAT).

== Ofsted ==
In 2013, the school received its highest GCSE results with 83% of pupils achieving five or more GCSEs at grades C or above and 45% of pupils achieving five good grades (A* – C) including English and Maths.

In 2016, Ofsted put the school in Special measures, and an Interim Executive Board appointed: the school joined E-MAT. The monitoring inspection in October 2018 determined that it was out of measures and the visit was changed to a Section 5 Inspection (Full Inspection). It was graded as needing improvement.

== Curriculum Entitlement ==
Under the intense scrutiny of the EMC, the school examined all its practices and evolved a new philosophy and from that built up a new spiral syllabus. Lesson presentation followed a standard format and pattern, and by 2018 had convinced Ofsted that the new structures were in place, though a couple of subjects needed extra help.

Virtually all maintained schools and academies follow the National Curriculum, and are inspected by Ofsted on how well they succeed in delivering a 'broad and balanced curriculum'. The school has to decide whether Key Stage 3 contains years 7, 8 and 9- or whether year 9 should be in Key Stage 4 and the students just study subjects that will be examined by the GCSE exams at 16. The IEC decided that a three year Key Stage 3 was appropriate for this community.

=== Key Stage 3 ===
In Years 7, 8, and 9 almost all pupils are expected to study the core academic subjects for all five years. They are supported by low-stakes formative testing.

=== Key Stage 4 ===
The two year academic curriculum in Key Stage 4 is deliberate. It is what the government normally recommends. The majority of pupils study for the full English Baccalaureate suite of subjects. Option choices allow for all pupils to add other subjects from the realms of the arts, technical and physical subjects to this academic core. Planning ensures that it constantly builds on previous learning, with retention and unsupported recall prioritised for all students, including those who are gifted, disadvantaged or have additional needs. The success of the curriculum is monitored by the Academy Council and reported to parents on-line.

== See also ==
- Springwood High School, King's Lynn
- King Edward VII Academy
- St Clement's High School
