= Weybridge Priory =

Augustinian priory in England

Coordinates: 52.6475°N 1.5684°E

Weybridge Priory was an Augustinian priory in Acle, Norfolk, England, that was founded in the early 12th century, at some distance from the centre of the village, but next to an important ford over the River Bure. It was dissolved at the dissolution of the monasteries, and its stones were removed for local secular buildings to such an extent that the site of the priory is sometimes mistaken.
