= Sheringham Woodfields School =

Location
- Holt Road; Sheringham; Norfolk, NR26 8ND; England
- Coordinates: 52°56′05″N 1°11′55″E

Information
- Type: Foundation special school
- Local authority: Norfolk County Council
- Trust: Trust Norfolk-SEN
- Department for Education URN: 121258 Tables
- Ofsted: Reports
- Head teacher: Annette Maconochie
- Deputy Head Teacher: Michael Smith
- Gender: Co-educational
- Age range: 3 to 19
- Website: sheringhamwoodfields.co.uk
- Last updated: 6 January 2023

Sheringham Woodfields School is a co-educational special school located in Sheringham in the English county of Norfolk.

It is a Learning and Cognition Specialist School and has provision for 145 pupils aged 3–19 years with a diverse range of special educational needs who work at different levels of intellectual ability. All pupils at the school have a Statement of Special Educational Needs. The school staff and pupils also operate the Woodfield Den shop in Sheringham. The school has close links with the Holt Hall study centre, where Key Stage 4 pupils spend half a day per week for at least a half-term engaged in environmental work.

In March 2011 the school submitted an education bill asking for Emergency Life Support skills, already taught to pupils at the school, to be added to the National Curriculum.

In the beginning of January 2023 the school got a new headteacher, changing from Mr James Stanbrook to Miss Annette Maconochie according to the GOV.UK get information about schools service and the schools own website itself.
