= Nowhere, Norfolk =

Settlement in Norfolk, England, UK

Coordinates: 52.61365°N 1.64417°E

According to 19th-century directories, Nowhere or No-Where is a marshy area by the River Bure where the villagers of Acle, Norfolk had salt-pans to produce salt for food preservation, etc. In 1861 there were four inhabited houses and 16 people.

Originally an extra-parochial liberty, it was formally incorporated into Acle parish in 1862 and the name no longer appears in maps and gazetteers.
