= Gaywood, Norfolk =

Coordinates: 52.756°N 0.422°E

Gaywood
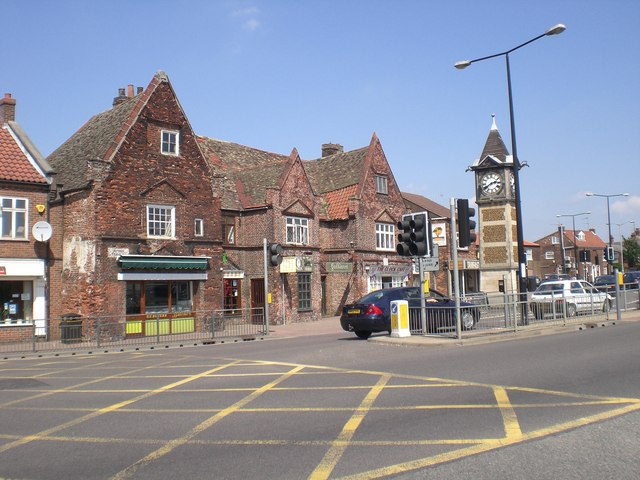
- The Grade II listed 16th-century shops of Bishop's Terrace face Gaywood's unusual clocktower war memorial

- Location within Norfolk
- District: King's Lynn and West Norfolk
- Shire county: Norfolk
- Region: East
- Country: England
- Sovereign state: United Kingdom
- Post town: KING'S LYNN
- Postcode district: PE30
- Dialling code: 01553
- UK Parliament: North West Norfolk

Gaywood is an eastern suburb of King's Lynn, in the King's Lynn and West Norfolk district of Norfolk, England.

Previously a civil parish in Freebridge Lynn Rural District, Gaywood became part of the borough of King's Lynn in 1935.

Gaywood Hall, the seat of the Bagge baronets in the late nineteenth and early twentieth centuries, was built on the site of a mediaeval palace of a Bishop of Norwich, John de Gray. The house later became part of King's Lynn Technical College.

The church of St Faith is in the Early English style, restored by Walter Caroe in the 1920s; the church is now shared by a partnership of Anglican and Methodist congregations.

According to William White's History, Gazetteer and Directory of Norfolk (1883), Gaywood was in the late 19th century a "considerable village" with a population of 805. The population expanded significantly in the 1960s after King's Lynn became an overflow town for London in 1962 and housing estates were built here and nearby in North and South Wootton. Gaywood is now a suburb of King's Lynn.

There are several schools in the Gaywood area; these include Gaywood Primary School, St Martha's Catholic Primary School, King's Oak Academy (formerly Howard Infant and Nursery School), Howard Junior School, King Edward VII School and King's Lynn Academy (formerly Gaywood Park High School).

The Gaywood area has a wide variety of local shops, including a Tesco supermarket, Aldi store, a launderette, several cafes and various takeaways.

The Gaywood Church Rooms are used as a meeting place for many different groups, including Gaywood Babies and Toddlers Group. It also used to be the home of the Gaywood Methodist Playgroup (established in 1968), but this closed for the final time in July 2016, due to a lack of children attending and ever increasing costs.

The Gaywood Park is a large open area of land which is used for activities such as football, cricket and dog-walking, as well as a weekly Sunday Market and car boot sale. It is also the site of the Gaywood Community Centre, the Gaywood Park Bowls club and the Gayton Road Cemetery.

== History ==
A series of archaeological test pits were dug between 2010 and 2013. The report was published in 2018.

== New Projects ==
The Borough Council of King's Lynn and West Norfolk have been given planning permission to build 380 new homes, which will include a mixture of one-bedroom apartments to four-bedroom houses. This initiative is part of a larger project titled the Active and Clean Connectivity Project.

== Civil parish ==
In 1931 the parish had a population of 1966. On 1 April 1935 the parish was abolished and merged with Kings Lynn.
