= Downham Market Academy =

Location
- Bexwell Road; Downham Market, Norfolk, PE38 9LL; England
- 52°36′14″N 0°23′19″E

Information
- Type: Academy
- Established: 1956
- Trust: CET (Cambridgeshire Educational Trust)) 2020
- Department for Education URN: 139204 Tables
- Ofsted: Reports
- Principal: Natalie Paine
- Staff: 250
- Gender: Coeducational
- Age: 11 to 16 Downham Market Academy; 16–18 Downham Market Academy Sixth Form
- Enrolment: 1420 pupils
- Houses: Keystage 3 (Years 7-9): X Band; Y Band; D Band; M Band; Keystage 4 (Years 10-11): X Band; Y Band
- Website: http://www.downhammarketacademy.co.uk

Downham Market Academy (formerly Downham Market High School) is a coeducational secondary school and sixth form with academy status, situated in Downham Market, Norfolk, England. The academy was launched on 1 July 2013, sponsored by the CWA Academy Trust founded by the College of West Anglia. Downham Market Academy is currently rated "Good" across all categories, based on the 2022 Ofsted inspection.

Teaching is shared between two sites, with the main Bexwell campus housing pupils years 7–11 (ages 11–16) and the Downham Market Academy Sixth Form (formerly Downham Market College) campus offering A-levels to sixth form pupils years 12–13 (ages 16–18). Downham market academy sixth form (Now known as Athena six form) is officially part of the school and attached to the building.

== History ==
The Bexwell site dates back to 1956 and was originally organised as separate boys' and girls' secondary modern single-sex schools. With building adaptations at the time of re-organisation in 1980, these former schools are now designated the Junior and Senior sides of the Bexwell site. The Upwell block was added as a consequence of the closure of Upwell Secondary in 1982 when around 220 additional pupils were added to the school roll. The Malcolm Arnold Room was opened by the composer Sir Malcolm Arnold in 1984. Other buildings on the Bexwell site include the Technology Block (1997), the Arts Block, housing History, Music and Drama (2001) and the English Block (2005).

Ryston was formerly the premises of Downham Grammar School, built in 1930 in the extensive grounds of the White House dating back to the 17th century. The house was formerly occupied by the headmaster of the school and, later, by the sixth form. It became surplus to requirements and was sold back into the residential sector in 2000. Since reorganisation, two new blocks have been added on the Ryston site. The Art and Business centre was opened by Gillian Shepherd MP, Minister of State for Education.

The academic years 1980/81 and 1981/82 saw the phasing out of the previous grammar and secondary modern pattern of education and, from September 1982, Downham Market High School became a fully amalgamated county, co-educational, secondary, comprehensive, day school. Year 7 pupils were based at Ryston after reorganisation in 1980, due to Bexwell insufficient space for five year groups, and Ryston's additional space for the then much smaller sixth form. Ofsted stressed the importance of uniting Key Stages 3 and 4 on the same site and this was duly achieved with the opening of the New Block on the Bexwell site in 2001. In September 1983, the existing transfer arrangements into the school were re-organised so that all pupils entered at 11+ and not, as hitherto, with pupils from the surrounding village primary schools entering at 11+ and pupils from Clackclose County Middle School and Hillcrest First and Middle School entering at 12+.

The school gained Grant-Maintained status in 1992 (which lasted until the change of Government in 1997) and was extended with new buildings, sports hall and swimming pool. Technology College status was gained in 1996 by the Specialist Schools and Academies Trust. The school became an academy in July 2013, sponsored by the College of West Anglia's CWA Academy Trust.

== Drama and music ==
The drama department is active in the academy, offering a range of extracurricular activities and producing a variety of productions each year. Sixth Sense Theatre Company is part of the drama department in the academy and teaches senior pupils the art of touring a production. Every summer the company tours a production; in recent years they have performed in Scotland, the Channel Islands and Australia.

The music department runs several orchestras and arranges instrument tuition for pupils. The department stages a number of concerts throughout the year including the annual Christmas and recital concerts.

=== Leavers videos ===
In July 2015, the Academy became notable for a viral video produced for the departing Year 11 students, which featured many of the current staff members lip-syncing to Queen's "Don't Stop Me Now". The video quickly gained attention, reaching 14,000 views in two weeks. It was directed by current Media Studies teacher Ian Gooda and ex-students Sam Lance and Lois Nash. A sequel was released in July 2016, featuring Bonnie Tyler's "Holding Out For A Hero". A third video was released in 2017, this time parodying the American television show Friends, and its theme tune "I'll Be There for You". It was again produced by Ian Gooda, Sam Lance, Lois Nash and Jamie Robinson. The videos continued to be produced annually until the final effort in 2019.

== Notable former pupils ==
=== Downham Market Grammar School ===
- Richard Carpenter, screenwriter
- Sue Welfare, writer

=== Downham Market High School ===
- Victoria Bush, English actress and comedian
- David Nurse, former English professional footballer
- Jacob Murphy, English professional footballer
- Josh Murphy, English professional footballer
- Shaun Pearson, former English professional footballer
- Chrissie Wellington OBE, English former professional triathlete and four-time Ironman Triathlon World Champion
