= St. Clement Elementary/Junior High School =

St. Clement Catholic Elementary/Junior High School

Location
- 7620 Mill Woods Road South; Edmonton, Alberta, T6K 2P7; Canada; 53°26′46″N 113°26′58″W

Information
- School type: Elementary/Junior High
- Motto: "Being the Best We Can Be"
- Religious affiliation: Roman Catholic
- Founded: 1977
- School board: Edmonton Catholic School District
- Superintendent: Joan Carr
- Area trustee: Kara Pelech
- Administrator: Joanne Ronaldson
- Principal: Lilliana Kucy
- Grades: K-9
- Enrollment: 500
- Language: English French offered
- Colours: Red,black,white
- Mascot: Chargers
- Team name: St. Clement Chargers
- Website: www.ecsd.net/8231

St. Clement Catholic Elementary/Junior High School is a Kindergarten to Gr.9 school in the Edmonton Catholic School District serving the Knottwood and Millhurst communities, bounded by 91st Street and 66th Street from 23rd Avenue south to the city limits of approximately 9th Avenue including Summerside and Ellerslie Crossing.

Transportation services by bus are available. Bus services provided by Edmonton Transit from the Lakewood and Town Centre terminals make the school very accessible.

== Extracurricular activities ==
Junior High Inter-school Athletics, Spirit Days, Family BBQ / Curriculum Evening, Cross Country Run, Journal Indoor Games, talent show.

== Programs ==
- International Baccalaureate (IB) Program - Kindergarten to Gr. 9
- Study Buddies
- K-9 Literacy Focus
- Fine arts program
- Recognitions for student academic excellence, effort and citizenship throughout the year.
- Extended physical education and a variety of complementary course offerings in Fine Arts and Career and Technology Studies provide junior high students with interesting learning opportunities.
- Year End Awards Evening celebrates student achievement in academics, sport, effort, citizenship
- Field trip program
