= Alderman Peel High School =

School in Wells-next-the-Sea, Norfolk, England

Location
- Market Lane; Wells-next-the-Sea, North Norfolk, NR23 1RB; England; 52°56′58″N 0°51′06″E

Information
- Type: Academy secondary school
- Founder: Alderman Sam Peel
- Local authority: Norfolk
- Trust: Wensum Trust
- Department for Education URN: 145089 Tables
- Ofsted: Reports
- Headteacher: Matt Hardman
- Gender: Mixed
- Age: 11 to 16
- Enrolment: 501
- Houses: Mersey, Trent, Waveney and Shannon
- Colours: Blue, purple, orange, green
- Website: http://www.aldermanpeel.norfolk.sch.uk/

Alderman Peel High School is an academy secondary school in Wells-next-the-Sea, Norfolk, England.

== History ==
=== The founder ===
Sam Peel, who was born in Wymondham, was not a Birthright Quaker, but by Conviction who had started off as a Methodist. He was permissive and tolerant. His faith and life of service started on him seeing the extreme poverty of the seafolk in Wells during a visit in 1909, which he attributed to alcohol and the public houses being the only social meeting places. He campaigned against drink and extended the Meeting House.

He constructed the first council houses in Wells-next-the-Sea, during World War I using the powers in the Housing of the Working Classes Act 1900. He was chair of the Norfolk Education Committee from 1943 until 1968. He steered through the Education Act 1944.

=== The secondary modern school ===
The school was founded in 1963 by Alderman Sam Peel, chair of the Norfolk Education Committee, as a secondary modern school.

The school became part of the Wensum Trust multi-academy trust in 2017. The trust includes Acle Academy, Hellesdon High School and seven primary schools.

== Inspection judgements ==
- In 2009 Ofsted judged the school as Outstanding.
- In 2012 Ofsted judged the school as Good.

== Headteachers ==
- 2005–2010: John Platten
- 2010–2022: Alastair Ogle
- 2022--present : matt Hardman

== Academic results ==
In 2017 GCSE results were below average for the Progress 8 benchmark and the linked Attainment 8 measure.

== Wells-Next-The-Sea Primary and Nursery School ==
The nearby primary school was in a 'hard federation' with the secondary school until both converted to an academy in 2017. The primary school had received a warning notice in 2016 because of its poor exam results.
