= Acle =

Town in Norfolk, England

Coordinates: 52.638°N 1.555°E

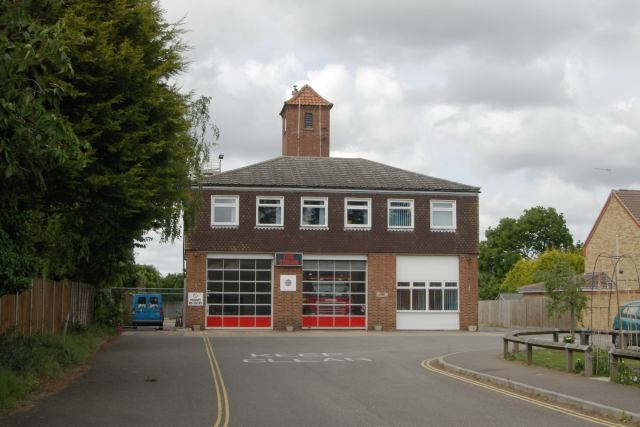
- Acle Fire Station

- Location within Norfolk
- Area: 9.46 km^{2} (3.65 sq mi)
- Population: 2,265 (2021)
  - Density: 239/km^{2} (620/sq mi)
- OS grid reference: TG4010
- Civil parish: Acle
- District: Broadland
- Shire county: Norfolk
- Region: East
- Country: England
- Sovereign state: United Kingdom
- Post town: NORWICH
- Postcode district: NR13
- Dialling code: 01493
- Police: Norfolk
- Fire: Norfolk
- Ambulance: East of England
- UK Parliament: Broadland and Fakenham

Acle (/ˈeɪkəl/ AY-kəl) is a market town on the River Bure on the Norfolk Broads in Norfolk, located halfway between Norwich and Great Yarmouth. It has the only bridge across the River Bure between Wroxham and Great Yarmouth.

The civil parish has an area of 9.46 km^{2} (3.65 sq mi) and in 2001 had a population of 2,732 in 1,214 households, increasing to a population of 2,824 in 1,285 households at the Census 2011. For the purposes of local government, the parish falls within the area of the district of Broadland.

== Etymology ==
The name "Acle" means "oaks lea", that is, a clearing in an oak forest. In Tudor times, hundreds of oaks were felled here for timber to construct Elizabeth I's warships.

== History ==
In Roman times, Acle was a port at the head of a large estuary named Gariensis. Acle is mentioned in the Domesday Book, and in 1253 it was granted a market charter. The livestock and local farmers' market existed until into the 1970s, as did a nearby auction site; the latter is now a new housing estate and the former is part-occupied by a branch of CO-OP, with the other part remaining a market, although essentially for tourist purposes: no livestock is now bought or sold there.

In 1382, Acle received the right for a "turbary", that is, the right to dig peat. Acle still has a boatyard and Boat Dyke and walks along the Bure to Upton and beyond are possible.

The Acle Straight is a turnpike road connecting Acle to Great Yarmouth. It opened in 1831. Acle railway station, which was built in 1883, lies on the Wherry Line from Norwich to Great Yarmouth. In 1892 a foundry was constructed that specialised in building windpumps for land drainage, including the last windpump built for the Broads, at Ash Tree Farm. The three-mile (5 km) £7.1m dual-carriageway A47 bypass opened in March 1989; local campaigners are still pressing for the dualling of the Acle Straight, the portion of the A47 running from Acle to Great Yarmouth, which has a relatively high accident rate.

Since the turn of the century, a walkway running from the station to the Boat Dyke has been constructed by local volunteers; this walk (known as Damgate) offers an opportunity to view indigenous flora, some of which are rare. Also on the Damgate walk, there have been repeated sightings of a kingfisher, locally known as Henry, which is said to fly under the abandoned railway bridge around mid afternoon.

Between 2009 - 2014 a series of archaeological test pits were dug in the village. The report was published in 2017

There is a high school (Acle Academy) in the town.

== Parish church of St Edmund ==
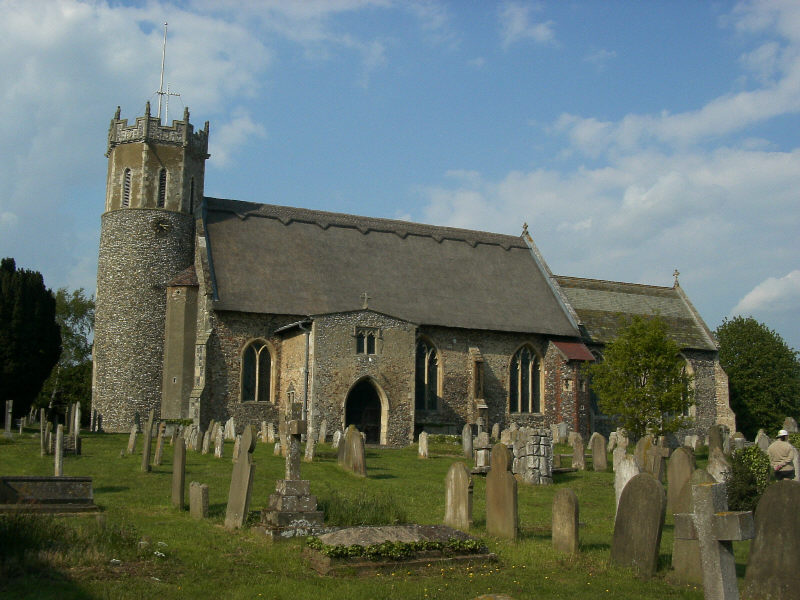
St Edmund's Church, Acle

The church of St Edmund is one of 124 existing round-tower churches in Norfolk. The round stage of the tower is the oldest part of the church, thought to be Saxon in origin and of a date between 850 and 950 AD. The octagonal stage was added in the 13th century, probably when the roof was raised. The battlements are from 1472. The tower houses six bells, five of which were cast in Norwich and date from 1623. The tower is reinforced with a metal frame to enable the bells to be rung safely. Entry to the church is by a porch on the north side, built in 1495. The dressed flints are in contrast with most of the walls which appear to be made of rubble.

The main body of the church, the nave, is thought on the evidence of the measurements and wall thickness to be Norman in origin. This is not immediately obvious as no Norman doorways or arches remain. In 1927, when ivy was being stripped from the outside walls, one of the buttresses collapsed revealing a find of Norman-worked stones, which were later reassembled for safekeeping in the roof stair space. It is probable that all the Norman doors and archways were demolished when the floor level was raised, perhaps to prevent flooding, in the 13th century. It is reasonable to assume that at least the foundations of the nave are Norman.

The main nave windows are 14th-century, and one near the pulpit is Tudor. The walls were probably painted at one time – a very small fragment of a dragon or a serpent-like creature still exists on the wall of the old rood staircase. The stone font in the nave is dated 1410.

A 15th-century wooden screen separates the nave from the chancel. It was not made for Acle church, and may have been brought from St Benet's Abbey or the Augustinian priory at Weybridge. The 14th-century chancel probably replaced an apse; the windows are of 14th-century design apart from the east window which holds Victorian stained glass.

== See also ==
- Nowhere
