= Smithdon High School =

Smithdon, High School

- The school building in 2023

Location
- Downs Road; Hunstanton, Norfolk, PE36 5HY; England; 52°56′11″N 0°29′49″E

Information
- Type: Academy
- Motto: Work Hard, Be Kind and Smile
- Established: 1955
- Trust: West Norfolk Academies Trust
- Department for Education URN: 143520 Tables
- Ofsted: Reports
- Headteacher: A. Gibbins
- Staff: 100+
- Gender: Coeducational
- Age: 11 to 16
- Enrolment: 559
- Capacity: 900
- Houses: 4
- Colours: Green, yellow, red, blue
- Website: smithdonhigh.org.uk

Smithdon High School (formerly known as Hunstanton Secondary Modern School and Hunstanton School) is a small comprehensive school (ages 11–16) academy, with 559 students in Hunstanton, Norfolk, England. Its buildings are Grade II* listed. It changed its status, joining the West Norfolk Academies Trust in 2016. Ofsted rated the school as 'Good' in 2023.

The Grade II* listed buildings were designed by Peter and Alison Smithson. They were completed in 1954, in the modernist style. They have remained largely unchanged though some of the featured clear glass panels were replaced by black panels to overcome a solar overheating problem. They were listed in 1993.

== School history ==
The school was opened in 1954. It was a product of extreme austerity, intended to educate the boys and girls aged 11 to 15 who had failed the 11-plus. The school became non-selective following the 1965 Circular 10/65 and in 1972 the school leaving age was raised to 16. The school had a wide catchment area, which includes many small, rural villages receiving students at 11 (year 7) from primary schools and 13 (year 9) from middle schools in the Norfolk three-tier system. This reverted to two tier. After a Good Ofsted Report in 2014, the school changed its status to an academy, within the West Norfolk Academies Trust Group. In 2023, Smithdon High School again received a 'Good' report from Ofsted.

== Ofsted report ==
Ofsted in 2023 reported 'Pupils value the opportunities to nurture existing talents and develop new ones. This goes beyond the traditional offer of sport. Many pupils, including those with special educational needs and/or disabilities (SEND), take advantage of these opportunities. High numbers of pupils participate in the Duke of Edinburgh's Award, pushing themselves commendably beyond their comfort zones. Pupils make positive contributions to the community and achieve personal success.'.

== Curriculum ==
Virtually all maintained schools and academies follow the National Curriculum, and are inspected by Ofsted on how well they succeed in delivering a 'broad and balanced curriculum'. Ofsted pointed out that the

'Since the previous inspection, the school has focused on improving the curriculum. Subject specialists have used the national curriculum as a starting point. Working with the trust they have identified the key knowledge that pupils need to know and by when. This has resulted in a series of well-crafted, ambitious programmes of study. Teachers support pupils to use what they already know to help them learn new content'

In 2025, Key Stage 3 and 4 students studied:

Subject	Key Stage 3 (age 11–13) Yr 7 8	Key Stage 4 (age 13–16) Yr 9 10 11
English	8	8
Mathematics	8	7
Science	6	9
Religious Education	2	
Physical Education	4	2
Geography	4	
History	4	
Modern Languages (German and French)	4	
Art & Design	2	
Music	2	
Drama	2	
Rotation (including Food and Nutrition, Resistant Materials and ICT)	4	
Subject Choice 1		6
Subject Choice 2		6
Subject Choice 3		6
Subject Choice 4		6
#Subject Choice|Total	50	50

Potential Key Stage 5 students are offered places in the sixth form at Springwood High School in Lynn.

== Buildings ==
=== Architectural history ===
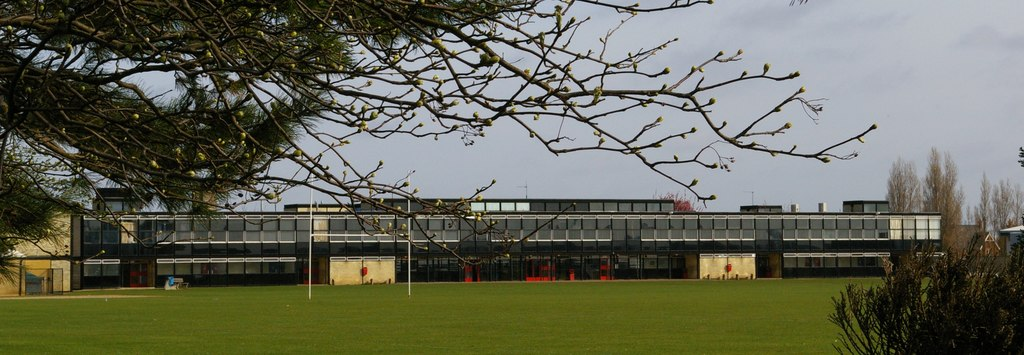
Smithdon High School

Hunstanton School, built between 1949 and 1954, was designed by Alison and Peter Smithson. It was known locally as 'the glasshouse'. The school was strikingly modern in many ways, most notably in its extensive use of glass and steel, and the unusual free-standing water tower.

The Smithsons struggled with reuniting modernist architectural style of the Festival of Britain with the community. Hunstanton School, with its exposed structure and services, with its references to Mies van der Rohe was an answer. It was described by architectural critics as New Brutalism. This was the first time this description had been used, and was then adopted to describe all buildings of this genre, and profoundly influenced school design and public buildings.

The school's main building was designated a Grade II* listed building in 1993. The school gymnasium was listed at Grade II* the same year.

=== Description ===
This is a two-storey, flat roofed, roughly symmetrical rectangular block with two internal courtyards and a central double-height hall spanning two main ranges. The classrooms are all on the first floor reached by individual stair columns- or columns that service at most three classrooms. This was done to prevent the perceived noise and disruption caused by long corridors. The classrooms were fully glazed, with obscured panels below cill height. It was built using a galvanised steel frame with buff sandlime brick infill. The steel framed windows were fitted without subframes. There were single storeyed workshops and kitchens to north. A feature is the steel framed water tower with steel tanks, built between the blocks.

The extensive use of glazing was a feature, but has become an environmental problem, as it produced a cold building in winter, and effectively a greenhouse in summer.

== See also ==
- List of Brutalist structures
