= St Clement's High School =

Location
- Churchgate Way; Terrington St Clement, Norfolk, PE34 4LZ; England
- Coordinates: 52°45′41″N 0°17′52″E

Information
- Type: Academy
- Trust: West Norfolk Academies Trust
- Department for Education URN: 140557 Tables
- Ofsted: Reports
- Head teacher: N Willingham
- Gender: Coeducational
- Age: 11 to 16
- Enrollment: 632
- Capacity: 650
- Website: http://www.stclementshigh.org.uk

St Clement's High School is a coeducational secondary school with academy status, located in the village of Terrington St Clement, in the English county of Norfolk.

== History ==
Having at first been judged one of the most improved comprehensives in England in 2000, St. Clement's was judged to be inadequate in March 2013 after an Ofsted inspection and was placed in special measures.

The school converted to academy status on 1 February 2014. St Clement's High School became part of the West Norfolk Academies Trust alongside three other high schools and a number of primary schools.

In January 2017, an Ofsted inspection judged the school to be good, citing the work of a "diligent headteacher" and stating that "The historic low performance, and poor pupil behaviour, of the predecessor school are in the past".

== Academics ==
Virtually all maintained schools and academies follow the National Curriculum, and are inspected by Ofsted on how well they succeed in delivering a 'broad and balanced curriculum'. The school has to decide whether to try to compress the three year Key Stage 3 into two. St Clements has decided that it is more important to give its students a broad basic education before starting the GCSE exam orientated Key Stage 4. St Clement features overseas residential trips to Berlin, New York and the World War I battlefields. There are biennial ski- trips to Austria. Parents are given two years warning so they can save up- and to maximise the number of students who can participate.

=== Key Stage 3 ===
Students are taught in five ability groups. Each student is placed in a separate ability set for English and Maths and in a third ability set for all other subjects as shown below. Ability sets are reviewed regularly to ensure each student is appropriately placed.

Key Stage 3
Core
| Maths | | English | |
Other
| Art | Citizenship | Design and Technology | Drama |
| French | Geography | History | ICT |
| PE | Science | Music | |

During year 9 students provision of CIAG will increase and students will be given more focused careers guidance and subject advice in preparation for choosing their options for KS4. From September 2020 students make their decisions in the Summer term of Year 9 and start their GCSE courses at the start of Year 10.

=== Key Stage 4 ===
All students follow courses in English, maths, science and PE. In addition, all students must study history, geography or French, and they then choose up to three additional subjects from those available as shown in the table below:

Key Stage 4
Core
| Maths | English | Science | PHRE |
| French | Geography | History | Core PE |
Options (three chosen)
| Art | Business Studies | Catering & Hospitality | Citizenship |
| Design and Technology | Drama | ICT | PE |
| Photography | Music | Religious Studies | |

The statutory content in Religious Studies is covered in PSHE.

== See also ==
- Springwood High School, King's Lynn
- King's Lynn Academy
- King Edward VII Academy
- Smithdon High School
