= Marshland High School =

Location
- School Road; West Walton, Norfolk, PE14 7HA; England
- 52°41′46″N 0°11′11″E

Information
- Type: Academy
- Trust: West Norfolk Academies Trust
- Department for Education URN: 142396 Tables
- Ofsted: Reports
- Headteacher: C Jansen
- Gender: Mixed
- Age: 11 to 16
- Website: http://www.marshlandhigh.co.uk

Marshland High School is a mixed secondary school in the King's Lynn and West Norfolk District of Norfolk, England, and in the village of West Walton (near Wisbech).

== Description ==
Previously a foundation school administered by Norfolk County Council, Marshland High School converted to academy status in November 2015, however the school continues to coordinate with Norfolk County Council for admissions. It is part of the West Norfolk Academies Trust.

In 2018 and again in 2024 Marshland received a 'good' rating from Ofsted.

== Curriculum ==
Virtually all maintained schools and academies follow the National Curriculum, and are inspected by Ofsted on how well they succeed in delivering a 'broad and balanced curriculum'.

=== Key Stage 3 ===
The school, Marshland, decided in 2016 that Key Stage 3 should contains years 7, 8 and 9's as pupils would be better served by doing a three-year exam-focused Key Stage 4. The increasing number of students entering the school with very poor literacy skills and social skills is a concern. This is no longer the case. Later on, Marshland decided to change back to KS3 containing pupils of Years 7, 8 and 9. Which GSCE's are chosen in the late year 9.

=== Key Stage 4 ===
Key Stage 4 currently contains years 10 and 11. Approximately 60% of the teaching time is dedicated to the core curriculum. Student will study GCSEs in: English Language and English Literature, Mathematics and either a double award trilogy science course or a triple award separate sciences. Additional time is given to the following non-examined subjects: Core PE (non-examined) and Skills for Life.

Students are then offered 4 optional subjects which leads to a GSCE or a BTEC Level 2 vocational qualification. German and French are the languages offered.

== Notable alumni ==
- Neil Shephard, Frank B. Baird Jr. Professor of Science in the Department of Economics and the Department of Statistics at Harvard University, studied at the school
- Jody Cundy, multiple world and Paralympic champion in swimming and cycling studied at the school from 1990 to 1995
