= Terrington St Clement =

Village in Norfolk, England

Coordinates: 52.7546°N 0.2947°E

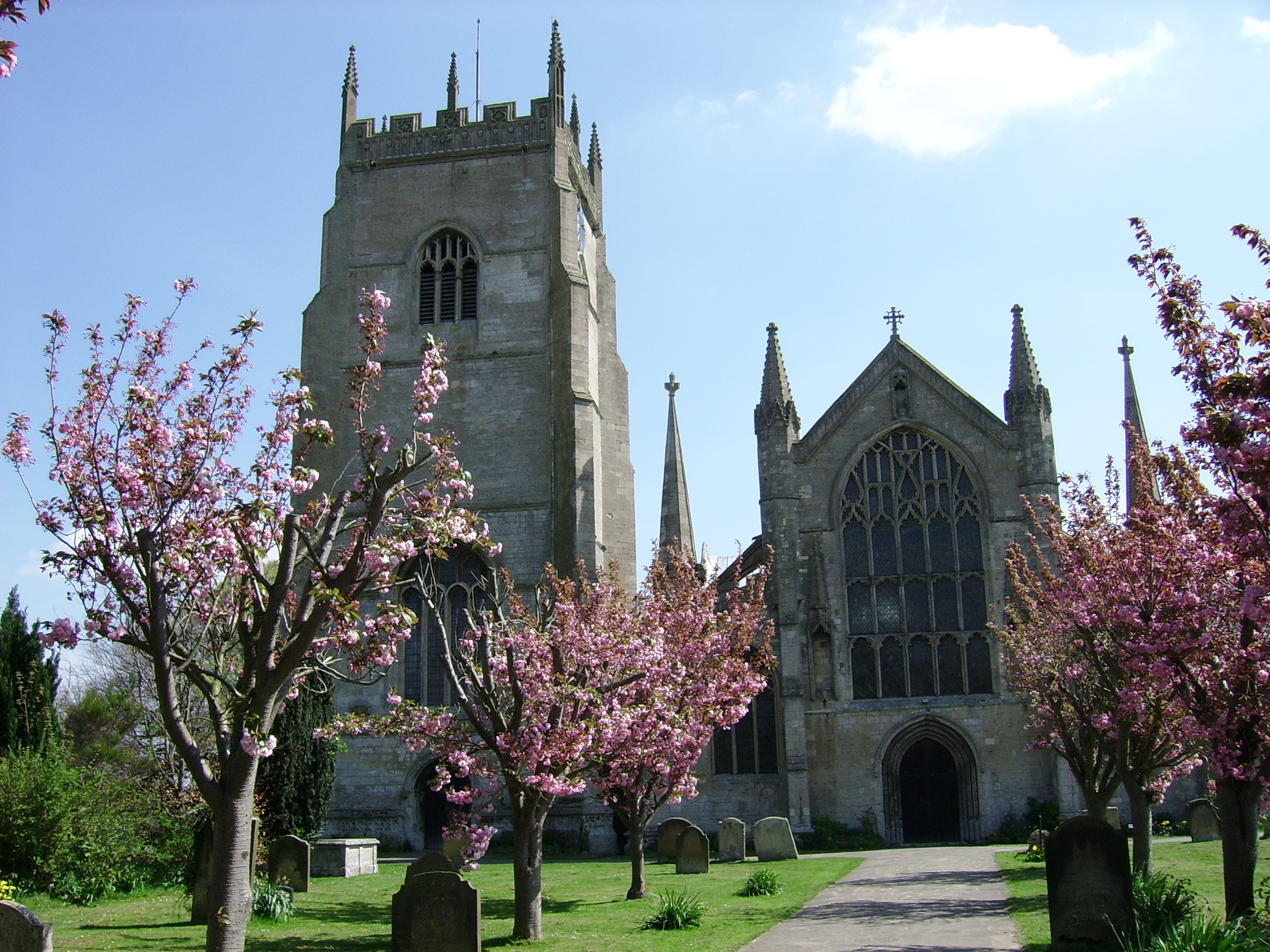
- Terrington Parish Church

- Location within Norfolk
- Area: 45.38 km^{2} (17.52 sq mi)
- Population: 4,125 (2011)
  - Density: 91/km^{2} (240/sq mi)
- OS grid reference: TF548199
- District: King's Lynn and West Norfolk
- Shire county: Norfolk
- Region: East
- Country: England
- Sovereign state: United Kingdom
- Post town: KING'S LYNN
- Postcode district: PE34
- Dialling code: 01553
- Police: Norfolk
- Fire: Norfolk
- Ambulance: East of England
- UK Parliament: North West Norfolk

Terrington St Clement is a village and civil parish in King's Lynn and West Norfolk borough and district in Norfolk, England. It is in the drained marshlands to the south of the Wash, 7 miles (11 km) west of King's Lynn, Norfolk, and 5 miles (8.0 km) east of Sutton Bridge, Lincolnshire, on the old route of the A17 trunk road.

The parish covers an area of 17.50 square miles (50 km^{2}). Much of the farmland is of alluvial silt and clay which has been reclaimed from the sea. About half the parish has been reclaimed from the east bank of the River Nene, in Anglo-Saxon times. It is bordered by the so called Roman Bank, which is of a later than Roman date. The other half has been reclaimed from The Wash since the end of the 18th century.

Terrington St Clement in area is the largest village in Norfolk, and the second largest in the country.

== History ==
The name Terrington derives from the Old English for 'Farm/settlement of Tir(a)'s people' as -ingtūn means a settlement called after, or connected with... .

=== Iron Age, salt winning ===
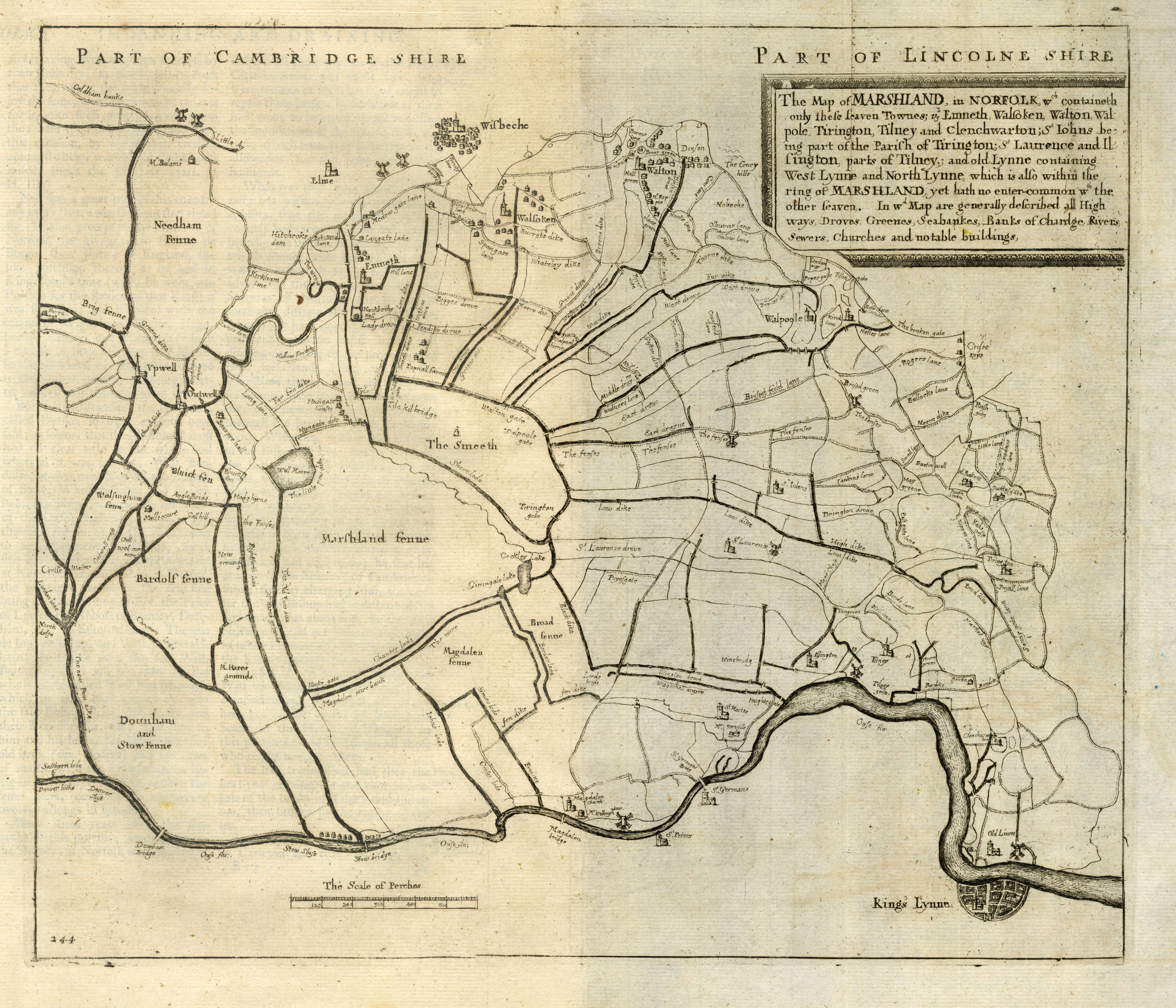
"The Map of the marshland in Norfolk" from "The history of imbanking and drayning" by William Dugdale (1662). North is right, as is Tirington.

During the Iron Age, salt making was a large industry around The Wash. It bloomed during the Roman period. The village produced one ton of salt a year in the late 16th century. The industry kept on going into the 17th century. During low tide, 2-3 centimeter (an inch) of silt was taken from the surface and put on a filter bed. Sea water was used to wash the salt out of the silt. The resulting brine was cooked to harvest the salt. The industry used local peat as fuel. The left over mounts of silt were left in place, gradually raising the ground. In later ages the mounts provided a solid basis, firm ground, to build upon. An example of the remnant mounts can be seen on modern satellite maps, between Beacon Hill Lane and Orange Row Road, which is called Scottesgate on the 1662 Dugdale map. Nearby street names like Pope's Lane, Brellows Hill and Cobbs Hill refer to salt winning families.

=== Early Middle Age ===
In AD 1013 Godric, son of Æthelstan Mannessune gifted part of the lands of Terrington ("Ticingetona") to the monks of Ramsey Abbey in his will where his brother, Eadnoth the Younger had been abbott. This is recorded in the S 1518 Charter.

The settlement, along with Terrington St John, is referred to in the Domesday Book as Tilinghetuna where the population is recorded as 25 households made up of 12 villagers, 11 smallholders, 1 freeman, and 1 slave in 1086. Other resources recorded in 1086 included 515 sheep, 14 pigs, 11 cattle, and 1 cob with 48 acres of meadow and 12.5 salthouses. In 1066, before the Norman conquest of England the two lands were held by Thorkil, and by Thorth (son of Ulfkil). By 1086 the lands of Thorkil were transferred to Hermer de Ferrers, and the land of Thorth to Ralph Baynard.

=== Late Middle Age ===
By the medieval period, the small settlement which began on raised ground on the edge of the marsh had grown substantially. A parish church, dedicated to St Clement (Pope Clement I), known as the "Cathedral of the Marshland" or the "Cathedral of the Fens", was built in the 14th century by Edmund Gonville, Rector of Terrington, who founded Gonville Hall (now Gonville and Caius College) at Cambridge University.

John Colton (died 1404), Lord Chancellor of Ireland and Archbishop of Armagh, was born in the village.

Methodists were established in the village in 1813. During the Victorian era a Wesleyan Methodist chapel, a Primitive Methodist chapel, a Salvation Army headquarters and three other mission chapels were established.

The area has been the subject of some historical research by local residents, while archaeological investigation has included field walking during the Fenland Survey, although this largely excluded the area around the present settlement. Archaeological test pits were dug between 2005 and 2009; the report was published online.

Terrington railway station once served the settlement.

== Community facilities ==
Terrington St Clement facilities include two doctor's surgeries, a village hall and a scout hut. Commercial amenities include a supermarket, a post office, a farm shop, a newsagent's, a baker's, a fish & chip shop, a Chinese takeaway, a hairdresser's, an estate agent, and a hardware store; there are two public houses, the King William and the Wildfowler.

The village is linked to King's Lynn, Spalding, and Wisbech by bus services.

=== Education ===
Terrington St Clement has state-run primary and secondary schools. St Clement's High School was the centre of some press attention, firstly when its previous head, Richard Wealthall, was singled out for praise and a visit from Prime Minister Tony Blair, and again subsequently when he was found to have been guilty of bullying and nepotism.

Both St. John Primary School and St. Clement's High School were given the rating good at the latest school inspections by Ofsted in January and April 2023.

== Notable people ==
- John Colton (died 1404), Archbishop of Armagh
- Keith Rudd (1946-2025), former cricketer
