= Downham Market =

Market town in Norfolk, England

Coordinates: 52.60°N 0.39°E

- The Clock Tower and Town Hall

- Location within Norfolk
- Area: 5.20 km^{2} (2.01 sq mi)
- Population: 9,994 (2011 Census)
  - Density: 1,922/km^{2} (4,980/sq mi)
- OS grid reference: TF611032
- District: King's Lynn and West Norfolk
- Shire county: Norfolk
- Region: East
- Country: England
- Sovereign state: United Kingdom
- Post town: DOWNHAM MARKET
- Postcode district: PE38
- Dialling code: 01366
- Police: Norfolk
- Fire: Norfolk
- Ambulance: East of England
- UK Parliament: South West Norfolk

Downham Market, sometimes simply referred to as Downham, is a market town and civil parish in Norfolk, England. It lies on the edge of the Fens and on the Great Ouse; it is approximately 11 miles (18 km) south of King's Lynn, 39 miles (63 km) west of Norwich and 30 miles (48 km) north of Cambridge.

The civil parish has an area of 2.0 square miles (5.2 km^{2}) and at the 2011 census had a population of 9,994 in 4,637 households. It now includes the hamlet of Broomhill, formerly part of Wimbotsham parish to the north of the town.

The town was an agricultural centre, developing as a market for the produce of the Fens with a bridge across the Ouse. During the Middle Ages, it was famed for its butter market and also hosted a notable horse fair. The market is now held Fridays and Saturdays.

Notable buildings in the town include its medieval parish church, dedicated to St Edmund, and the Victorian clock tower, constructed in 1878. The town is also known as the place where Charles I hid after the Battle of Naseby. In 2004, the town completed a regeneration project on the Market Place, moving the market to the town hall car park. The decorative town sign depicts the crown and arrows of St Edmund with horses to show the importance of the horse fairs in the town's history. A heritage centre, Discover Downham, opened in a former fire station in 2016. The town is twinned with Civray, Vienne, in France.

== Toponymy ==
The town's name means 'Hill homestead/village' with a market; it is situated on a terrace overlooking the Great Ouse.

== History ==
=== Economy ===
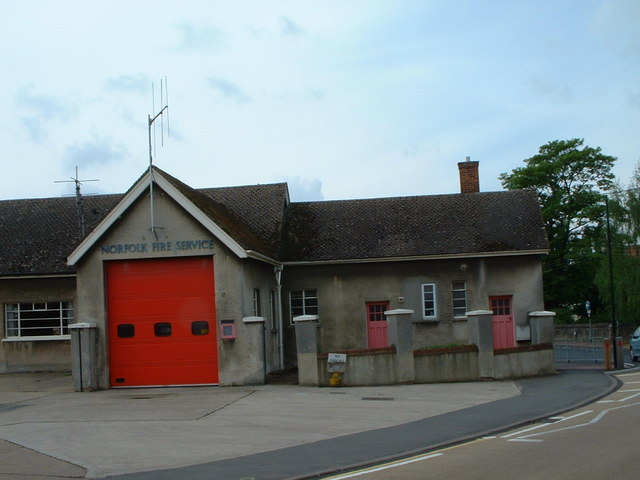
The former fire station in 2006, now a heritage centre

Historically, Downham Market was an important market centre for the surrounding agricultural area. It incorporated a famous horse fair and weekly livestock and butter markets. There were several maltings in the town supplying the brewing trade in the town, at a time when beer was often safer to drink than well water.

Before the arrival of the railway in 1846, the riverside was largely agricultural with warehousing for river transport centred on the Great Ouse at Downham West. With the coming of the railway, there was a rapid industrial and residential development into Downham Market.

Jacob Mason Bird built his steam mill by the railway. The mill, now run by Heygates, is still known as Bird’s Mill. Other industries grew too as the railway became the focus for warehousing, the loading of cattle and products, and the building of railway housing.

=== Landmarks ===
The Town Clock, built by William Cunliffe in 1878, is a Grade II-listed structure. Made of cast iron, the clock was originally bronzed and relieved on the prominent parts with gold. Later, the clock was painted bottle green and its current black-and-white finish was applied during the 2004 restoration.

The town's war memorial stands at the junction of London Road and Church Road; it was dedicated in October 1921 to the dead of World War I. It was paid for by public subscription and built by H.J. Long, a local stonemason. The memorial originally commemorated 73 local servicemen who fell in the First World War with the names of the dead of World War II added later. In 2005, Evelyn Irene Murrell, who died in 1918, a member of the WRAF was belatedly added to the list of names. The memorial bears the crown-and-arrows symbol of the town and of the martyred King St Edmund of East Anglia, to whom the church is dedicated.

=== Notable buildings ===
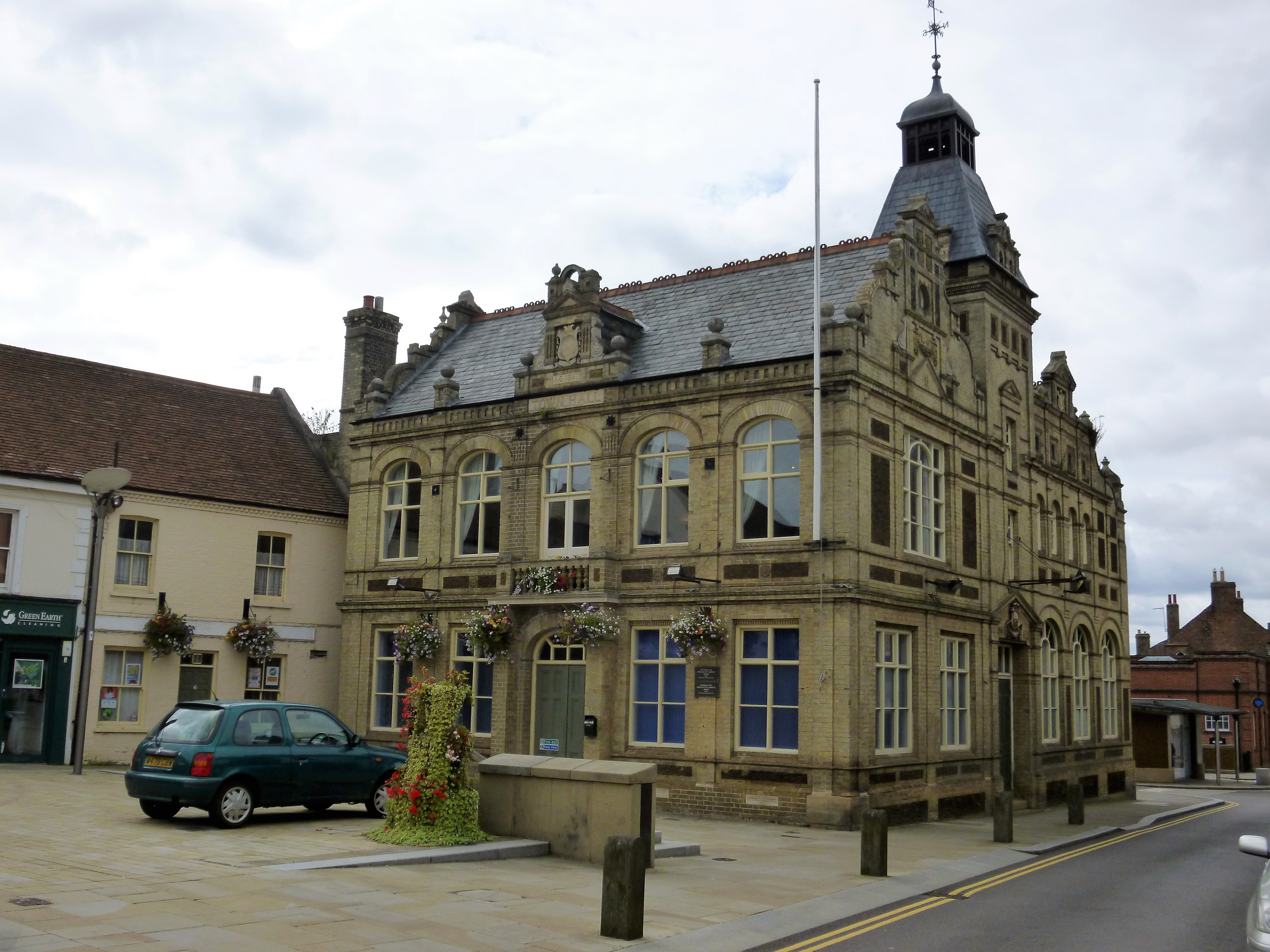
The town hall

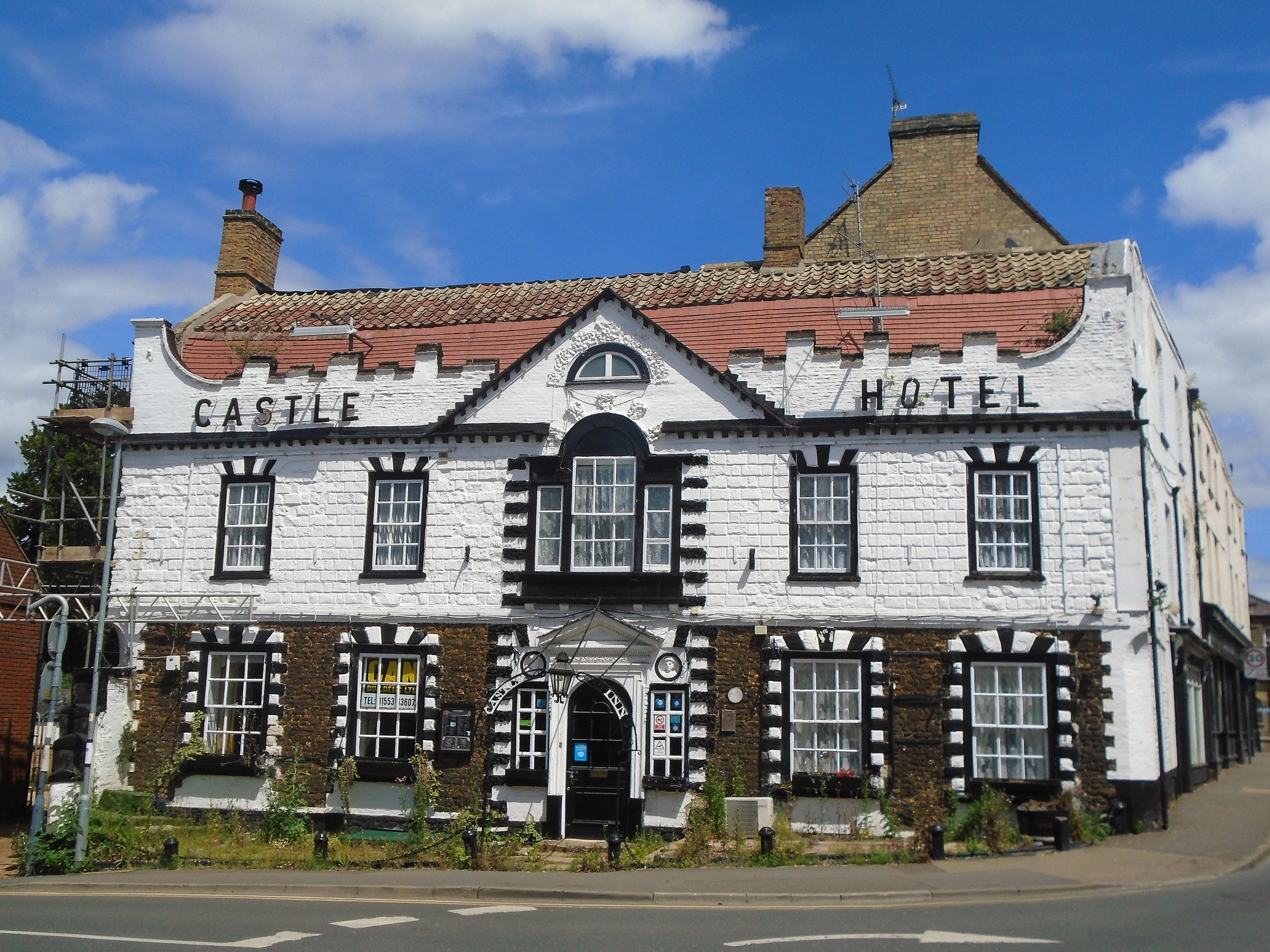
Castle Hotel (2022)

Downham Market is sometimes known as the Gingerbread Town because of the characteristic local carrstone used for its buildings since medieval times.

St Edmund’s Church is a good example of this and is Downham’s only Grade I-listed building. It stands in a dominant position overlooking the flat fenlands to the west. The Church like the town was probably an Anglo-Saxon foundation, but was rebuilt in the 13th century Early English period; it was altered extensively in the 15th and 16th centuries, during the Perpendicular and Tudor periods.

The Old Court House located on London Road was where the magistrates dispensed justice in the Clackclose Hundred from 1861.

The Castle Hotel is Grade II-listed and features a distinctive battlemented parapet. It is a mainly 18th-century building, but the core is probably earlier. In the past, visitors stayed here for hunting, shooting and fishing in the local area. The hotel had its own transport to and from railway station, and out on shooting parties. The building closed as a hotel and restaurant in 2020 and is set to be developed into flats.

Downham Market Town Hall, on the west side of the old Market Hill, was built by public subscription in 1887/8.

Opposite the Town Hall is a coaching inn, The Crown Hotel. Just inside the arched entrance are steps leading to a mounting block for horsemen. Before the Court House was built, magistrates met here. In May 1816, it was the scene of riots when the magistrates were besieged by angry, starving agricultural labourers demanding a living wage of two shillings a day and the release of poachers. Two of the Downham rioters, Daniel Harwood and Thomas Thody, were hanged on 31 August 1816.

The 18th-century Dial House, located on Station Road, was once a private school for gentlemen in the 1860s. Its name is derived from the sundial painted high on the wall. Today, the building is a bed and breakfast.

== Governance ==
For the purposes of local government, the parish falls within the district of King's Lynn and West Norfolk. The Norfolk County Council electoral division of Downham Market covers a lesser area than that of the parish; the population of this division taken at the 2011 Census was 7,988. In February 2022, eight town councillors, including the mayor Jenny Groom, resigned over claims of bullying.

The town forms part of South West Norfolk parliamentary constituency

== Education ==
There are two primary schools in Downham Market:

- Nelson Academy, situated on Nursery Road, was originally named Clackclose Community Primary School, after Clackclose Hundred. The school opened in 1873 on Snape Lane. It was the first primary education academy sponsored by the CWA Academy Trust, founded by the College of West Anglia, in 2014. It is named after Lord Nelson who, according to local folklore, attended his first school in Downham Market
- Hillcrest Primary School is on Bexwell Road, and was opened in 1980 as Hillcrest First and Middle School. It is named after Hillcrest, the road connecting Bexwell Road and Civray Avenue. In 2018, the school began work on a new £4.5m nine classroom building.

Downham Market Academy, formerly Downham Market GM High School, is a secondary school and sixth form with academy status, The academy was launched on 1 July 2013, forms part of the CWA Academy Trust and was founded by the College of West Anglia. Teaching is shared between two sites, with the main Bexwell campus housing pupils years seven to 11 and the Downham Market Academy Sixth Form (formerly Downham Market College) campus offering A-levels to sixth form pupils.

Downham Preparatory School and Montessori Nursery is a non-selective independent preparatory school for girls and boys aged three months to 13 years. The school was founded by Elizabeth Laffeaty-Sharpe in 1984, for children aged two to five years.

Downham Market's library is located in the Priory Centre.

== Transport ==
Downham Market station

Downham Market railway station lies on the Fen Line, with services operated by Great Northern between London Kings Cross and King's Lynn. There are additional services to London Liverpool Street at peak times, operated by Greater Anglia.

Bus routes are operated by Go to Town and Lynx, which connect the town with King's Lynn, Swaffham, Southery, Fincham and Three Holes.

Downham Market is on the north–south A10 road, which connects London with King's Lynn. The east-west A1122 from Outwell to Swaffham runs south of the town.

The Great Ouse and Great Ouse Relief Channel flows through the western boundary of the town. The Great Ouse Relief Channel was made navigable in 2001, when the Environment Agency constructed a lock at Denver to provide access. Moorings are located next to the Station Road bridge. The river is a popular spot for boating and swimming.

== Sport and leisure ==
The War Memorial Playing Fields includes a children’s playground, tennis and squash courts, a sports bar and a multi-purpose sports court.

A non-league football club, Downham Town F.C., plays at the Memorial Field.

The Willows nature reserve was once one of the town's brickfields.

The Jubilee Community Centre, located on Howdale Road, hosts local Workshops, classes, child-care and community events. The Community Centre has a large field adjacent.

The Downham Market Heritage Centre includes interactive displays focused on local history. The centre includes free wifi, an internet café and research facilities with small library.

== Notable people ==
- George William Manby (1765–1854), inventor of the Manby mortar and the first modern form of fire extinguisher, was educated in the town
- George Henry Dashwood (1801–69), antiquary, was born in the town
- Golding Bird (1814–54), Fellow of the Royal College of Physicians of London; became an authority on kidney diseases
- Jim Russell (1920–2019), racing driver
- Patrick Holman (1945–), cricketer, was born in the town.
- Richard Murphy (1958–), political economist
- Liz Truss (1975–), former Conservative MP for South West Norfolk and UK prime minister.

== See also ==
- RAF Downham Market
