= Acle Academy =

Location
- South Walsham Road; Acle, Norfolk, NR13 3ER; England
- 52.6423°N 1.5416°E

Information
- Type: Academy
- Motto: Respect, Aspiration and Determination
- Established: 1959
- Local authority: Norfolk
- Trust: Wensum Trust UID:16207
- Department for Education URN: 138758 Tables
- Ofsted: Reports
- Headteacher: Helen Watts
- Gender: Mixed
- Age: 11 to 16
- Enrollment: 550
- Capacity: 711
- Colours: Navy and Light Blue and Black
- Executive Head: Daniel Thrower
- Website: www.acle.norfolk.sch.uk

The Acle Academy, formerly known as Acle High School, is a secondary school which is located in Acle, Norfolk, England. This is in the centre of the Norfolk Broads. The academy status school has 700 pupils, ranging in age from 11 to 16 years old.

== Description ==
Acle Academy is a co-educational secondary school for pupils aged 11–16. It first opened in 1959 as a secondary modern it cooperates with feeder schools and local businesses, and external providers. It expanded and changed status to a non-selective comprehensive school following the directive of the 1960s. The school became a stand-alone academy in 2012 and four years later joined The Wensum Trust.

== Academics ==
The school operates a three-year, Key Stage 3 where all the core National Curriculum subjects are taught. Year 7 and Year 8 study core subjects: English, Mathematics, Science. The following foundation subjects are offered: Art & Design, Computing, Design & Technology, Drama, Ethics & Life Skills PSHE & RE, French, German, Geography and History, Music and PE.

In 10 and 11, that is in Key Stage 4 students study a core of English Language, English Literature, Mathematics, Science: Core & Additional or Combined, Ethics & Life Skills (including Religious Education & Sex and Relationship Education. Called Character and Culture) and Physical Education. Students have four options that are studied for five hours a fortnight. These are chosen from a pool of BTEC Business Studies, BTEC Hospitality and Catering, and GCSE Drama, French, German, Further Additional Science (Called Separate Sciences), Geography, History, Music, and PE (GCSE). In the 2026 Academic Year, they plan to add Travel and Tourism, Health and Social Care and Religious Studies

== Ofsted ==
It was inspected by Ofsted in 2013 and rated good. At the inspection in 2015 leaders were criticised for have not "had an accurate understanding of the quality of teaching in the academy. This has led to a failure to address poor practice and slowed progress."

"Monitoring of achievement has been inaccurate. Unreliable assessment practices mean that too often, learning is planned that does not challenge pupils appropriately."

The January 2016 Ofsted report found Acle Academy to be an "Inadequate" in all areas.

In 2019 Ofsted monitored the school and wrote to the governors saying: "Detailed development plans are used effectively by you and your leadership team to gauge the rate of progress being made in improving the school. You feel that new appointments have ensured that you have 'the right people in the right posts' to enable the school to improve further and that there are no significant barriers preventing the school from being judged good at its next inspection. The school's small size and staffing changes mean that leaders and some staff have taken more responsibility for making improvements. Finances are tightly managed and you value the support of the trust in helping you to do this.."
