= Springwood High School, King's Lynn =

Springwood High School

Location
- Queensway; King's Lynn, Norfolk, PE30 4AW; England; 52.7608°N 0.4330°E

Information
- Type: Academy
- Motto: A centre of excellence where imagination becomes reality.
- Established: 1979
- Local authority: Norfolk
- Trust: West Norfolk Academies Trust
- Specialist: Performing Arts
- Department for Education URN: 136515 Tables
- Ofsted: Reports
- Head teacher: Andrew Johnson
- Staff: 150~
- Gender: Mixed
- Age: 11 to 18
- Enrolment: 1700~
- Website: http://www.springwoodhighschool.co.uk/

Springwood High School is a secondary school with academy status in the town of King's Lynn in Norfolk, England. It was formed by the merger of several schools when the government began to abolish the tripartite system in the mid-1960s. Springwood has over 1700 pupils, including a sixth form with over 300 pupils and has been designated a Specialist Performing Arts College.

Ofsted consistently rate the school as "good", the most recent inspection having been in November 2022.

== History ==
Springwood was formed in 1979 by the merger of the Alderman Catleugh Secondary School and the King's Lynn Girls High School. The name Springwood was chosen for the newly formed school due to the main site being adjacent to the Spring Wood.

At the beginning of the 2010–11 academic year, Andrew Johnson took over as headteacher from Peter Hopkins, who had been part of the school since 1995.

Springwood is part of the West Norfolk Academies Trust, a group of four secondary schools and seven primary schools.

== Site ==
There were three sites for the school, the old Alderman Catleugh at the end of Queensway with its two wings and in excess of 20 mobile classrooms, the new block of the girls High School also on Queensway and a smaller original site of the girls High School located in King Street in the town centre. The two main sites were used for 11 - 16 schooling whilst the town centre site was used for the Sixth Form, the King Street site eventually being sold off for a housing complex and the main two sites being upgraded and extended.

== Curriculum ==
The school runs a three-year Key Stage 3, leaving two years for students to prepare for GCSEs.

Ofsted reported in 2017:

Pupils learn within a calm, orderly environment and enjoy positive relationships with their teachers and with each other. They speak articulately and with confidence, wear their uniform with pride, and treat the school site with respect. Leaders and teachers emphasise the importance of academic achievement; pupils respond to these high expectations by working diligently – often with evident enthusiasm.

== See also ==
- King's Lynn Academy
- King Edward VII Academy
- St Clement's High School
