= John Johnson (architect, born 1843) =

English architect (1843–1919)

John Johnson (born in London; 1843 – 1919) was an English architect.

== Career ==
Johnson was a member of the Architectural Association from 1863, and designed a number of notable churches and civic commissions from the 1870s. He was described as a surveyor in 1891, and as an architect by 1901. He practiced from around 1881 to 1914.
