= College of West Anglia =

College in England

The College of West Anglia
- Former names: King's Lynn Technical School; Norfolk College of Arts and Technology; Cambridgeshire College of Agriculture and Horticulture; Isle College
- Motto: Changing lives through learning
- Established: 1894
- Principal: David Pomfret
- Students: 7,400
- Location: King's Lynn in Norfolk, Wisbech and Milton in Cambridgeshire, United Kingdom
- Website: cwa.ac.uk

The College of West Anglia (often abbreviated to CoWA or CWA) is a four-campus college of further and higher education in Cambridgeshire and Norfolk, England. The college has three campuses, located in King's Lynn, Milton and Wisbech, Cambridgeshire, as well as a sports campus at Alive Lynnsport in King's Lynn. The college has approximately 7,400 students and 750 staff.

The college is the result of mergers of smaller colleges. King's Lynn Technical School (founded in 1894), King's Lynn, Norfolk. A merger with the Cambridgeshire College of Agriculture and Horticulture to form the College of West Anglia in 1998. A merger with the Isle College, Wisbech (founded Isle of Ely, 1955), Cambridgeshire in 2006, retaining the College of West Anglia name.

== Overview ==
The College of West Anglia educates over 10,000 full-time and part-time students each academic year, across a wide range of vocational and academic fields. In addition to full-time and part-time courses, the college also offers bespoke training for local businesses, apprenticeships and higher education courses, run in partnership with Anglia Ruskin University. The college has around 750 members of staff working across the three main campuses, and its other premises.

Under the previous Ofsted inspection criteria, the college was rated outstanding (grade 1) in 2007-2008. The most recent Ofsted inspection in 2019 ranked the college as good (grade 2).

== Campuses ==
In 2009, building work commenced on the existing sites in King's Lynn, Milton and Wisbech at a cost of over £35 million. The work includes two new technology centres at King's Lynn and Wisbech, both of which opened in 2013, a renovation of the tower block at King's Lynn and redevelopment at the Milton campus, including a bespoke higher education area.

In 2012, the college moved its sport provision to Lynnsport and Leisure Centre, in collaboration with King's Lynn and West Norfolk borough council. In association with Freebridge Community Housing and the Benjamin Foundation, the college's foundation studies is provision is located at separate premises in King's Lynn. The college received a £1.75m grant from the government in 2012 to develop a creative arts centre specialising in TV, film and performing arts at the King's Lynn campus.

In the same year, the college also announced plans to begin a £10 million refurbishment project on its "Tower Block" building within the King's Lynn campus. The plan includes the replacement of all the windows within the building, re-cladding the exterior and building an extension to the ground floor for a new student restaurant and social area.

== History ==
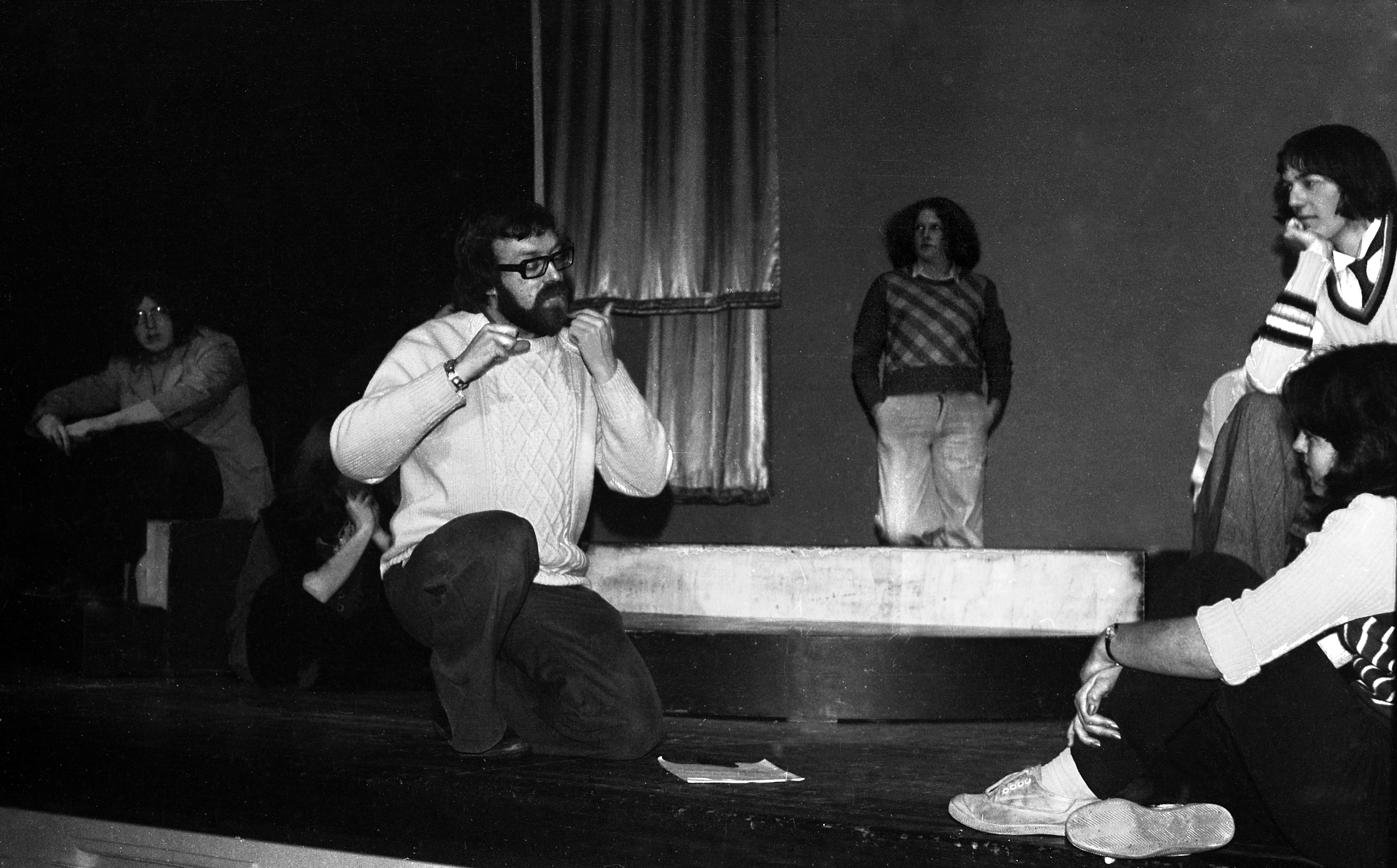
Stephen Fry, right, rehearsing A Midsummer Night's Dream at the Norcat in 1975

The college was founded in 1894 as the King's Lynn Technical School. In 1973 it was renamed The Norfolk College of Arts and Technology, commonly abbreviated to "Norcat". In 1998, Norcat merged with the Cambridgeshire College of Agriculture & Horticulture, which added a land-based provision in Cambridgeshire. The revised institution adopted the name, College of West Anglia. In April 2006, Isle College in Wisbech was added in a further merger, to form the current, enlarged College of West Anglia.

== Principal ==
The college's principal is David Pomfret. Pomfret joined the college in 2005, having previously been principal of Boston College. He has a background in education and training, having worked as a lecturer in business studies. Pomfret represents the college on a wide variety of professional and educational boards within Norfolk and Cambridgeshire.

== Notable alumni ==
- Martin Brundle - racing driver and commentator
- Barbara Parker - track and field athlete for Team GB
- Dan Ashworth - professional footballer, FA director of elite development
- Dom Dwyer - professional footballer, Sporting Kansas City
- Stephen Fry - comedian and actor
- Andy Hunt - former professional footballer
- Deaf Havana - alternative rock band
- Samantha Chapman - make-up artist
- Sarah Gillespie - Singer Songwriter
