= RHSC =

RHSC may stand for:

- Reproductive Health Supplies Coalition
- Royal Heraldry Society of Canada
- Royal Hospital for Sick Children, Edinburgh, Scotland
- Royal Hospital for Children, Glasgow, Scotland
- Reepham High School and College in Norfolk, England
- “Red-Headed Stepchild”, used to describe unloved children from a spouse's former relationship
