= Great Yarmouth Charter Academy =

Location
- Salisbury Road; Great Yarmouth, Norfolk, NR30 4LS; England; 52.62007°N 1.7366°E

Information
- Type: Free school
- Religious affiliation: Christian
- Established: 1551; 475 years ago
- Local authority: Norfolk
- Trust: Inspiration Trust
- Department for Education URN: 142883 Tables
- Principal: Dean Rosembert
- Staff: 102
- Gender: Co-educational
- Age: 11 to 19
- Enrolment: 894 pupils
- Capacity: 1500
- Colours: Red and black
- Website: http://www.gyca.org.uk

Great Yarmouth Charter Academy is a coeducational comprehensive school on Salisbury Road in the town of Great Yarmouth in the English county of Norfolk. It educates about 920 eleven- to nineteen-year-old pupils, the age of entry having decreased from twelve to eleven in 2008. The school is host to the Sir Isaac Newton East sixth form which is partnered to Norwich-based Sir Isaac Newton Sixth Form. The nearest other post-16 centres are East Coast College - (Great Yarmouth Campus) and the East Norfolk Sixth Form College in the Gorleston-on-Sea area of the town.

== History ==
The former Great Yarmouth Grammar School, which was founded in 1551, became the comprehensive Great Yarmouth High School in September 1982. It is also the ultimate successor institution for the Great Yarmouth High School for Girls. In 1998 the school was awarded Technology College Specialist Status and in 1999 was designated V.A (Christian non-denominational) reflecting the terms of its Foundation, under the jurisdiction of Norfolk LEA. In November 2008 the Technology Specialist College status ended as the school became a Humanities Specialist College.

In 2016, the school was rated as "inadequate" in an Ofsted inspection. It was closed and reopened in 2017 as Great Yarmouth Charter Academy, having been taken over by the Inspiration Trust, under the leadership of Barry Smith who introduced a new behaviour policy. A subsequent surprise inspection noted that before the new behaviour policy was introduced, a large number of pupils told the inspector that "they often felt unsafe at school", but that "During this unannounced inspection, all of the large number of pupils who spoke with inspectors said that they now feel safe at school".

=== Merger and aftermath ===
In September 2017 Great Yarmouth Charter Academy and Trafalgar College merged to form a single school. The school operated on two sites until September 2019 when the Thamesfield Way campus closed and all pupils are now taught on the Salisbury Road site.

A sixth form college, Sir Isaac Newton East, was launched in 2021. The college is modelled on and works in partnership with the Sir Isaac Newton Sixth Form in Norwich.

The school branding is based on a simplified version of the arms of the town (gules, three lions of England, dimidiated by azure, three herrings argent).

=== Inspection reports ===
On 21 Feb 2018 an unannounced Ofsted monitoring visit found safeguarding to be effective. Following an inspection in July 2019 the school was rated as "good". The main areas of improvement needed were with 'leadership and management', 'behaviour and attendance' and teaching.

== Notable former pupils ==
=== Great Yarmouth Grammar School ===
- David Edward Bentley, Bishop of Gloucester 1993–2003
- Kenneth Bevan, missionary bishop in China 1940-50
- Sir Arthur Hawkins, Chairman of the Central Electricity Generating Board 1972–77
- John McDonnell, Labour MP for Hayes and Harlington, Shadow Chancellor of the Exchequer
- Kenneth MacMillan, choreographer
- Malcolm Sayer, car designer
- Chris J. Taylor, physicist and Associate Vice President at the University of Manchester
- Robert Steel, Vice-Chancellor 1979–81 of Swansea University, President in 1968 of the Institute of British Geographers (merged with the Royal Geographical Society in 1995)
- Jason Statham, English Actor
- Frederick Adam Wright, Classical scholar

=== Great Yarmouth High School for Girls ===
- Naomi Lewis, poet, essayist and literary critic
