= Jane Austen College =

Secondary school in Norwich, England

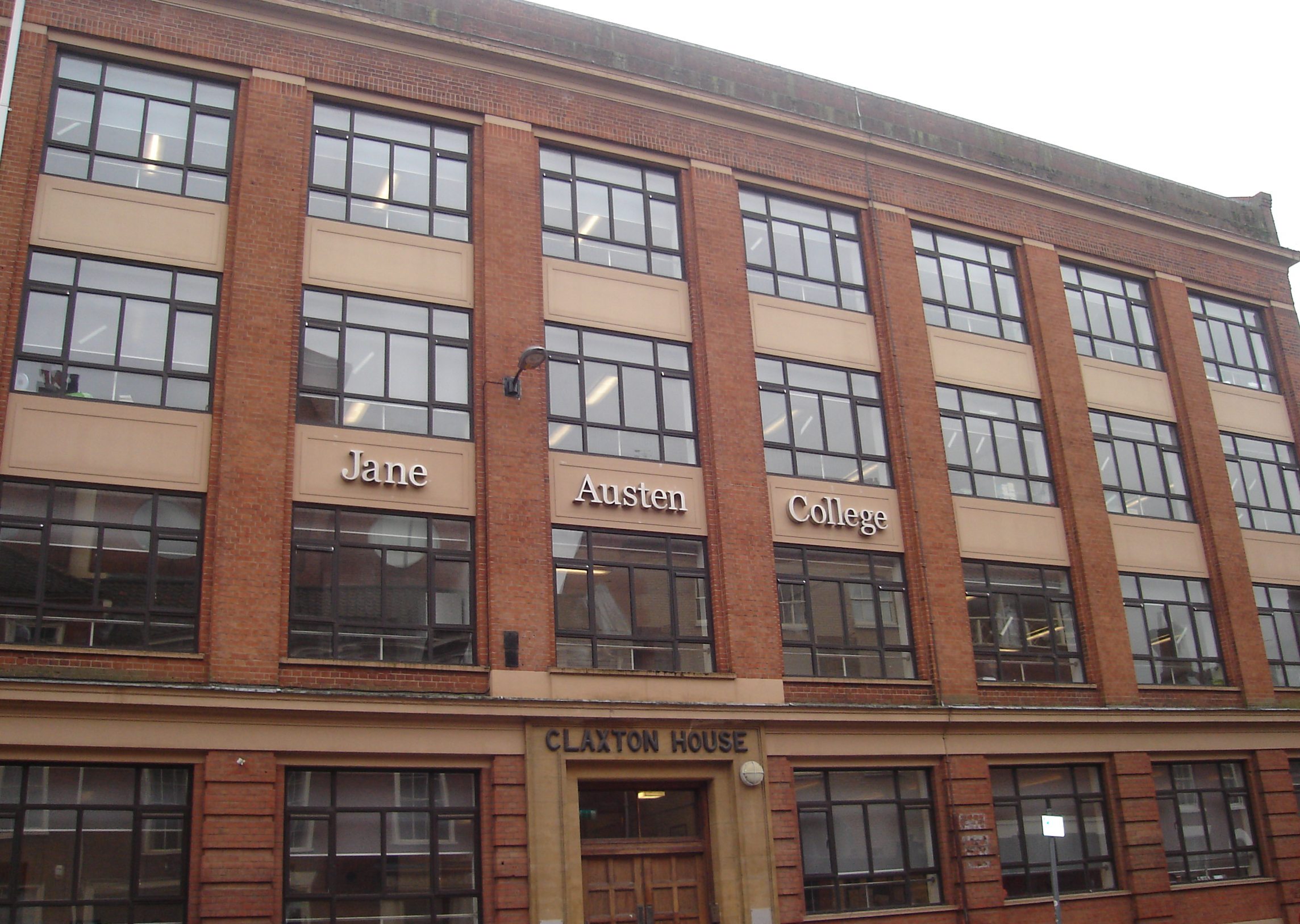
- Jane Austen College

Location
- 46-48 Colegate; Norwich, Norfolk, NR3 1DD; England; 52.6329°N 1.2936°E

Information
- Type: Free school
- Established: September 2014
- Trust: Inspiration Trust
- Department for Education URN: 140815 Tables
- Ofsted: Reports
- Head teacher: Glen Allott
- Gender: Coeducational
- Age: 11 to 19
- Enrolment: 1055
- Capacity: 1100
- Colours: Red, grey, and black
- Website: www.janeaustencollege.co.uk

Jane Austen College is a secondary free school located in Norwich, owned by the Inspiration Trust, that opened in September 2014.

== History ==
Plans for the school were announced in March 2013 with the intention to locate in central Norwich. Jane Austen College was approved by the Department for Education, on 22 May 2013, to open in September 2014.

== Academic organisation ==
The school has an admission number of 180 students per year between Years 7 and 11, and a smaller sixth form. There is an extended school day, with optional sessions running until 5.30pm three days a week for students to complete homework on site. Within the school day students spend dedicated time on an ‘elective’ until year 11, activity of their choice such as choir, football, Dungeons and Dragons, dancing or STEM studies. There is a shorter end time on Mondays and Fridays of 2:50pm.

The school has chosen to compress Key Stage 3 into 2 years, and operate a three-year Key Stage 4 when students are studying GCSEs.

== Qualifications offered ==
The school offers a range of GCSEs with core subjects comprising English, maths, science, PE, humanities, and modern foreign languages as well as options including drama, business studies and computer science. Further qualifications such as the Arts Awards or Duke of Edinburgh's Award are also available through the school's electives programme.

A Level options at the sixth form focus on arts, English, drama, and the humanities, and there is a reciprocal arrangement with nearby Sir Isaac Newton Sixth Form for students who wish to study science, psychology, computer science or maths. In 2018, 88% of A Level students achieved an A* - C grade. In 2025, students achieved 35% A*-A and 90% A*-C overall at A-Level.

== Physical education ==
Pupils travel to the University of East Anglia or The Hewett Academy for sports lessons and some electives. The facilities available at those sites allow teaching of units such as football, hockey, netball and swimming. In 2018 the Eileen Ash Sports Hall was opened on the edge of The Hewett Academy site for use by Jane Austen College.

== Ofsted judgements ==
In 2024, Jane Austen College received an Outstanding rating from Ofsted.
