= Mileham =

Village in Norfolk, England

Coordinates: 52.73751°N 0.83397°E

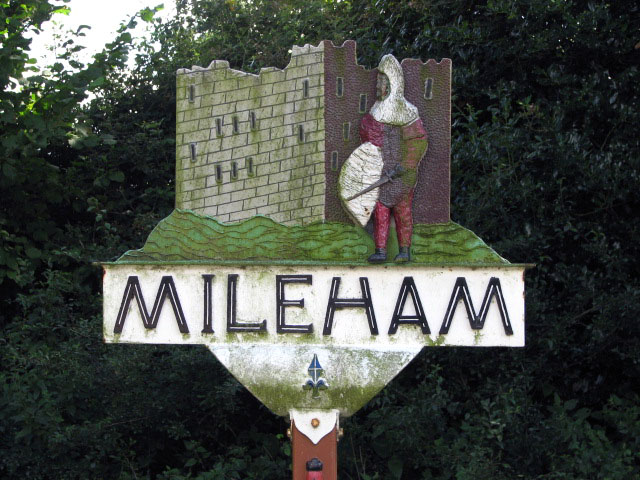
- The village sign, Mileham, Norfolk

- Location within Norfolk
- Area: 11.66 km^{2} (4.50 sq mi)
- Population: 563 (2011 census)
  - Density: 48/km^{2} (120/sq mi)
- OS grid reference: TF910190
  - London: 129 miles (208 km)
- Civil parish: Mileham CP
- District: Breckland
- Shire county: Norfolk
- Region: East
- Country: England
- Sovereign state: United Kingdom
- Post town: KING'S LYNN
- Postcode district: PE32
- Dialling code: 01328
- Police: Norfolk
- Fire: Norfolk
- Ambulance: East of England

Mileham is a village approximately midway between East Dereham and Fakenham in Mid Norfolk with a population of 563 people in 2011. The village sits astride the B1145 Kings Lynn to Mundesley road that dissects Mid Norfolk west to east. It is the old coaching road from Kings Lynn to Norwich and then on to Great Yarmouth.

The name Mileham comes from the presence of a mill; the base of the last one can still be seen from the Litcham Road. (There is a possibility that it may be linked to a Saxon water mill.) There is also a "Mill Farm" to the west of the village. Mileham is a linear settlement in 'High Norfolk', and is also a 'Conservation Village', centred on Burwood Hall, The Church, The Castle, Park Farm, Old Hall Farm and Manor Farm.

There are ruins of a Norman castle (now a nature reserve) near to the site of the Roman Camp and a church, St John the Baptist, with some rare stained glass windows.

== St John the Baptist Church ==
The north tower, which functions as a portal was given by the church's patron Lord Fitzalan. The churchyard is typical of the country parish church, showing gravestones surrounding the building. A medieval tomb in the churchyard retains the remnants of a cross. The west window showing St. Catherine (wheel), St. John the Baptist (lamb) and St. Margaret (spearing dragon) is a rare extant example of stained glass of the decorated style. The window was also added by Lord Fitzalan. Colours of green, gold, olive, amber, as well as red and blue distinguish the complex canopies and figures. In the lower half of the window fragments of 15th-century glass include images of an unidentified female saint and St. Margaret.

The site of the original Saxon village is in the field to the east of the church where the remains of Saxon ponds can be seen.

== Mileham Castle ==
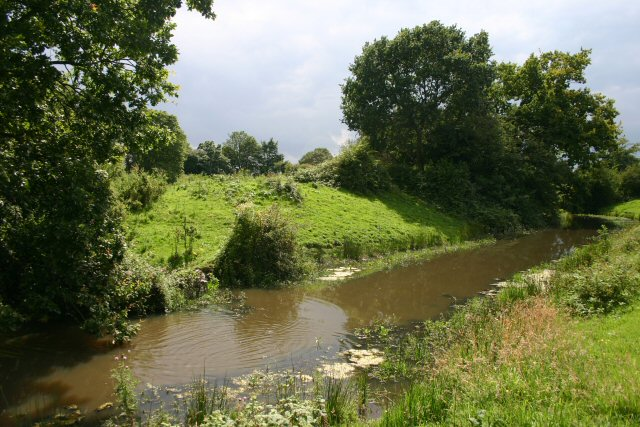
Mileham Castle Moat

Mileham Castle (also referred to as " Hall Yards" on old maps) is one of the largest motte and bailey castles in Norfolk. It straddles the pre-Conquest road that remained the main east-west route through the county until the 17th century. The castle was constructed in about 1100.and its remains form a surprisingly imposing monument consisting of a motte built up around the fragments of a stone keep, two baileys and a further banked rectangular enclosure to the north of the road, which now contains Burwood Hall (built in 1793) and farm buildings. A large wooded deer park was once attached to the south of the castle. The positioning of the castle astride the road is thought to have been connected with raising revenue from a possible market place in the northern enclosure and from tolls on travellers.

== Mileham Windmill ==
Mileham Windmill, was first recorded in 1860, it was built at the end of a long track to the southwest of the village. The four-storey tarred red brick tower had 21-inch-thick (530 mm) walls, was 38 feet (12 m) high and had a 24-foot-diameter (7.3 m) base. The mill used four double-shuttered sails, each with seven bays of three shutters to power four pairs of stones. The upright shaft was a 'graft' shaft of both wood and iron. Two opposite doors were set into the base of the tower on the east and west sides, and another door was on the south side of the meal floor. According to Geraldine Neale, writing in 1948, a sail broke off the mill in a gale in 1904 and a similar occurrence put the mill out of commission for all time. However, it is not clear whether this was the actual case as in May 1973, G. Rye reported to Philip Unwin that the mill ceased working in 1924 and was dismantled soon after. A photograph of 1934 showed the mill with three broken sails and the fanstage still in situ. The mill stands just across the border with Litcham parish.

== Mileham Post Windmill ==
Mileham Post Windmill, first recorded in 1775, stood on Mileham or Beeston Common and was actually nearer to Litcham than Mileham. The mill buck stood over a roundhouse and used 2 pairs of French burr stones, a flour mill and a jumper. A horse mill and bake office were also run on the site.

A sketchmap by Geraldine Neale c.1948, showed the postmill to the north of the western end of the east to west track and the towermill at the north end of the south to north track. Geraldine Neale died in 1970 and was the daughter of John Wilkin who was miller at the time the towermill was dismantled in 1902. Her article "The Miller's Daughter" was published in the Eastern Daily Press on 21 August 1948.

== The Mileham Dish ==
The Mileham Dish dates from 4th century AD from a period of time when Britain was under Roman rule. The square silver dish was found in 1839. Though it is tempting to assume that it was part of a hoard of silver, there is no record of it being found with any other objects. It is now held by the British Museum.

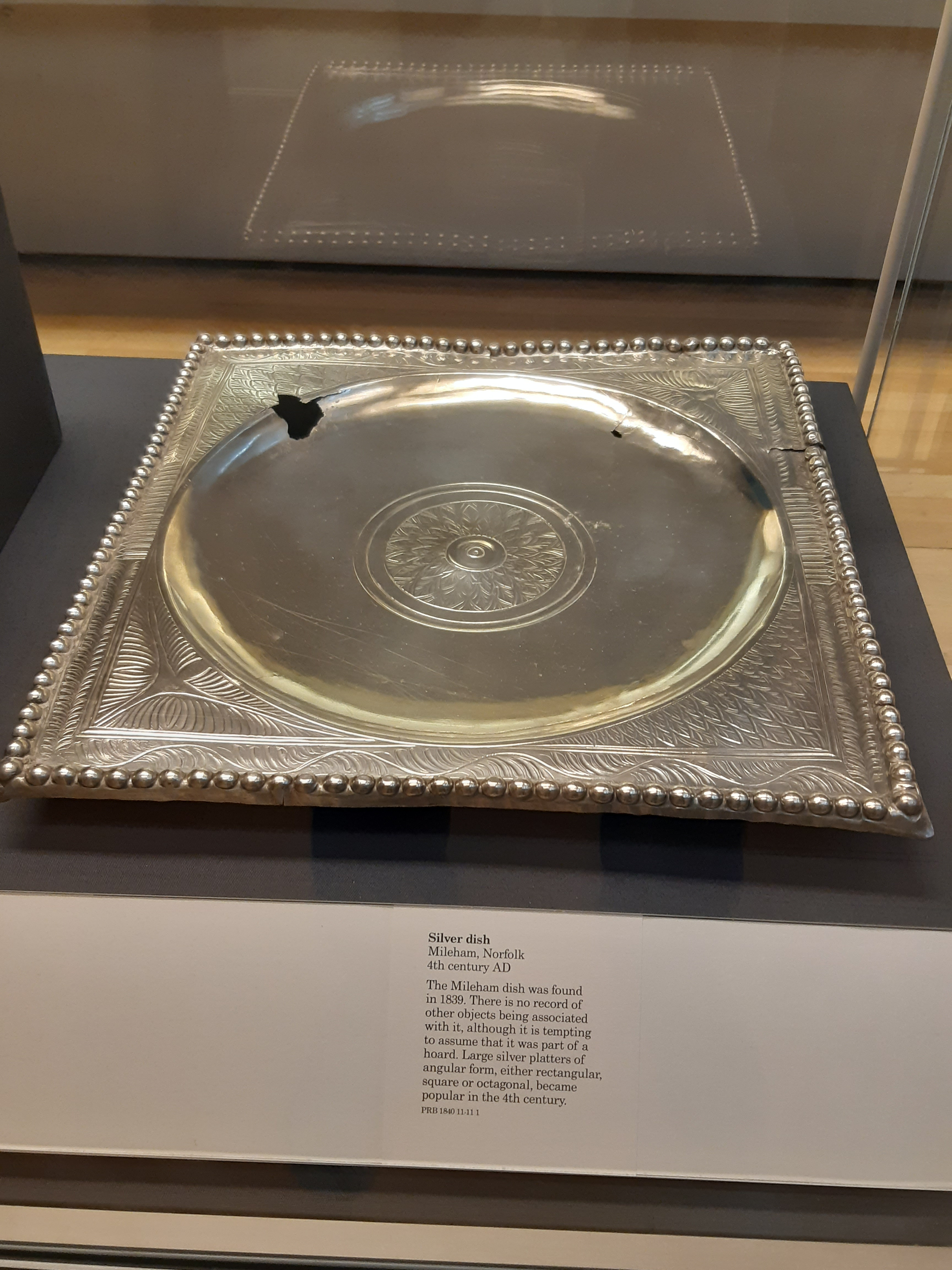
Mileham Dish in the British Museum

== Notable residents ==
Edward Coke (pronounced Cook) was born at Mileham Hall (now demolished), on 1 February 1552. He became Speaker of The House of Commons in 1593 and Attorney General in 1596. He died on 3 September 1634.

== Local institutions and points of interest ==
The village has a post office/general store, and a village hall. Also it had a primary school founded in 1677, but it was closed in 2015. The Royal Oak public house stood in the village centre up until 1983, but has since been converted into a private residence. The Castle public house closed in 1920 and is now Castle Cottages, and the Unicorn Inn closed in 1963 and is also a private residence. The location of The Three Horse Shoes is unknown. Nearby is the source (hence High Norfolk) of the rivers Nar and Wensum. The Nar Valley Way footpath passes through the village. The remains of the medieval village of Grenstein were discovered in the 1960s under agricultural land north of Back Lane.

== See also ==
- HMS Mileham, a Ham class minesweeper
