= B1145 road =

Road in England

B1145
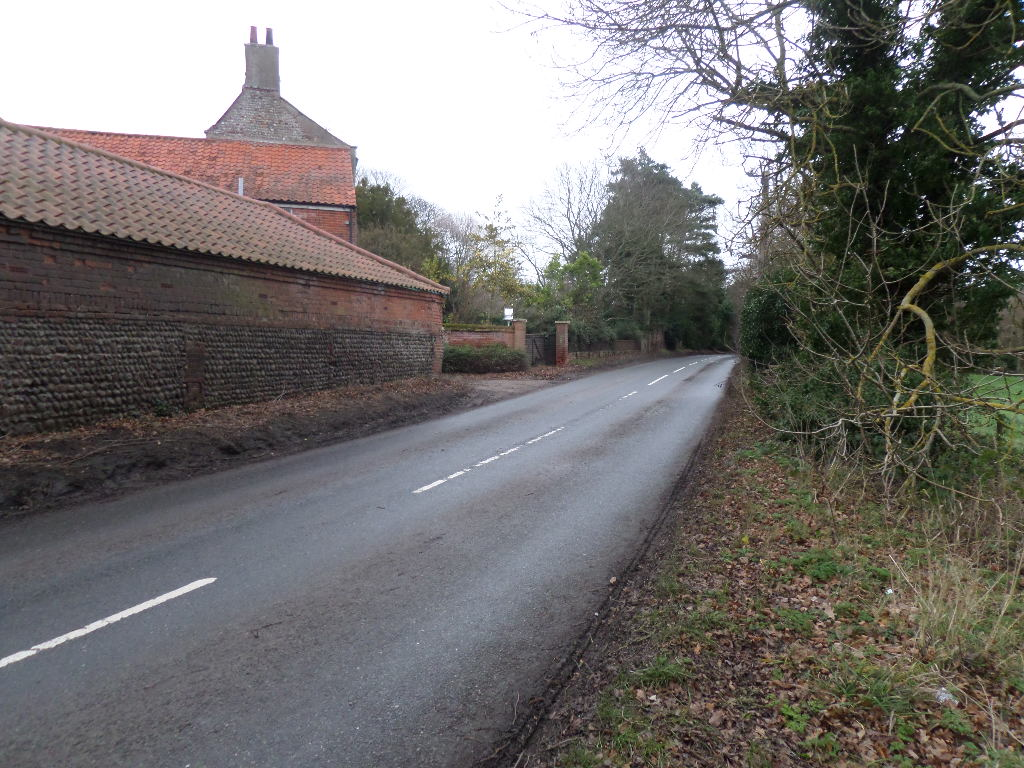
- B1145 between Swafield and Knapton

Route information
- Length: 52.2 mi (84.0 km)

Major junctions
- West-south-west end: King's Lynn; 52.7541°N 0.4485°E
- A149; B1153; A1065; B1146; B1110; A1067; B1149; A140; A149; B1159
- East-north-east end: Mundesley; 52.8788°N 1.4354°E

Location
- Country: United Kingdom

Road network
- Roads in the United Kingdom; Motorways; A and B road zones

The B1145 runs for about 52 miles (84 km) through the county of Norfolk, England, between King's Lynn and Mundesley. The road is an alternative route to the A47 between King's Lynn and Norwich by way of the A1067 from Bawdeswell onwards.

== History ==
This ancient route predates the Norman Conquest and remained the main east–west route through the county until the 17th century. It can be seen quite clearly on William Faden's map of Norfolk, which was surveyed between 1790 and 1794. This map, the first large-scale map (at one inch to the mile) of the whole county, is a record of the landscape and transport system of the county of Norfolk in late 18th century and shows that despite the parliamentary enclosure of the early 19th century the route has changed very little. Much of the route on the map is highlighted in a pale pink, which marks it out as an important artery of the time.

Part of the roads route lies directly on the line of a Roman road between a point 0.8 miles (1.3 km) west of North Elmham for the distance of 4.8 miles (7.7 km) to where the road reaches the village of Bawdeswell. The route is dissected by several Roman roads, including the Peddars Way in the North West of Norfolk.

Road schemes at Bawdeswell, Aylsham and North Walsham have created interruptions to the original route, although the vast majority of it remains intact.

== Coaching route ==
The B1145 also was part of the King's Lynn–to–Great Yarmouth coaching route. On the route at Litcham stands The Bull Inn, a 17th-century coaching inn of which some parts date further back to the 14th century. The Bull provided the first change of horses on this coaching route out of King's Lynn.

== Destinations ==
From west to east the road passes through:

- Bawsey
- Ashwicken
- Gayton
- Litcham
- Mileham
- Brisley
- North Elmham
- Billingford
- Bawdeswell
- Pettywell
- Reepham
- Cawston
- Aylsham
- Felmingham
- North Walsham
- Swafield
- Knapton
- Mundesley
