= Carl Rogers (cricketer) =

English cricketer

Personal information
- Full name: Carl John Rogers
- Born: 20 October 1970 (age 56); Norwich, Norfolk, England
- Batting: Right-handed
- Bowling: Right-arm off-break

Domestic team information
- Years: Team
- 1990–2012: Norfolk

Career statistics
Competition	List A
Matches	22
Runs scored	524
Batting average	26.20
100s/50s	1/2
Top score	139*
Balls bowled	192
Wickets	6
Bowling average	28.50
5 wickets in innings	–
10 wickets in match	–
Best bowling	3/26
Catches/stumpings	10/–
- Source: Cricinfo, 16 June 2022

Carl John Rogers (born 20 October 1970 in Norwich) is an English cricketer who has represented Norfolk since 1990. He is a right-hand batsman who has appeared in 22 List A matches, 17 of these with Norfolk, scoring 524 runs at an average of 26.20 and with a best score of 139 not out coming against the Netherlands in 2001. He also bowls right-arm off-breaks.

Rogers was captain of Norfolk in 2009 and 2010.

Rogers played second XI cricket for Derbyshire, Essex and Sussex but has never played first-class cricket. In the Minor Counties Championship he has played 134 matches, scoring 8661 runs at 38.40 including 17 centuries.

Rogers was born in Norwich and attended Reepham High School. He is married and has two children.
