= George Goodwin Kilburne =

British artist (1839–1924)

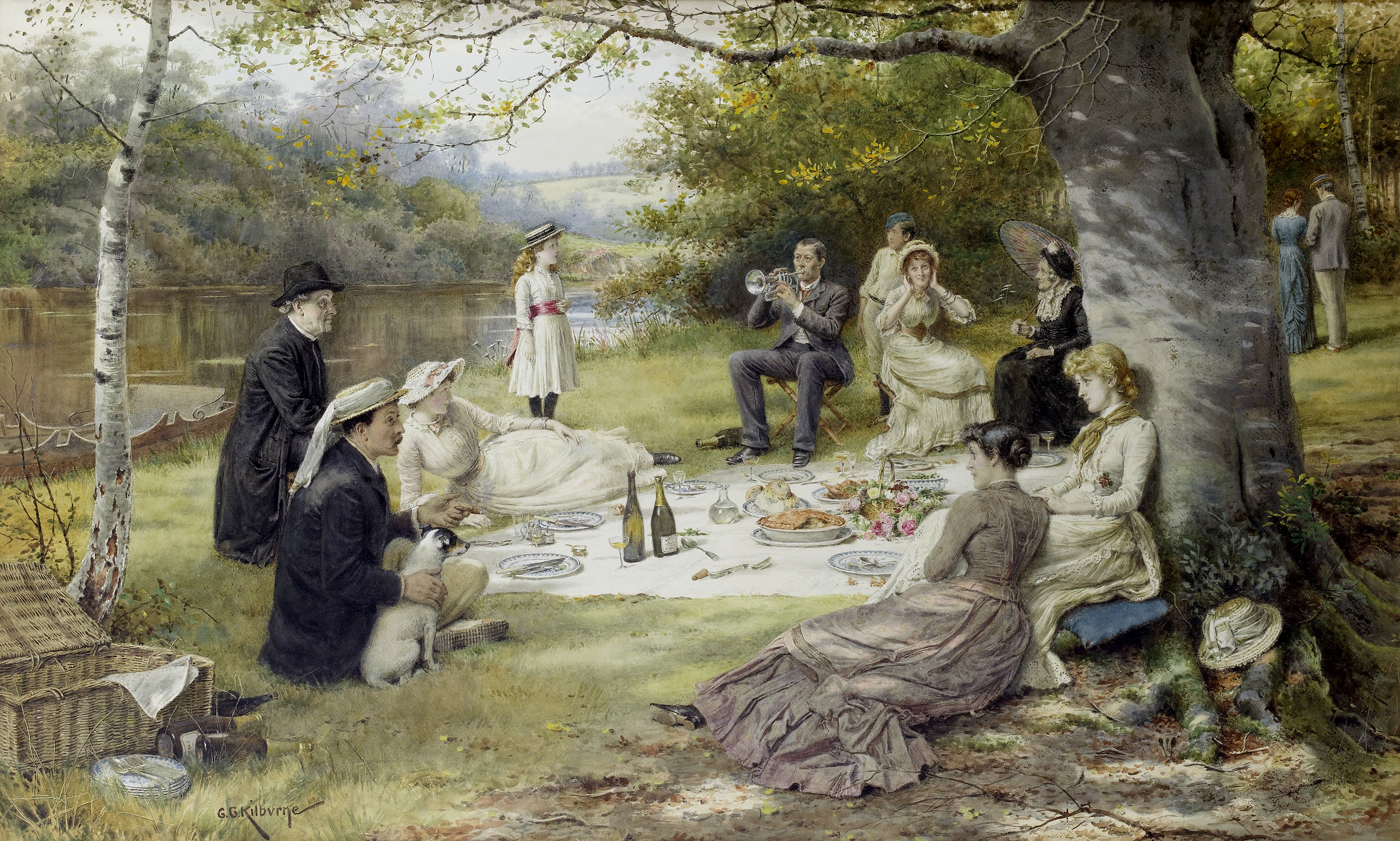
George Goodwin Kilburne, The Picnic, c. 1900

George Goodwin Kilburne, R.I., R.O.I, R.M.S, (24 July 1839 – 1924 London) was an English genre painter specialising in accurately drawn interiors with figures. He favoured the watercolour medium, although he also worked in oils, pencil and initially trained as a wood-engraver.

== Life ==
Kilburne was born at Hackford near Reepham in Norfolk, the eldest of the three children of Goodwin Kilburne (1812–1887) and Rebecca Button (1801–1880).

Kilburne was educated at Hawkhurst, Kent, his father's old school. On leaving at the age of 15, he went to London to serve a five-year apprenticeship as a wood-engraver with the Dalziel brothers. He was highly regarded by his employers, who described him as "industrious and constant" and "one of the most satisfactory pupils we ever had." His time as an engraver served him well, allowing him to develop the accuracy and detail which would enhance his subsequent painting. He remained with the firm for a further year before leaving to take up watercolour and oil painting professionally, quickly becoming one of the most sought after and well-known artists in England.

In June 1862, Kilburne married Janet Dalziel at Old Church, St. Pancras, London. She was the daughter of the painter Robert Dalziel, the brother of his former employers. They had three sons and two daughters – of these his eldest son, George Goodwin Kilburne Jnr., became a very well known painter of animals and figures, principally of sporting subjects. In 1881 the family were recorded as living in Hampstead, London. Janet died in 1882. In 1889 Kilburne married Edith Golightly (34 years his junior), with whom he had a further two children – Edith May (born 1900) and Constance Ivy (born 1902).

Kilburne was a keen sportsman and equestrian and involved himself in hunting, cycling and golf. He possessed a good collection of arms and armour, mainly swords, which often figured in his pictures. He was said to be very quiet and almost retiring in manner, yet very companionable and a friendly and a genial host.

He lived for many years at Hawkhurst House, 39 Steeles Road, Haverstock Hill, Hampstead in London and was a member of the Artists' Society Club at Langham Chambers. At the time of his death, in 1924, he was living at 16 Albion Road, Swiss Cottage, London, but died at his daughter Florence's home, next door to his old house, 38 Steeles Road, Haverstock Hill, Hampstead, London.

He died on 21 June 1924, aged 84, and was buried in the Kilburne family grave on the eastern side of Highgate Cemetery.

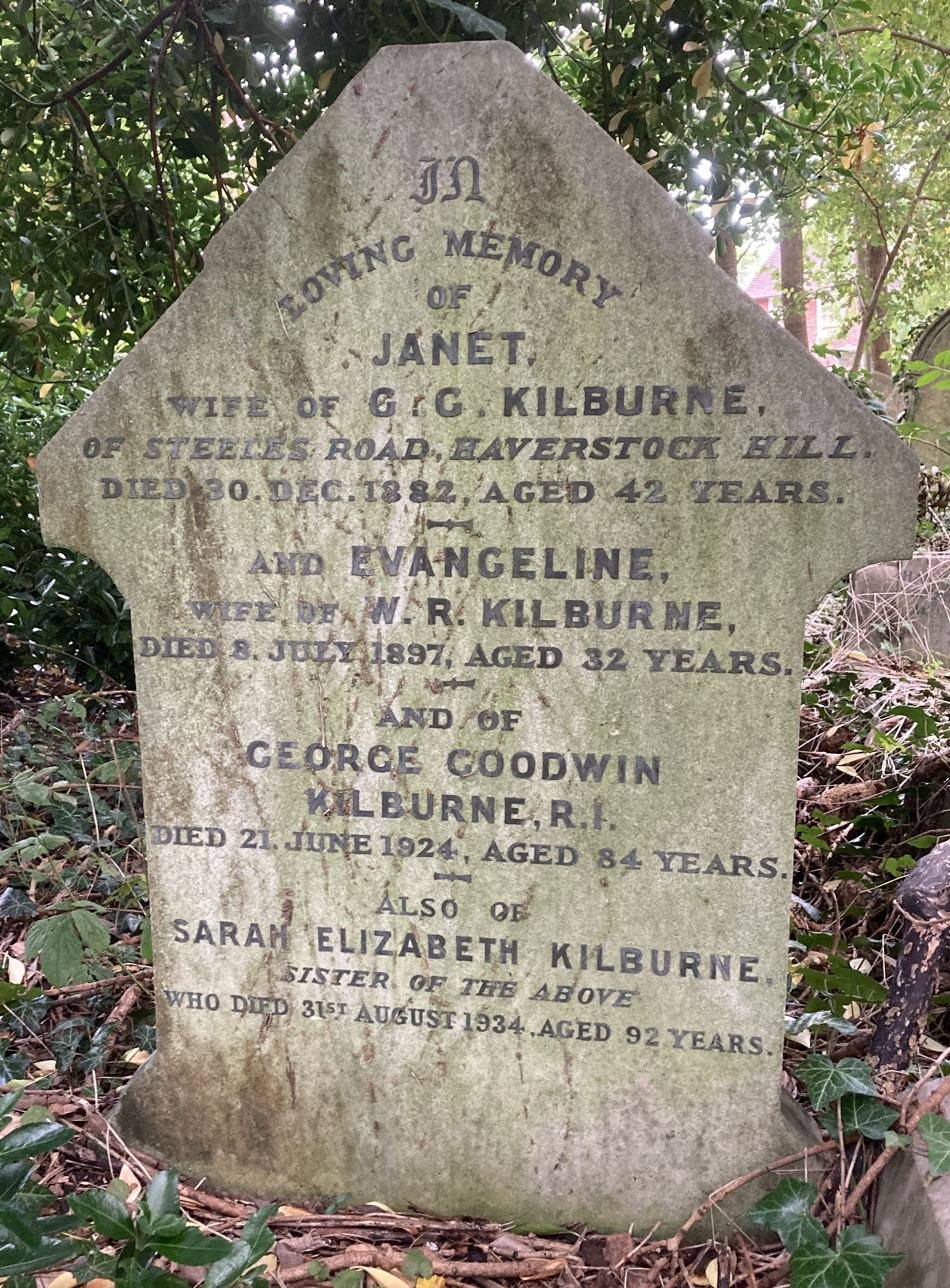
Family grave of George Goodwin Kilburne in Highgate Cemetery

== Work ==
George's paintings often portrayed the upper classes and ultra-fashionable female beauties in opulent late 18th- and early 19th-century settings. His depiction of this beauty was heightened by his attention to detail with dress, and richly decorated interiors. During that period his paintings would have been considered traditional, especially compared to the work of contemporaries such as James McNeill Whistler and the Pre-Raphaelite Brotherhood.

Kilburne travelled extensively in Italy around 1875, and painted in Rome for three months, besides working in Venice at that time, and also in 1876. He did a great deal of sketching in Normandy and Switzerland, besides visiting many parts of England and Wales for the same purpose.

Shortly after the death of the Emperor Napoleon III, the Empress Eugenie commissioned Kilburne to paint several pictures for her. For that purpose he paid many visits to her at Chislehurst, Kent, to paint pictures of the rooms used by the late Emperor, which had been kept just as they were during his lifetime.

Towards the end of the 19th century, Kilburne designed and executed a great number of greeting and Christmas cards for the firms of Raphael Tuck & Sons and De La Rue. The minute work and labour involved brought on a serious attack of gout in the eyes. He also contributed a large number of black-and-white pictures to The Graphic, The Illustrated London News and Cassell's Magazine, and many of his pictures became popular through prints.

Kilburne was elected a member of the New Watercolour Society (RI) in 1866. He became a member of the Royal Miniature Society in 1898 and the Royal Institute of Oil Painters (ROI) in 1883. In London, Kilburne exhibited at the Royal Academy between 1863 and 1918, at the Royal Society of British Artists (Suffolk Street), New Watercolour Society, Royal Miniature Society, Grosvenor Gallery, Dowdeswell Galleries and others. In the regions he exhibited at Royal Birmingham Society of Artists, the Manchester City Art Gallery, the Royal Glasgow Institute of the Fine Arts and the Walker Art Gallery in Liverpool.

Kilburne's work can be seen in many public and private galleries, including the Walker Art Gallery in Liverpool, Manchester City Art Gallery and the Sheffield Art Gallery.

== Gallery ==
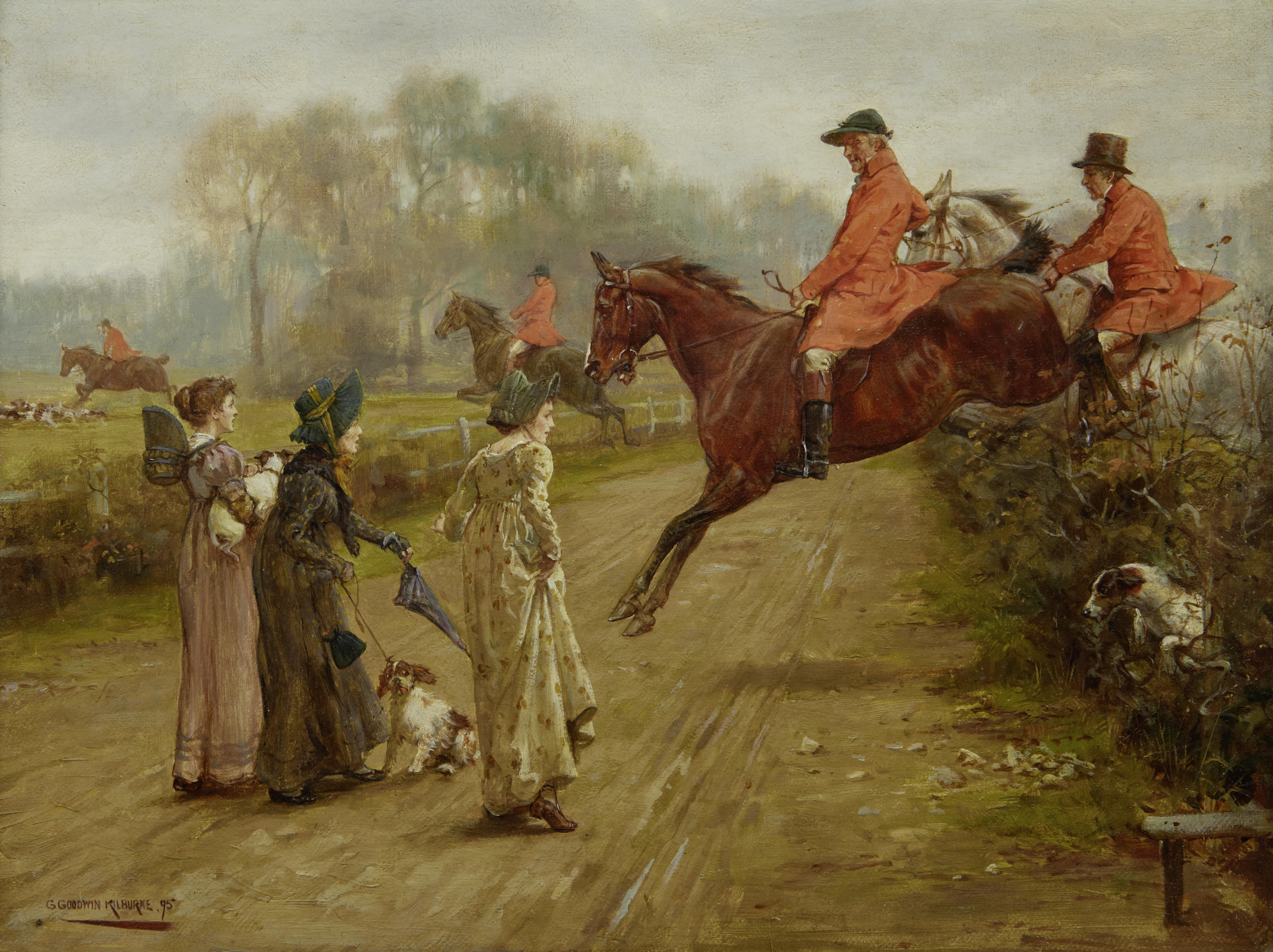
Watching the Hunt, 1895

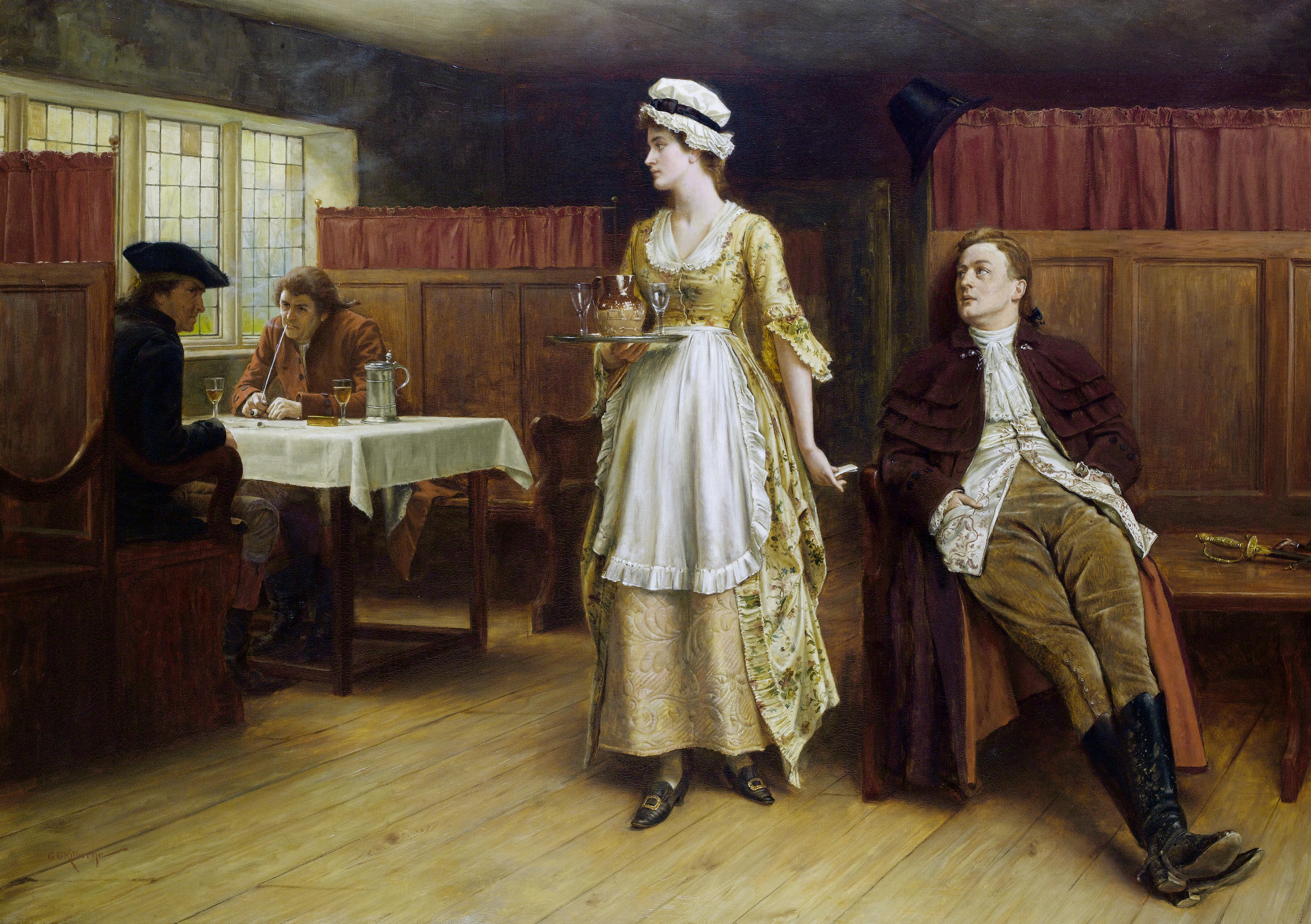
Forewarned is Forearmed

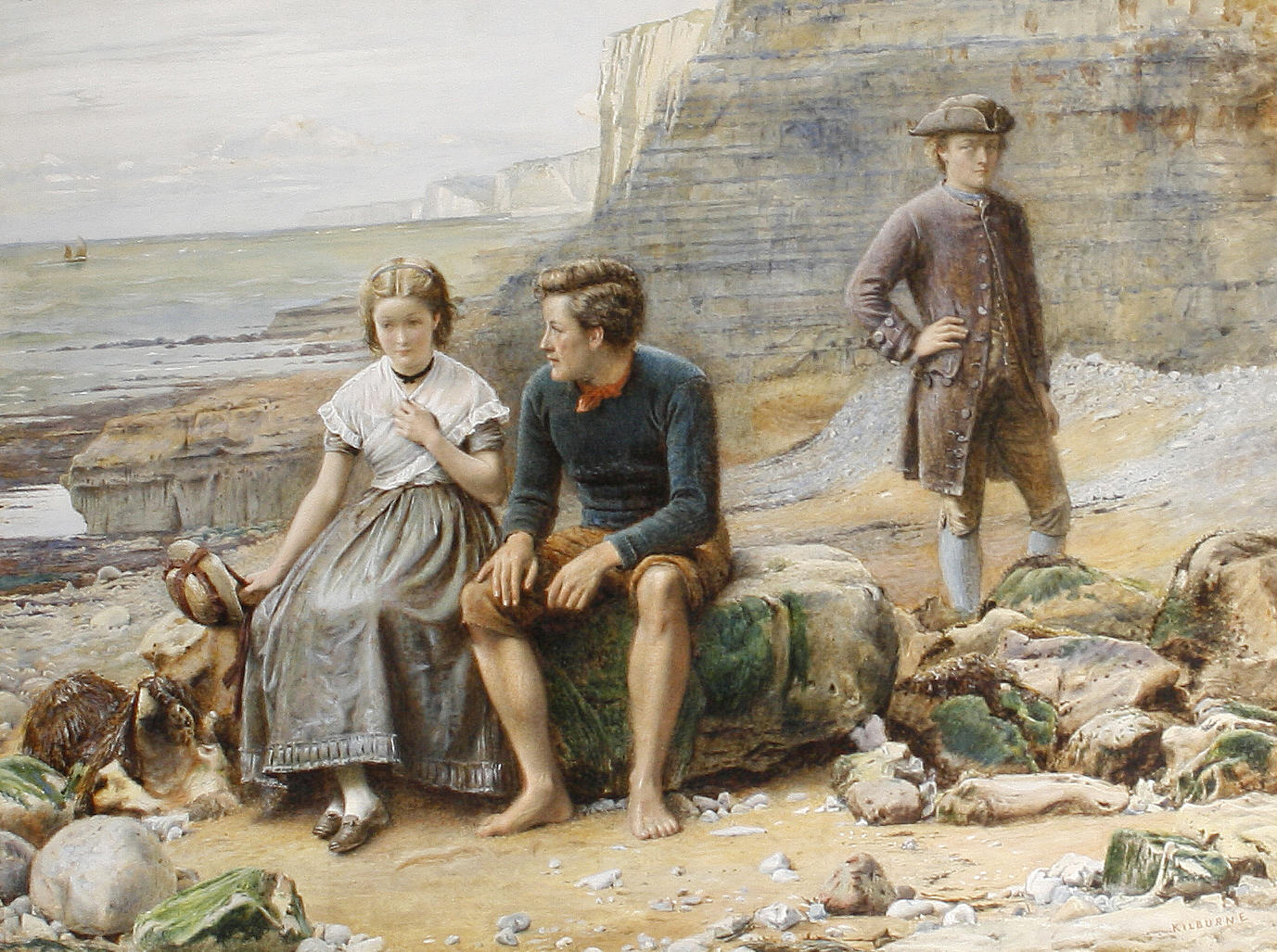
Enoch Arden, watercolour

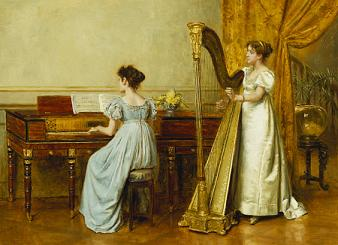
The Music Room

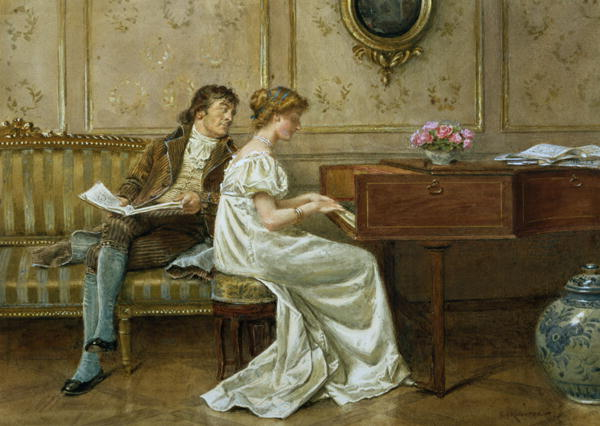
The New Spinet

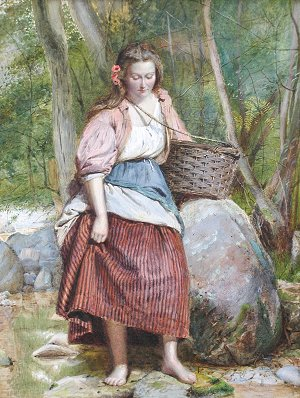
Maiden Meditation, 1866, watercolour

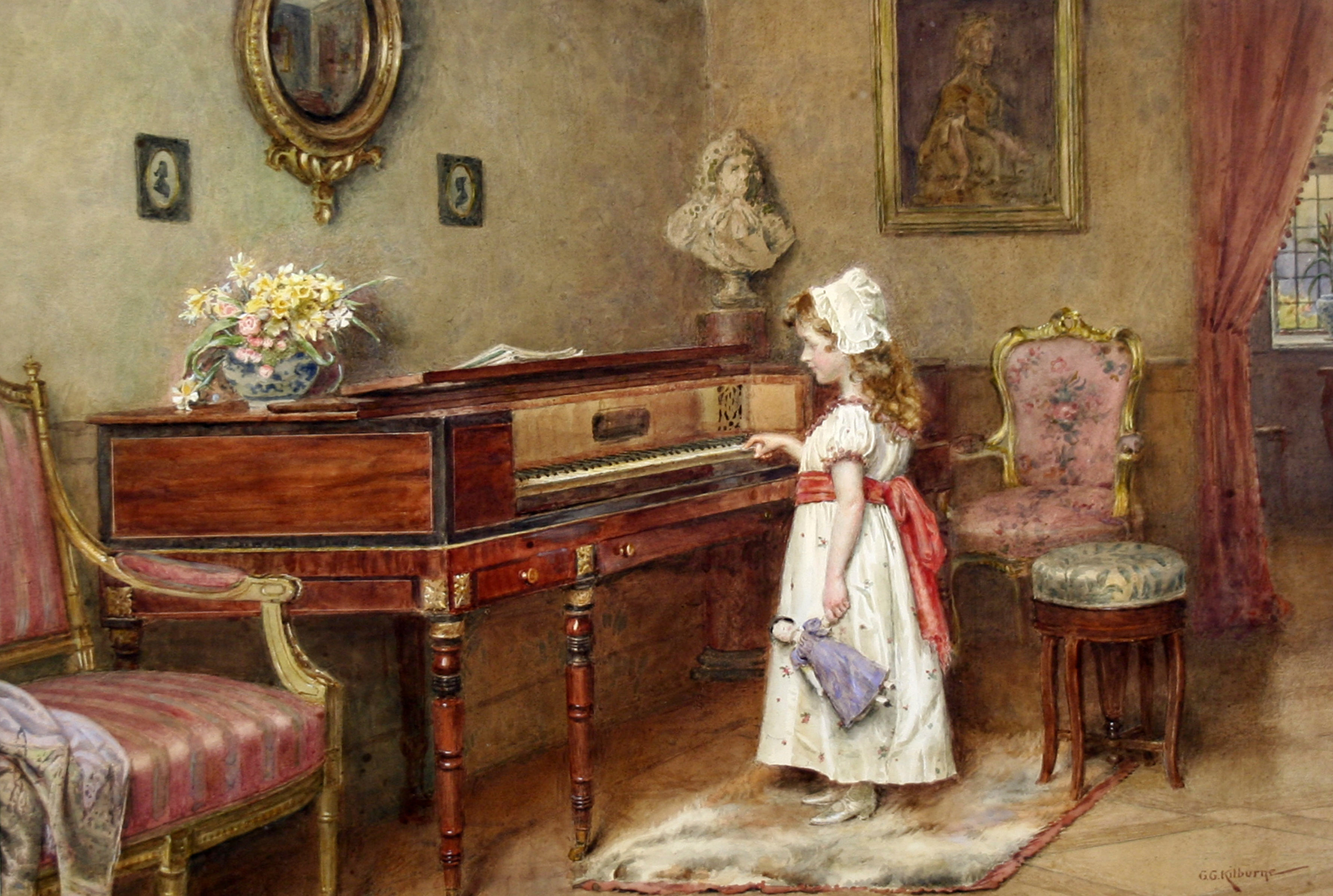
Piano practice, by 1924
