= Litcham School =

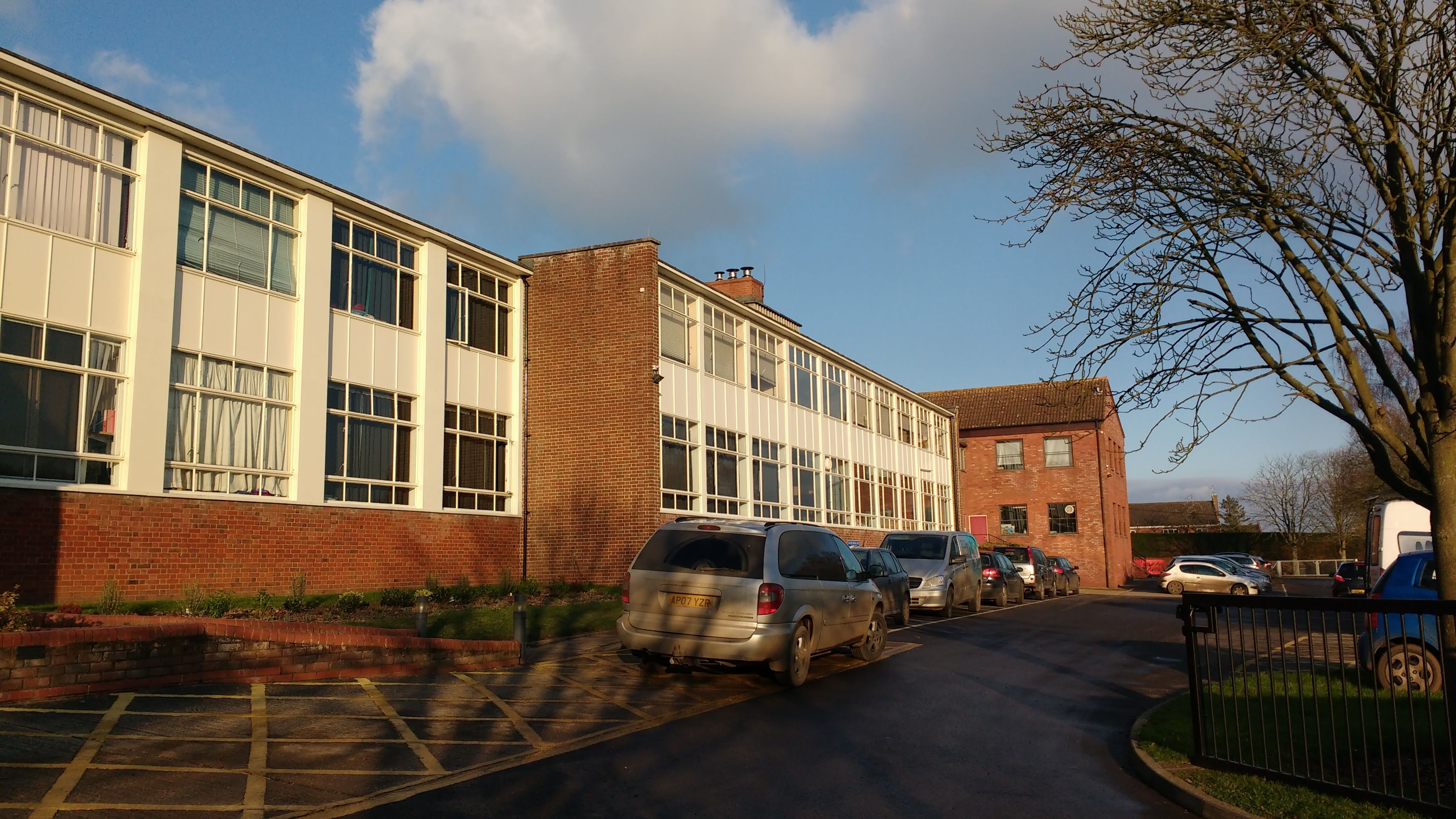

Location
- Church Street; Litcham, Norfolk, PE32 2NS; England; 52°43′23″N 0°47′35″E

Information
- Type: Academy
- Local authority: Norfolk
- Department for Education URN: 146237 Tables
- Ofsted: Reports
- Headteacher: Ben Phillips
- Staff: 120
- Gender: Mixed
- Age: 4 to 16
- Enrolment: 640
- Houses: 4
- Colours: Maroon, Emerald and Blue
- Website: www.litchamschool.org.uk

Litcham School is a mixed all-through school located in the village of Litcham in the English county of Norfolk. It has around 640 pupils aged 4–16 (Years R-11), and the current headteacher is Ben Phillips.

Litcham School is coeducational and pupils are admitted without regard to ability.

In September 2012 the school governing bodies of Litcham High School and Litcham Primary School merged, creating a school catering for pupils from ages 4 to 16. Operationally the two schools maintain their current primary and secondary structure on their existing sites.

Litcham is part of the Synergy Multi-academy Trust, which is centred on Reepham High School.
