= HMS Mileham =

Minesweeper of the Royal Navy

History

United Kingdom
- Name: HMS Mileham
- Namesake: Mileham
- Builder: William Weatherhead & Sons, Cockenzie
- Launched: 1 July 1954
- Completed: 16 March 1955
- Fate: transferred to France, 1955

France
- Name: Hortensia
- Acquired: 1955
- Stricken: 1983

General characteristics
- Class & type: Ham-class minesweeper
- Displacement: 120 tons standard; 164 tons full
- Length: 106 ft 6 in (32.46 m)
- Beam: 22 ft (6.7 m)
- Draught: 5 ft 9 in (1.75 m)
- Propulsion: 2 shaft Paxman 12YHAXM diesels, 1,100 bhp (820 kW)
- Speed: 14 knots (26 km/h)
- Complement: 2 officers, 13 ratings
- Armament: 1 × Bofors 40 mm L/60 gun / 20 mm Oerlikon gun
- Notes: Pennant number(s): M2711 / IMS48

HMS Mileham was a Ham-class minesweeper of the Royal Navy.

Their names were all chosen from villages ending in -ham. The minesweeper was named after Mileham in Norfolk.
