= Robert Walter Steel =

British geographer

Robert Walter Steel CBE (31 July 1915 – 29 December 1997) was a British geographer, who was professor of geography at Liverpool University from 1957 to 1974 and principal of the University College of Swansea from 1974 to 1982.

== Life ==
He was born in Reading, United Kingdom. Son of Rev Frederick Grabham and Winifred Barry (Harrison) Steel. He was the eldest of four children.

Steel was educated at Great Yarmouth Grammar School and the Cambridge and County High School for Boys. He then attended Jesus College, Oxford, matriculating in 1934, obtaining a first-class degree in 1937.

He was a lecturer in Geography at the University of Oxford from 1939 to 1956, serving in the Naval Intelligence Division of the Admiralty from 1940 to 1945. He was associated with two Oxford colleges: firstly at St Peter's Hall as a lecturer from 1951 to 1956 and then Jesus College as a Fellow from 1954 to 1956. He was then appointed John Rankin Professor of Geography at Liverpool University in 1957 and held this post until 1974. He thereafter became Principal of the University College of Swansea (1974–1982) and also served as Vice-Chancellor of the University of Wales from 1979 to 1981. He was appointed an Honorary Fellow of Jesus College in 1982 and appointed CBE in 1983.
