= Hethersett Academy =

Location
- Queen's Road; Hethersett; Norwich, Norfolk, NR9 3DB; England
- Coordinates: 52°35′58″N 1°11′00″E

Information
- Type: Academy
- Trust: Inspiration Trust
- Department for Education URN: 140188 Tables
- Ofsted: Reports
- Principal: Jane Diver
- Staff: 105 (approx)
- Gender: Coeducational
- Age: 11 to 16
- Enrollment: 1200
- Capacity: 1500
- Houses: Edwards Jordan Dannatt Perkins
- Colours: Red, Black, White
- Website: https://www.hethersettacademy.org/

Hethersett Academy, previously known as Hethersett High School and Science College, is a coeducational secondary school, part of the Inspiration Trust, located in the village of Hethersett in the English county of Norfolk. It has around 1,200 pupils aged 11–16.

== Description ==
In March 2013 Hethersett High School and Science College had been put in special measures. It was one of 28 Norfolk schools targeted by Ofsted in a bid to discover why so many were failing to deliver good outcomes for their pupils.

The visiting inspectors said "Students' achievement was not good enough, leaders and management had failed to spot youngsters' underachievement quickly enough and the quality of teaching was inconsistent and often did not challenge pupils enough. The decline in the quality of education provided by the school indicates that capacity for improvement is inadequate." It acknowledged that students were well cared for and felt safe at school and attendance was above average. Parents were positive about the school's work.

The school re-opened as an academy in November 2013 under the sponsorship of the Inspiration Trust; the new principal was Gareth Stevens.

On 2 December 2014 there were still concerns about the behaviour of the pupils, and Ofsted did a monitoring visit. They advised management to put more emphasis on low-level disruption in lessons being covered by temporary supply staff, praised them for the new system of compulsory after school sessions- saying these worked when they had been well planned and fostered discontent when they were unstructured.

When it visited in 2016, Ofsted found that Hethersett Academy was an 'Outstanding' 11-16 secondary school. Most pupils are White British, with a smaller than average proportion coming from minority ethnic backgrounds. A smaller than average proportion of pupils speak English as an additional language, or are in care or receiving free school meals.
