= Cromer Academy =

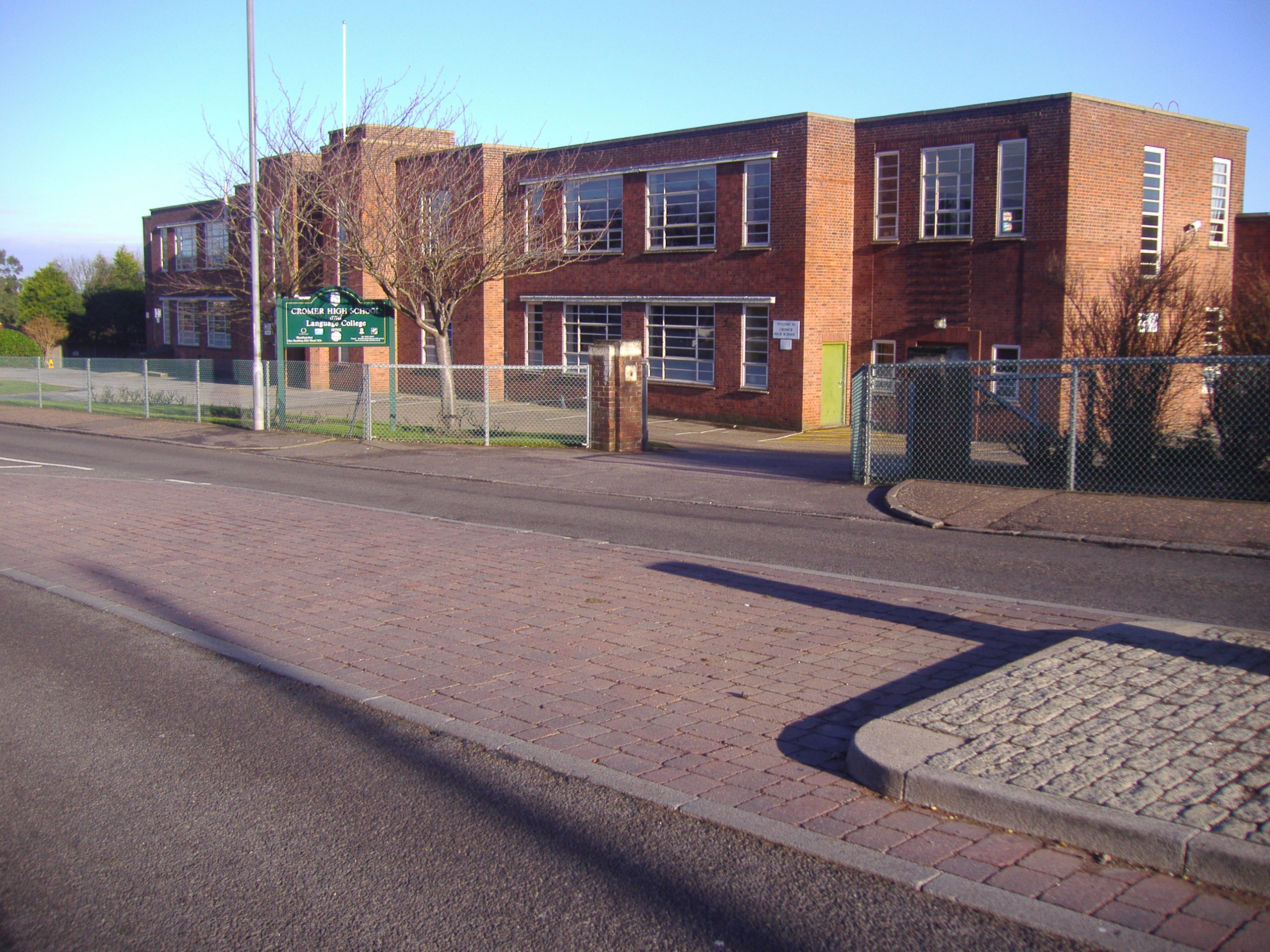

Location
- Norwich Road; Cromer, Norfolk, NR27 53X; England
- Coordinates: 52.9231°N 1.3039°E

Information
- Type: Academy
- Motto: Exceptional, with exception
- Established: 1949; 77 years ago
- Trust: Inspiration Trust
- Department for Education URN: 137431 Tables
- Ofsted: Reports
- Chair of Governors: Tim O’Shea
- Principal: John Vincent
- Gender: Coeducational
- Age: 11 to 16
- Enrolment: 581 pupils
- Houses: Blogg; Sadler; Shipp; Davies
- Website: cromeracademy.org.uk

Cromer Academy (formerly Cromer High School, Sports College, Cromer Institute of Science, Cromer Language College) is an 11-16 secondary school with academy status in Cromer, Norfolk. It is part of the Inspiration Trust federation.

== Description ==
The school is coeducational and students are admitted without regard to ability. It is part of a partnership of schools known as the Cromer Campus, with the neighbouring Suffield Park Infants and Cromer Junior School.

In December 2016, the school was rated "good" by Ofsted. They found a smaller than average comprehensive school, with just 495 students who are mainly white British, with a below average number from minority ethnic groups and similarly a lower than average number of students with Special Educational Needs.

On 2 March 2018, Geoff Baker replaced Penny Bignell as the school's principal. The Eastern Daily Press reported upon Dr Baker's departure that Ofstead assessed he provided "inspirational leadership" and contributed highlights such as "Les Day" in which a day was held in honour of caretaker Les Sadler after he was given a community award. On 1 June 2020, Darren Hollingsworth replaced Stewart Little as the school's principal.

== Curriculum and enrichment ==
Virtually all maintained schools and academies follow the National Curriculum, and are inspected by Ofsted on how well they succeed in delivering a 'broad and balanced curriculum'. The school has to decide whether Key Stage 3 contains years 7, 8 and 9- or whether and year 9 should be in Key Stage 4 so the students will just study their chosen GCSE exam subjects for the final three years. Cromer has selected the three year Key Stage 3 so in Years 7-9 all students study the core curriculum of math, English, and science, with art, computer science, design technology, drama, geography, history, the modern language (French or Spanish, music, philosophy, and physical education). There are sessions covering personal, social, and health issues.

Ofsted judged the school to have 'outstanding management' and commented on the school's efforts to stretch the more able and support the weak. Bullying was non-existent and pupils felt safe and cared for.

In Key Stage 4 students still do the 30-period week, and lessons are still 55 minutes long, but there is an element of choice. Half the week is spent studying the core subjects of mathematics, double English and science with a compulsory language, and a compulsory Humanity in addition. These are the subjects demanded to achieve the English Baccalaureate. They can choose two optional subjects from art, performing arts, music, design technology, computer science, sport, photography, philosophy and not psychology, and Statistics or further sport.

== Free speech controversy ==
In 2023 the Inspiration Trust, the federation to which Cromer Academy belongs, was involved in a widely publicised controversy in which parents of students attending institutions within the federation were asked to sign 'social media contracts' in an attempt to prevent them writing anything on social media that could bring the school into disrepute. This was met with widespread backlash and accusations of 'gagging free speech and criticism'. This series of events followed a rise in social media posts from parents and students voicing numerous concerns ranging from 'lack of support for girls having periods' to 'students sent to isolation with no given reason'. The trust provided no comment in response.
