= Mileham Windmill =

Windmill in Norfolk, England

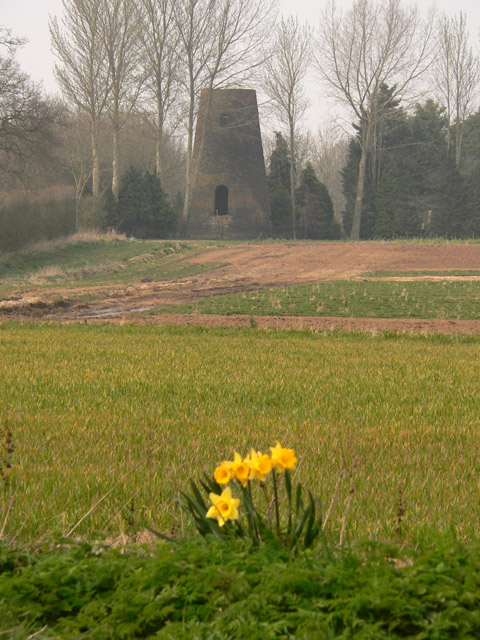
- Mileham Windmill, March 2007
- Interactive map of Mileham Windmill

Origin
- Mill name: Mileham Windmill
- Mill location: Litcham, Norfolk, United Kingdom
- Grid reference: TF9010 1735
- Coordinates: 52°43′14″N 0°48′46″E
- Year built: Mid 19th century

Information
- Purpose: Corn mill
- Type: Tower mill
- Storeys: Four storeys
- No. of sails: Four
- Type of sails: Patent sails
- Windshaft: Cast iron
- Winding: Fantail
- Auxiliary power: Steam engine
- No. of pairs of millstones: Four pairs, later three pairs
- Size of millstones: Two pairs 4 feet 6 inches (1.37 m) diameter, one pair 5 feet 0 inches (1.52 m) diameter

Mileham Windmill is a tower mill in Litcham, Norfolk, United Kingdom. Built in the mid-19th century, it worked until 1918. The mill was dismantled in the mid-1930s. An empty shell stands today.

== History ==
Mileham Windmill stands just across the parish boundary of Mileham and Litcham. A windmill was marked on Ogilvy's 1675 map. A post mill was standing in 1775, then in the occupation of Fuller Pearson. The mill was offered for sale by auction in 1820. It was then in the occupation of William Kendall. It was offered for sale in 1824 and again in 1834, then in the occupation of John Moore.

When the tower mill was built is not known, but one of the millstone bore the legend "T & R Hambling. Dereham", which dates it to c.1845. William Wright was the miller in 1845, followed by George Wright in 1846. Reuben Tilney came to the mill from Yaxham smock mill in 1854. Thomas Smithdale, the Norwich millwright worked on one of the mills in the summer of 1859. He quoted to supply a new cast iron windshaft in 1860 for £16. Tilney had installed a steam engine as auxiliary power in February 1865, the work being done by Smithdale. Both mills were sold in 1877. They were bought by Benjamin Stringer, who offered them for sale in 1881. James Tilney was the miller in 1883, followed by Henry Steggles from 1888 to 1892 and Alfred Tilney in 1896. The post mill was derelict and the tower mill was dilapidated in 1898, when John Wilkin took possession. He repaired the tower mill, which was returned to work in August 1902. The fantail then being painted scarlet and the mill working three pairs of millstones. The mill lost a sail in 1904, which was eventually replaced. It lost a sail in 1918 and was not worked thereafter. The mill was derelict in 1934, only carrying three broken sails. The cap frame only remained and the fantail was missing. The mill had been dismantled by September 1936. The mill was surveyed by Arthur C. Smith on 6 April 1970. He described it as a shell with a few floor beams in place, and a millstone on the floor.

== Description ==
Mileham Windmill is a four-storey tower mill.The tower is about 38 feet 0 inches (11.58 m) tall. It was 24 feet 0 inches (7.32 m) diameter at the base, with walls 21 inches (530 mm) thick. The mill had a boat shape cap. Four double Patent sails carried on a cast iron windshaft. The sails had seven bays of three shutters. The mill was winded by a six-bladed fantail. The upright shaft was a composite one, being part cast iron and part wood. There were originally four pairs of millstones, later three pairs. These were two pairs of 4 feet 6 inches (1.37 m) diameter Peak stones and a pair of 5 feet 0 inches (1.52 m) diameter French Burr stones.
