= Grenstein =

Former village in Norfolk, England

Coordinates: 52.744°N 0.824°E

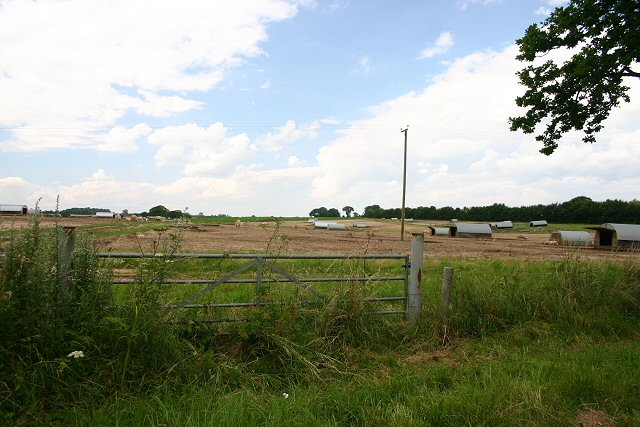
Grenstein Farm near Mileham

Grenstein, also known as Gramston or Greynston, was until approximately the 16th century a village in the English county of Norfolk, between Mileham and Tittleshall. There was a market in the 13th century. Since 1959, the site has become obliterated by farming. A single building from the manor estate, Grenstein Lodge, was all that remained of the settlement in 1883.
