= Walter Roy =

British teacher and educationalist (1925–2012)

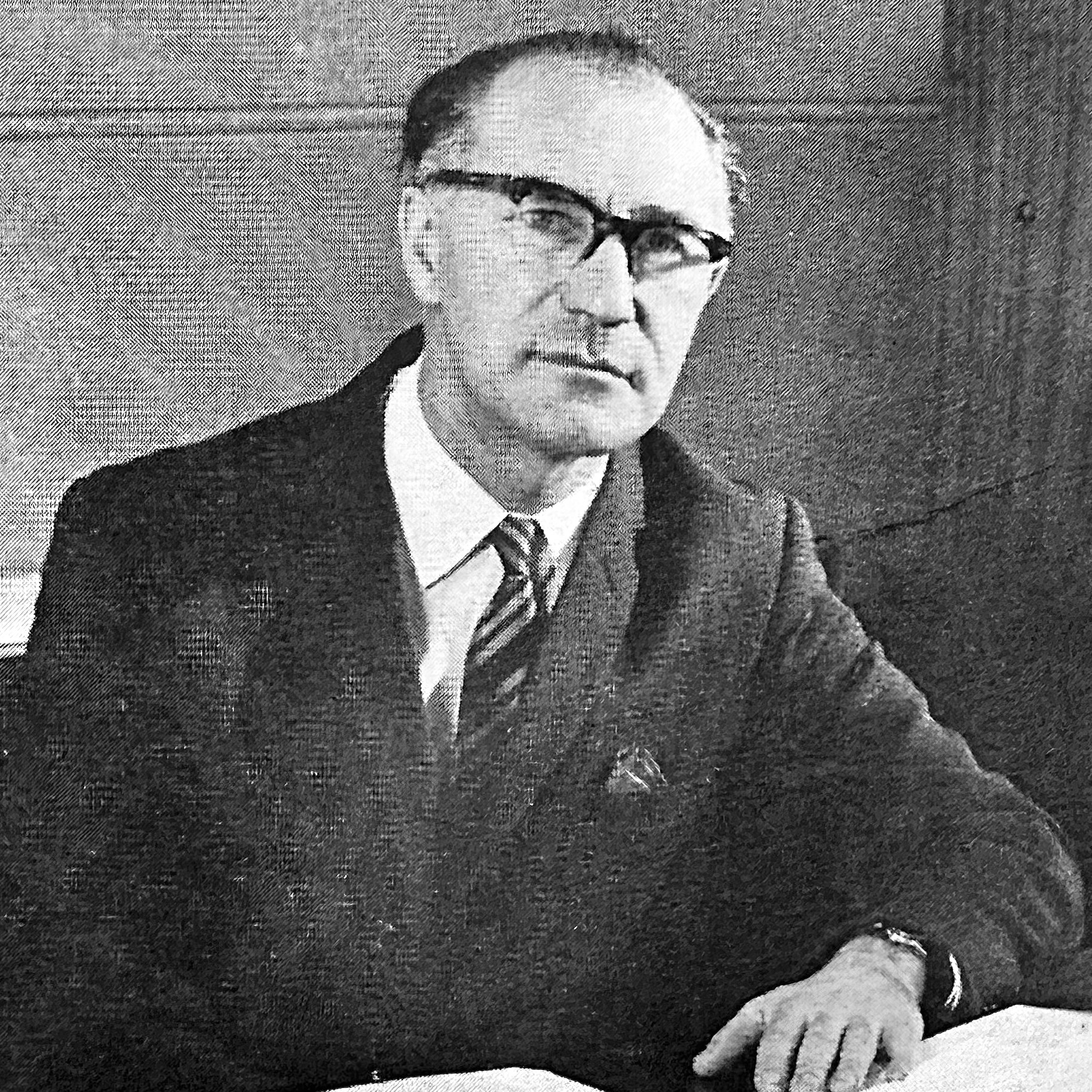
- Roy c.1970
- Born: 11 April 1925; Vienna, Austria
- Died: 4 July 2012 (aged 87); Graz, Austria
- Occupation: Educator

Walter Roy CBE (11 April 1925 – 4 July 2012) was an Austrian‑born British teacher, educationalist and trade unionist, noted for his headship of the Hewett School in Norwich and his advocacy of comprehensive secondary education in England. A refugee from Nazism, he later co‑founded the International Sonnenberg Association and became a prominent figure in international youth and peace education.

== Biography ==
=== Early life and war service ===
Roy was born in Vienna, Austria, on 11 April 1925. After the Nazi annexation of Austria in March 1938 and the application of anti‑Jewish laws, he escaped later that year to Britain and settled with his family in Welwyn, Hertfordshire. As a teenager he worked for Murphy Radio in Welwyn and as a waiter at the Waldorf Hotel in London before joining British military intelligence in 1943, serving in the Netherlands under Nazi occupation and after the D‑Day landings.

=== Teaching career ===
After the Second World War Roy trained as a teacher in Britain and took up his first post in Welwyn, where he met his future wife, Madge. In 1955 he became headteacher of Old Bedford Road School, Luton, and in 1959 was appointed head of Stopsley High School, Luton, where he pioneered non‑selective comprehensive education. He was awarded a PhD from the London School of Economics in 1963 for research on teachers' trade unions.

In 1969 Roy became head of Hewett Grammar School in Norwich with responsibility for merging it with Lakenham Secondary Modern Schools to create the Hewett comprehensive school in 1970. Roy saw the Hewett as an opportunity to create a model comprehensive school, establishing a system which gave pupils the benefits of the wide range of choices and courses which a large school could offer, combined with personal tailoring and pastoral care to meet the disparate needs and interests of each individual. Under his leadership the school grew to around 1,850 pupils and developed a wide curriculum including academic subjects, technical workshops and vocational courses, reflecting the employment needs of Norwich's changing economy. He emphasised the role of pupils as future active citizens. He remained headteacher until his retirement in 1990, during which time the school educated an estimated 7,000 pupils.

=== Educationalist and trade unionist ===
Roy was active in the National Union of Teachers, serving on its Executive and chairing its Education Committee, where he argued for comprehensive schooling and against selection by ability, which he described as "educationally unsound and socially indefensible". He chaired the National Secondary Examinations Council from 1980, contributing to the design and implementation of the General Certificate of Secondary Education (GCSE) to assess pupils across the full ability range. His 1983 book Teaching Under Attack analysed government cuts and centralisation in education and called for stronger teacher professionalism in response.

=== International work ===
In 1958 Roy co‑founded the International Sonnenberg Association, based in Germany, to develop new forms of international understanding and peace education for young people. The association organised cross‑border residential seminars and he served for many years as its president and chair until 1995.

=== Honours and later life ===
Roy was appointed Commander of the Order of the British Empire (CBE) in the 1977 New Year Honours for services to education. Following the death of his first wife he returned to Austria, remarried in Graz, and died there on 4 July 2012 at the age of 87.

== Published works ==
- 1983: Teaching Under Attack, Croom Helm, London
- 1986: The New Examination System - GCSE, Routledge, London

== Awards and recognition ==
- 1963: Awarded PhD from the LSE for research on teachers' trade unions.
- 1968: Elected to Executive Committee, National Union of Teachers
- 1976: Awarded CBE for services to education.
- 1980s: Appointed Chair of the National Secondary Examinations Council, shaping and implementing the new GCSEs to reduce segregation by ability in the exam system.
