= Reepham Town Hall =

Municipal building in Reepham, Norfolk, England

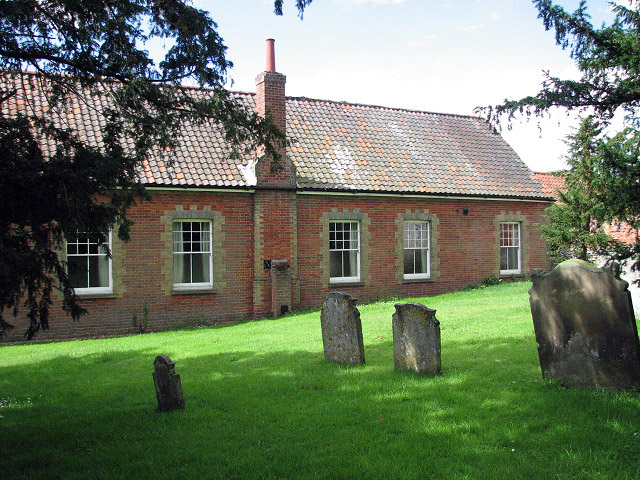
- The building in 2008

- Shown in Norfolk
- 52.7621°N 1.1122°E
- Location: Back Street, Reepham

History
- Built: 1860

Site notes
- Architectural style: Victorian style

Reepham Town Hall is a municipal building in Back Street, Reepham, Norfolk, a town in England. The building, which was originally commissioned as a school, is currently used for as the offices and meeting place of Reepham Town Council.

== History ==
In the mid-19th century, the new Rector of Reepham, Frederick Field, who had been a classical scholar at Trinity College, Cambridge, launched an initiative to commission two schools for the area. The first of these was a school for the village of Reepham itself: the site he selected was on Norwich Road and he financed the school himself. It was designed in the Tudor style, built in red brick with stone dressings and opened as Reepham St Mary's School in 1847.

The second school was for the small surrounding settlements of Hackford (to the west) and Whitwell (to the southwest): the site he selected was in Back Street on land which was already part of the grounds of his church. It was designed in the Victorian style, built in red brick with stone dressings and opened as the Hackford and Whitwell Parochial School in 1860. The design involved a rectangular shaped building which faced north onto the churchyard. There was a doorway in the left-hand bay; the other bays were fenestrated by sash windows with architraves. Internally, the principal rooms were the main assembly hall and a large kitchen.

Following the implementation of the Elementary Education Act 1870 and the formation of Aylsham Rural District Council in 1894, the local education authority decided to establish a board school to be known as Reepham Primary School in what became known as School Road. The two schools, which had been commissioned by Field, were already too small and, being redundant, closed in 1903 and 1901 respectively.

In the early 20th century, the parish council agreed that the former Hackford and Whitwell Parochial School should be converted for community use and was designated Reepham Town Hall. The building was used for a variety of community events including dances in the 1950s. Following local government reorganisation in 1974, Reepham Parish Council was succeeded by Reepham Town Council and the new council used the town hall as its offices and meeting place.

The town hall was used as a civil defence headquarters in the television programme The Tragedy at Marsdon Manor, part of the series, Agatha Christie's Poirot, which was broadcast in February 1991. In 2021, Reepham Nursery School proposed relocating to the building, but this was opposed by several community groups which held activities in the building.
