= Inspiration Trust =

British multi-academy trust

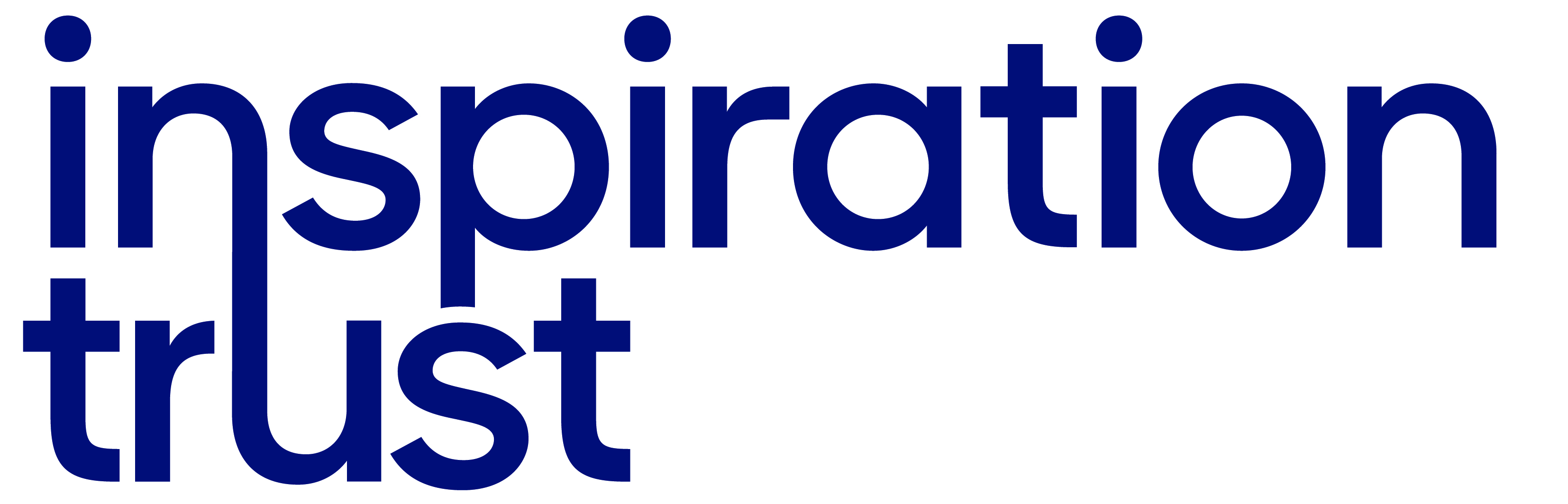
Logo for The Inspiration Trust, Norwich, Norfolk, UK

Inspiration Trust is a multi-academy trust of academies and free schools in East Anglia, England. The trust was founded by Theodore Agnew, Baron Agnew of Oulton as the East Norfolk Academy Trust in 2012, changing its name to the Inspiration Trust in 2013. Although technically a limited company, as a multi-academy trust the company is an exempt charity, principally regulated by the Department for Education.

All the academies on the roster are in Norfolk, except East Point Academy, which is located in Lowestoft, Suffolk.

== Primary schools ==
- Charles Darwin Primary, Norwich - opened September 2016
- Cobholm Primary Academy, Great Yarmouth
- Great Yarmouth Primary Academy
- Norwich Primary Academy
- Stradbroke Primary Academy, Gorleston

== Secondary schools ==
- Cromer Academy
- East Point Academy, Lowestoft
- Great Yarmouth Charter Academy
- Hethersett Academy
- The Hewett Academy, Norwich
- Jane Austen College, Norwich
- Thetford Academy
- Wayland Academy, Thetford

== Sixth forms ==
- Sir Isaac Newton Sixth Form, Norwich

== Controversies ==
In 2014 an investigation took place into whether three of the Inspiration Trust's schools were given unauthorised advance notice of Ofsted inspections. The main finding of the investigation was that there was no evidence the schools had received unauthorised prior warning. There was a secondary finding that the trust's Chief Executive, Dame Rachel de Souza, had mistakenly seen a planned inspection date for one of the schools during her own training as an inspector; however, this date had been changed as a result. There was further concern about Ofsted's judgements of one of the trust's schools in 2018.

In 2015 a local Member of Parliament, Clive Lewis, questioned the Trust's fitness to run schools.

In 2018 there was concern about Sir Theodore's continuing role in the trust given that he had become Academies Minister, although he was no longer "a person of significant control". He resigned from the trust the same year.

In the same year there was criticism of Dame Rachel de Souza's salary.

In 2019 there was publicity about the amount the trust was deducting from schools' budgets to fund development of the curriculum.

In summer 2020, de Souza took a high-profile decision to reopen her schools in mid August in response to the educational time lost due to the COVID-19 pandemic.

“Every hour makes a difference! Particularly in schools with disadvantaged cohorts, that time in front of a teacher is critical.” (de Souza)

Some students have had no contact with the internet for six months, others will have been diligently following online lessons, de Souza explained. Students, starting with year 11s, will self isolate in year group bubbles, in school and on the school buses. They will have longer school days and be offered Saturday school with catch-up sessions.
