= Pettywell =

Hamlet in Norfolk, England

Coordinates: 52.76345°N 1.088848°E

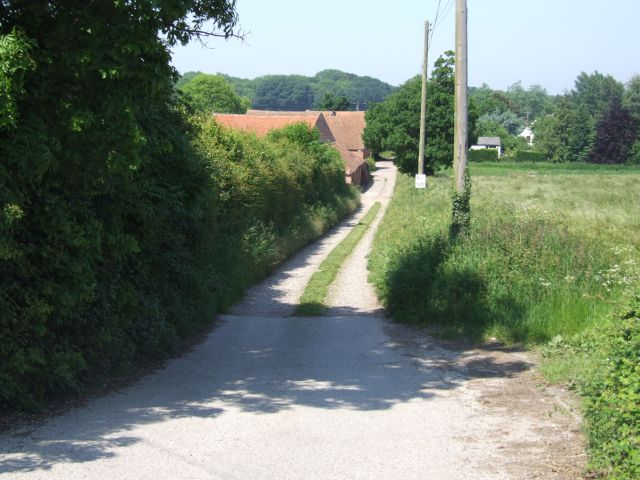
- Track leading to the Hamlet of Pettywell.

- Location within Norfolk
- OS grid reference: TG080230
  - London: 128 miles (206 km)
- Civil parish: Reepham
- District: Broadland
- Shire county: Norfolk
- Region: East
- Country: England
- Sovereign state: United Kingdom
- Post town: NORWICH
- Postcode district: NR10
- Police: Norfolk
- Fire: Norfolk
- Ambulance: East of England
- UK Parliament: North Norfolk

Pettywell is a hamlet within the a civil parish of Reepham in the English county of Norfolk. The hamlet is 8.3 miles (13.4 km) west south west of Aylsham and 14.7 miles (23.7 km) north west of Norwich and 128 miles (206 km) north east of London. The hamlet is on the north side of the B1145 which links King's Lynn and Mundesley. The nearest railway station is at North Walsham for the Bittern Line which runs between Sheringham, Cromer and Norwich.The nearest airport is at Norwich International Airport. For the purposes of local government, the parish of Reepham falls within the district of Broadland.

== Description ==
The hamlet of Pettywell consists of a collection of cottages around the former farmhouse now known as Pettywell Place. Most of the farm buildings have now been converted to residential properties.
