= Reepham, Norfolk =

Town in Norfolk, England

Coordinates: 52.762°N 1.112°E

Reepham
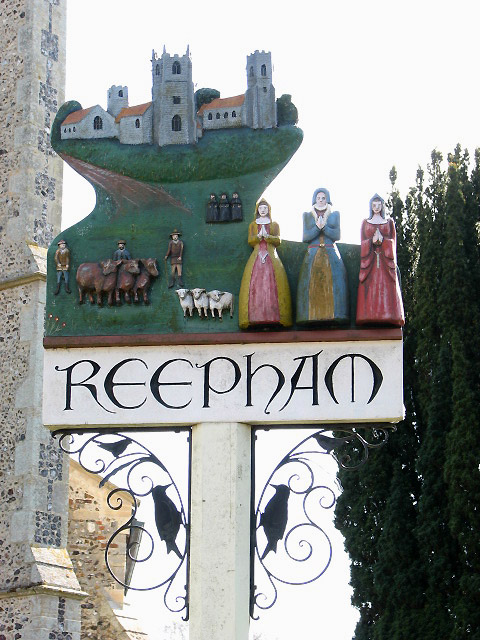
- The town sign, showing sundry triplets

- Location within Norfolk
- Area: 19.09 km^{2} (7.37 sq mi)
- Population: 2,709 (2011 census)
  - Density: 142/km^{2} (370/sq mi)
- OS grid reference: TG100228
  - London: 118 miles (190 km)
- Civil parish: Reepham
- District: Broadland
- Shire county: Norfolk
- Region: East
- Country: England
- Sovereign state: United Kingdom
- Post town: NORWICH
- Postcode district: NR10
- Dialling code: 01603
- Police: Norfolk
- Fire: Norfolk
- Ambulance: East of England
- UK Parliament: Broadland and Fakenham

Reepham (/ˈriːfəm/) is a market town and civil parish in the Broadland district of Norfolk, England. The town is on the B1145 road between the Bure and Wensum valleys, and is 12 miles (19 km) northwest of Norwich. At the time of the 2001 census the civil parish (including Pettywell) had a population of 2,455 residents in 970 households, occupying an area of 1,909 hectares (4,720 acres), increasing to a population of 2,709 in 1,169 households at the 2011 census.

== History ==
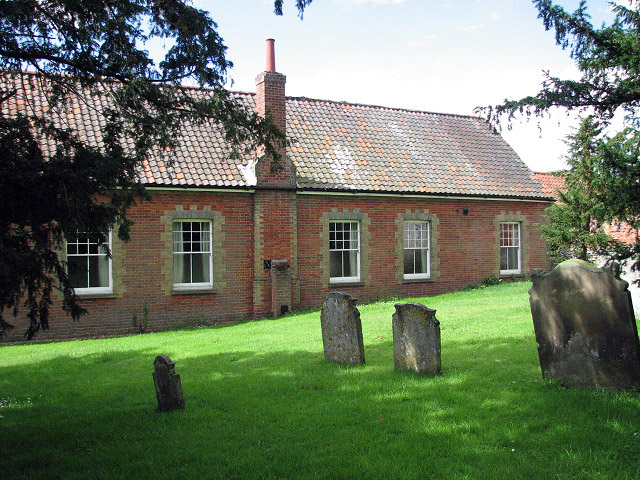
Reepham Town Hall

The town is mentioned in the Domesday Book of 1086, in which it is listed as Refham meaning the bailiff's or reeve's manor from the Old English gerafa (bailiff) and ham (homestead). Reepham has had market town status since 1277; a sign to mark this has recently been erected. The town has undergone significant development throughout its life, with the housing in the area showing a mix of vintages, styles and purposes.

Reepham Town Hall was constructed in 1860, originally as a school.

=== Recent discoveries ===
In June 2021, archaeologists announced the discovery of gold coins thought to have been lost in the Black Death and dated back to the reign of Edward III near Reepham. According to researcher Helen Geake, one of the rare coins was 23 carats and known as a leopard, while other was called a noble. They were equal to £12,000 today and probably would have been owned by high ranked person.

== Today ==
Recent housing developments have mostly been on brownfield land so have not significantly expanded the perimeter of the town.

The town has both a secondary school, Reepham High School and College, which achieved the highest grade – Outstanding – in every category in its 2008 Ofsted inspection, and a primary school.

The Reepham Society is a registered charity, set up in 1976 to stimulate public interest in Reepham, Hackford, Kerdiston, Salle and Whitwell. The town was one of the filming locations of the Agatha Christie's Poirot episode The Tragedy at Marsdon Manor.

== Religion ==
=== Twin churches ===
Reepham is one of only two places in Europe to have had three churches on the same site. Reepham's church of St. Mary is joined by its choir vestry to St. Michael's, Whitwell. The third church, All Saints', belonged to Hackford (not to be confused with the Hackford in South Norfolk) but burned down in 1543, and now only a fragment of its tower wall remains on the left of the path leading towards the market place. The three churches were built on their parish boundaries.

Reepham church contains the fine tomb of Sir Roger de Kerdiston, 1337; Whitwell church has a Jacobean pulpit.

=== Shrine of Our Lady of Reepham ===
In medieval times, Reepham Church was an important place of pilgrimage. Although it was less famous than the shrine at Walsingham, people came on pilgrimage to Reepham to visit the image of Our Lady of Reepham, which had many miracles attributed to it. What form this image took is unknown. It may have been a statue, or perhaps a wood carving. There is evidence to suggest its importance and it is mentioned in the 15th-century will of Alice Cook of Horstead, who wrote that after her death, in order to smooth her passage from this world to the next, she would "Have a man goo a pilgrimage to our Lady of Reifham".

== Town sign ==
The town sign was designed by the local high school and installed in 1992. Carved by the then head of Craft Design & Technology Mr. Geldard, and painted by male student Kerry Daniels, it depicts three of each of the following elements: churches, villagers, farm labourers, sheep, lambs and "sisters" and refers to a myth that three sisters were each responsible for building a church. In fact, the three churches were built over several generations.

== Transport ==
=== Roads ===
The B1145, which connects King's Lynn with Mundesley, runs through the town.

=== Railway ===
Reepham is no longer connected to the National Rail network. The nearest station is in Norwich, 14 miles away.

==== History ====
By 1882, the town had two stations, located on different tracks and each managed by a separate railway company. Whitwell station was on the Midland and Great Northern Joint Railway's Norwich City to Melton Constable branch line. Reepham station was on the GEN's Wroxham to County School station line. In 1960, the tracks were joined by the construction of the Themelthorpe Curve; the work was carried out by British Rail, to facilitate the movement of concrete products from Lenwade.

Today, the railway trackbed forms the Marriott's Way, a long-distance footpath between Norwich and Aylsham; both former stations are notable stops on the path.

=== Buses ===
Sanders Coaches provide bus services to and from the town. The most regular services are on routes 43/A/B to Aylsham and Norwich.

=== Cycling ===
National Cycle Route 1 passes through the town.

== Sport ==
The Reepham and Salle Cricket Club have their home ground in Salle, a village 1.5 miles (2.4 km) to the north of the town.

== Notable residents ==
- George Goodwin Kilburne (1839–1924), artist
- Keith Simpson, former Conservative MP for Broadland
