= Reepham High School and College =

Reepham High School and College (Academy)
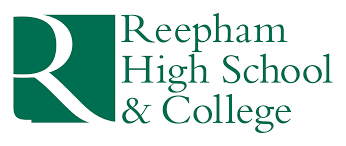

Location
- Whitwell Road; Reepham, Norfolk, NR10 4JT; England; 52.75799°N 1.10744°E

Information
- Type: Academy
- Motto: Comprehensive Excellence
- Religious affiliation: None
- Established: 1961
- Local authority: Norfolk
- Trust: Synergy Multi-Academy Trust
- Specialists: Science, Applied Learning, Mathematics & Computing
- Department for Education URN: 138829 Tables
- Ofsted: Reports
- Principal: Jon Croucher
- College Director: Helen McGuinness
- Years taught: 7-13
- Gender: Coeducational
- Age: 11 to 18
- Enrollment: ~800
- Sixth form students: ~200
- Schedule type: 2 Week Timetable
- Colours: Green, Maroon and White
- Publication: RHSC Review
- Website: https://www.reephamhigh.org.uk/

Reepham High School and College is a secondary school and sixth form with academy status located in Reepham, Norfolk. The majority of the students live in outlying villages. Prior to September 2009, when Reepham College opened, it was known as Reepham High School. Jon Croucher is the current principal, taking over from Tim Gibbs in 2024. The school created and leads the Synergy Multi-Academy Trust.

== History ==
The school opened with around 200 pupils in 1961 as a secondary modern school. The first head was Edward Riddell Smith.

A sixth form was opened next to the school in September 2009 after a £6,000,000 investment. A £280,000 playing field was added in 2010, as well as additional science classrooms.

The high school converted to an academy in October 2012, and in 2014, received an £800,000 grant to replace its 55 year old windows.

In 2015, Reepham High School and College created the Synergy Multi-Academy Trust, made up of academies and schools within 30 minutes of Reepham including Reepham Primary, Bawdeswell Primary, Foulsham Primary, Mattishall Primary, Astley Primary, Corpusty Primary and Litcham School.

A new languages block was finished in September 2016.

In 2017, Mark Farrar stepped down as head teacher, and Tim Gibbs, vice principal and physical education teacher at the school, replaced him. Farrar became head of Synergy until August 2019, when he retired. In 2024, Tim Gibbs retired and Jon Croucher became the current headmaster.

In 2018, Helen McGuinness, former head of social sciences at the school, was welcomed back as college director. In September of that year, the high school introduced a ban on mobile phones, while allowing them to be hidden in school bags and to be used if "under explicit instruction by a teacher", citing small distractions as the original reason. Head teacher Tim Gibbs noted a decline in bullying following the ban. French TV channel France 2 filmed in Reepham High School to report on the ban.

In 2024, it was reported that Synergy Multi Academy Trust had proposed 30 job losses across two schools in order to address what it says is a budget deficit of £2.9 million, including 16 teaching roles, one leadership post and eight support staff posts at Reepham.

== Ofsted and specialisation ==
Since 2006 the school has been a specialist Science, Mathematics and Vocational school.

In 2006, the Eastern Daily Press reported that Reepham High was the only school in Norfolk to carry Ofsted's “Outstanding” ranking. In September 2008, the school was ranked “Outstanding” for a third time and scored the highest overall grade possible. After converting to Academy status in 2012, the school subsequently lost its "Outstanding" rating in the inspection of May 2013, becoming "Good". The high school retained its "Good" rating in its 2016 and 2020 inspections.

== Notable alumni ==
=== High school ===
- Jed Steer, Aston Villa goalkeeper
- Carl Rogers, former captain of Norfolk County Cricket Club
- Bruce Fielder (a.k.a. Sigala), musician
- Iona Lake, steeplechaser
