= Litcham =

Village in Norfolk, England

Coordinates: 52.72415°N 0.79142°E

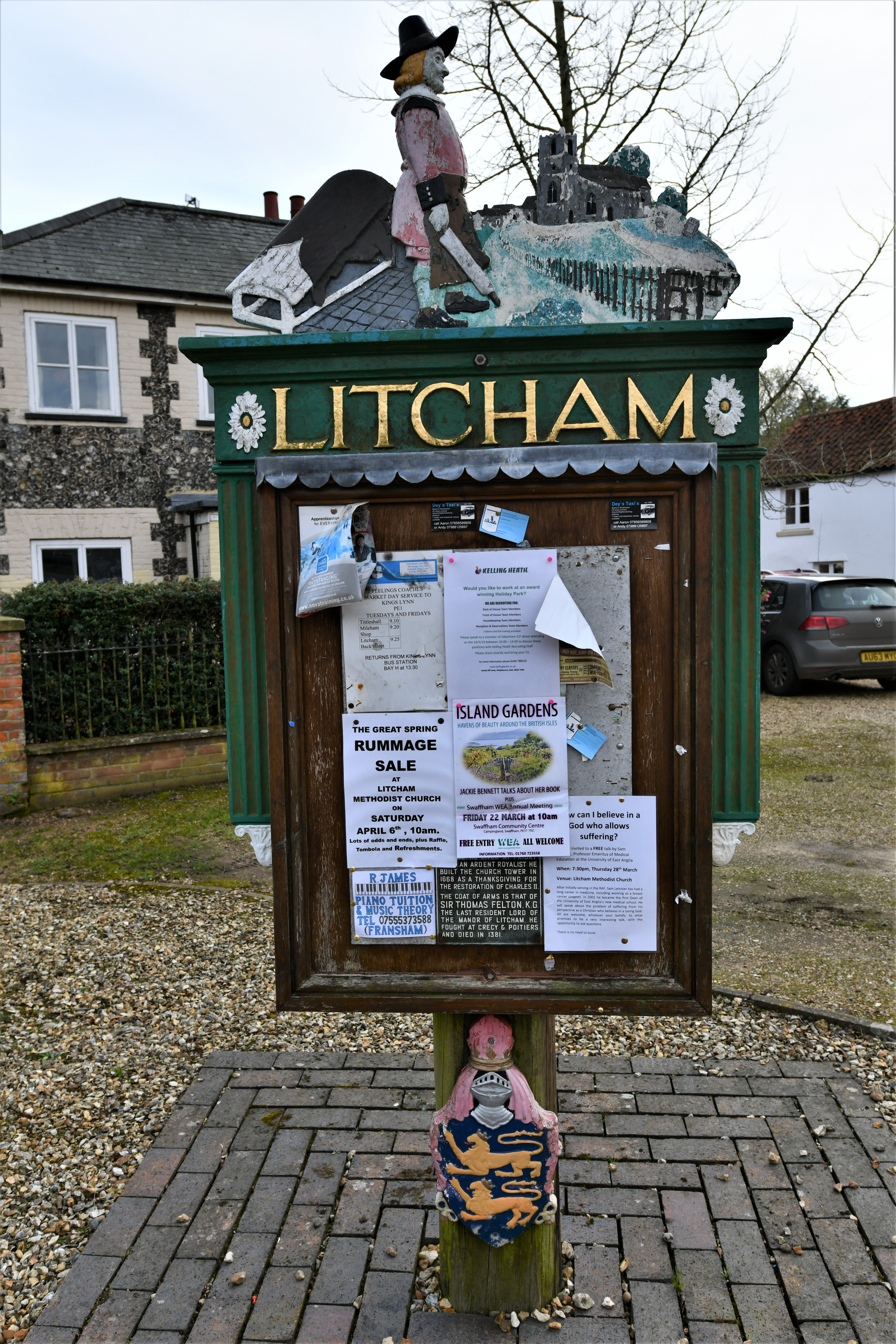
- Litcham Village Sign

- Location within Norfolk
- Area: 29.0 sq mi (75 km^{2})
- Population: 593 (2021 census)
  - Density: 20/sq mi (7.7/km^{2})
- OS grid reference: TF886177
- District: Breckland
- Shire county: Norfolk
- Region: East
- Country: England
- Sovereign state: United Kingdom
- Post town: KING'S LYNN
- Postcode district: PE32
- Dialling code: 01328
- Police: Norfolk
- Fire: Norfolk
- Ambulance: East of England
- UK Parliament: South West Norfolk
- Website: http://litcham.org/

Litcham is a village and civil parish in the English county of Norfolk.

Litcham is located 10 km (6.2 mi) north-east of Swaffham and 40 km (25 mi) west of Norwich, along the B1145.

== History ==
Litcham's name is of Anglo-Saxon origin and derives from the Old English for the enclosure homestead.

In the Domesday Book, Litcham is listed as a settlement of 46 households in the hundred of Launditch. In 1086, the village was divided between the East Anglian estates of King William I and Hermer de Ferrers.

From the Fourteenth Century, Litcham Priory stood in the village which served as a hermitage. Today, the medieval stonework has been incorporated into a farmhouse.

Mileham Windmill stands just within Litcham. It was built in the mid-19th century and worked until 1918. Dismantled in the mid-1930s, the tower survives.

== Geography ==
According to the 2021 census, Litcham has a population of 593 people which shows a decrease from the 618 people recorded in the 2011 census.

The B1145, between King's Lynn and Mundesley, passes through the village.

== All Saints' Church ==
Litcham's parish church dates from the Fifteenth Century. All Saints' is located on Church Street and has been Grade I listed since 1960. The church holds Sunday service three times a month and is part of Upper Nar Benefice.

All Saints' red-brick churchtower was built in the Seventeenth Century at the expense of Matthew Halcott, a master tanner who grew wealthy. The church also holds an extravagant painted rood screen as well as a memorial to Lieutenant Frederick K. Fitzroy of the 81st Regiment of Foot who died in Mussoorie.

== Litcham Common ==
Litcham Common is situated the south of the village and is a managed nature reserve consisting of 28 hectares of lowland heath and mixed woodlands. The Nar Valley Way long-distance footpath runs across the common, is never far from the river, and offers a variety of scenery along the country lanes and tracks. The path follows farm tracks through Lexham Estate; at each end it passes through commons managed as nature reserves at Litcham and Castle Acre. A Bronze Age burial mound or tumulus was discovered on the common and Roman settlements and roads have been found just outside the village.

Grazing Scheme : In 2006 Litcham Common Management Committee put forward proposals to introduce grazing which is recommended as by far the best way of preserving this type of habitat. The Management Committee submitted a formal application to the Secretary of State for the erection of stock proof fencing which was approved on 12 February 2007. Fencing was erected in May 2008 and four semi-feral Dartmoor ponies arrived in June 2008. The common is divided in two by the Dunham Road and the ponies currently only graze the western half.

== Amenities ==
Litcham School caters to children aged 4 to 16 and is part of the Synergy Multi-Academy Trust. The headteacher is Mr. S. Wilson.

== Governance ==
Litcham is part of the electoral ward of Launditch for local elections and is part of the district of Breckland.

The village's national constituency is South West Norfolk which has been represented by Labour's Terry Jermy MP since 2024.
