= Sir Isaac Newton Sixth Form =

Sixth form free school in Norwich, England

- Logo for Sir Isaac Newton Sixth Form.

Location
- The Old Fire Station; 30 Bethel Street; Norwich, Norfolk, NR2 1NR; England; 52°37′42″N 1°17′24″E

Information
- Type: Free school
- Established: September 2013
- Trust: Inspiration Trust
- Department for Education URN: 139896 Tables
- Ofsted: Reports
- Principal: Chris Jennings
- Gender: Coeducational
- Age: 16 to 19
- Capacity: 480
- Website: https://www.isaacnewtonsixthform.org

Sir Isaac Newton Sixth Form is a specialist maths and science sixth form with free school status located in Norwich, owned by the Inspiration Trust. It has the capacity for 480 students aged 16–19. It specialises in mathematics and science.

== History ==
Prior to becoming a Sixth Form College the building functioned as a fire station serving the central Norwich area until August 2011 when it closed down. Two years later the Sixth Form was created within the empty building with various additions being made to the existing structure. The sixth form was ranked the 7th best state sixth form in England by the Times in 2022. Overall academic performance has been maintained and improved over the years with "An impressive 85% of grades received were A*-C" with this being 2% rise than the year prior (2023), and 9% higher than the national average.

== Curriculum ==
At Sir Isaac Newton Sixth Form, students can study a choice of either maths, further maths, core maths, biology, chemistry, physics, computer science, environmental science or psychology. Additionally, students can also study any of the subjects on offer at the partner free school Jane Austen College, also located in Norwich and specialising in humanities, Arts and English.
