= The Hewett Academy =

Secondary school and sixth form in Norwich, England

Location
- Cecil Road; Norwich, Norfolk, NR1 2PL; 52.61387°N 1.28865°E

Information
- Type: Academy
- Established: 1954
- Local authority: Norfolk
- Trust: Inspiration Trust
- Department for Education URN: 142059 Tables
- Ofsted: Reports
- Gender: Coeducational
- Age: 11 to 18
- Houses: Gurney, Colman, Jewson and Eaton
- Website: http://www.hewett.org.uk

The Hewett Academy (formerly The Hewett School and before that Hewett Grammar School and Lakenham Secondary Schools) is a coeducational secondary school and academy located in the south of Norwich, Norfolk, England. It has its roots in the junior section of the 1901 Norwich Technical Institute.

== History ==
=== Norwich Technical Institute and Junior Technical College (1901–1958) ===
The Norwich Technical Institute opened in 1901 on St George's Street. In 1950, S. O. Hesketh became head of the institute's junior section, the Junior Technical College. When the Institute moved to a new Ipswich Road building, becoming Norwich City College, the Junior Technical College moved with it.

=== Hewett Grammar School (1958–1970) ===
In 1958, the Junior Technical College became a school in its own right. It moved to a new building on Hall Road, adjoining the Lakenham Secondary Modern Schools (see below) and was renamed the Hewett Grammar School, after Mordecai Hewett's trust. The school initially took 120 children who showed academic promise in tests at age 11.

=== Lakenham Secondary Modern Schools (1954–1970) ===
The boys' and girls' Lakenham Secondary Schools were founded by Norwich City Council in 1954–55, serving the growing southern part of the city and replacing a number of smaller existing schools. The school was built on a large site at the edge of the city on Cecil Road. The secondary modern schools, with a stronger vocational emphasis, took those who did not pass the selection for the grammar school.

=== Formation of comprehensive school (1970) ===
The three schools were managed separately under the City of Norwich Education Committee until, following national policy, the decision was made to switch to the comprehensive system across the city. In 1970 all three schools were combined to form a comprehensive school, under headteacher Walter Roy.

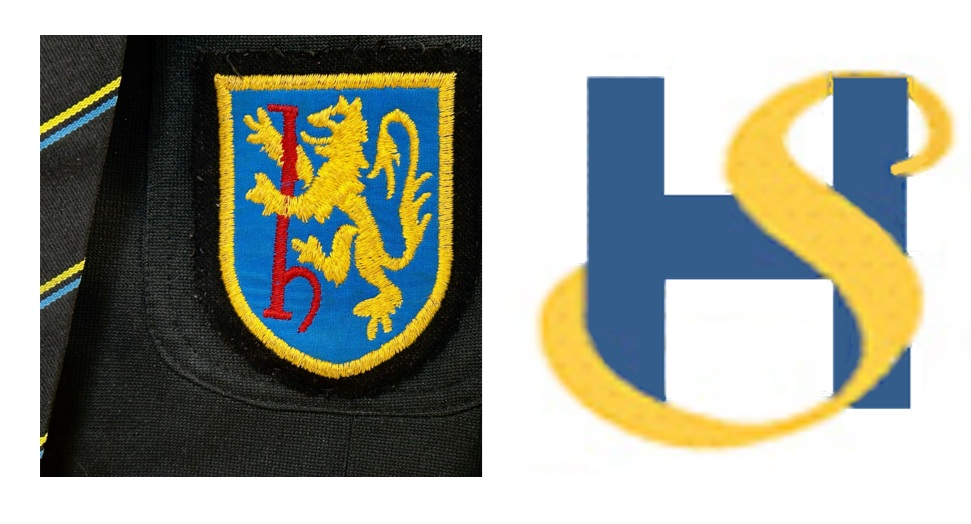
Former school badges: "City of Norwich lion and 'h'" crest used 1970-1990s; "HS logo" used 1990s–2015.

Amalgamation took the school roll to around 1,800 pupils and 200 staff, ranking among the largest in the country. Much care was taken to develop a pastoral system to ensure that the needs of individual children were catered for, while taking advantage of the school's size to offer the widest possible choices across vocational and academic subjects.

=== Academisation (2015) ===
In March 2015, the Department for Education issued an Academy Order which forced the Hewett School to convert to academy status. The order was issued after the school was deemed "inadequate" by an Ofsted inspection and was placed in special measures. 1,300 people signed a petition against the order. However, the school became an academy in September 2015 and is now sponsored by the Inspiration Trust.

In April 2018, the school was rated "good" by Ofsted, a rating confirmed by a further Ofsted inspection in October 2023.

In November 2018, centenarian former test cricketer Eileen Ash opened a sports hall named in her honour at the school.

=== School rebuilding programme (2022–2026) ===
In 2022, the Department of Education announced that the Hewett had been selected to receive funding from the School Rebuilding Programme for major reconstruction. The project replaces most of the school's original 1950s buildings with modern teaching spaces. The whole Hewett Grammar School campus will be demolished as part of this work, and the school concentrated on the former Lakenham Schools site, where the Walter Roy Theatre and clocktower will be retained and all other buildings replaced. Demolition commenced in 2025.

=== Reunions ===
Two major reunion events have been held at the Hewett in recent years. In July 2015 the compulsory academisation was marked with the Big Reunion, bringing together more than 1,000 current and former staff, pupils and parents of the Hewett School and its predecessors. In November 2024, the Grand Reunion, organised by former pupils, teachers and the academy, provided a final opportunity to look around the original school buildings with displays recounting the school's history; more than 2,000 attended.

== Mordecai Hewett ==
The school is named after Mordecai Hewett (1662–1708), a Norwich merchant weaver and merchant who bequeathed money establishing a trust to support the training of "young master weavers and inhabitants of the city of Norwich, and especially the parishes of St Peter Hungate and St Andrew". Hewett's trust merged with others to become the Hewett and Penning Trust, and later supported bursaries and scholarships to study at the Norwich Junior Technical College. On the college's transition to the Hewett Grammar School, the trust was repurposed to provide support to students from lower income families. The Hewett Academy adopted an owl as its symbol, from the family crest of Mordecai Hewett, which can be seen on his memorial in St Peter Hungate.

== Architecture ==
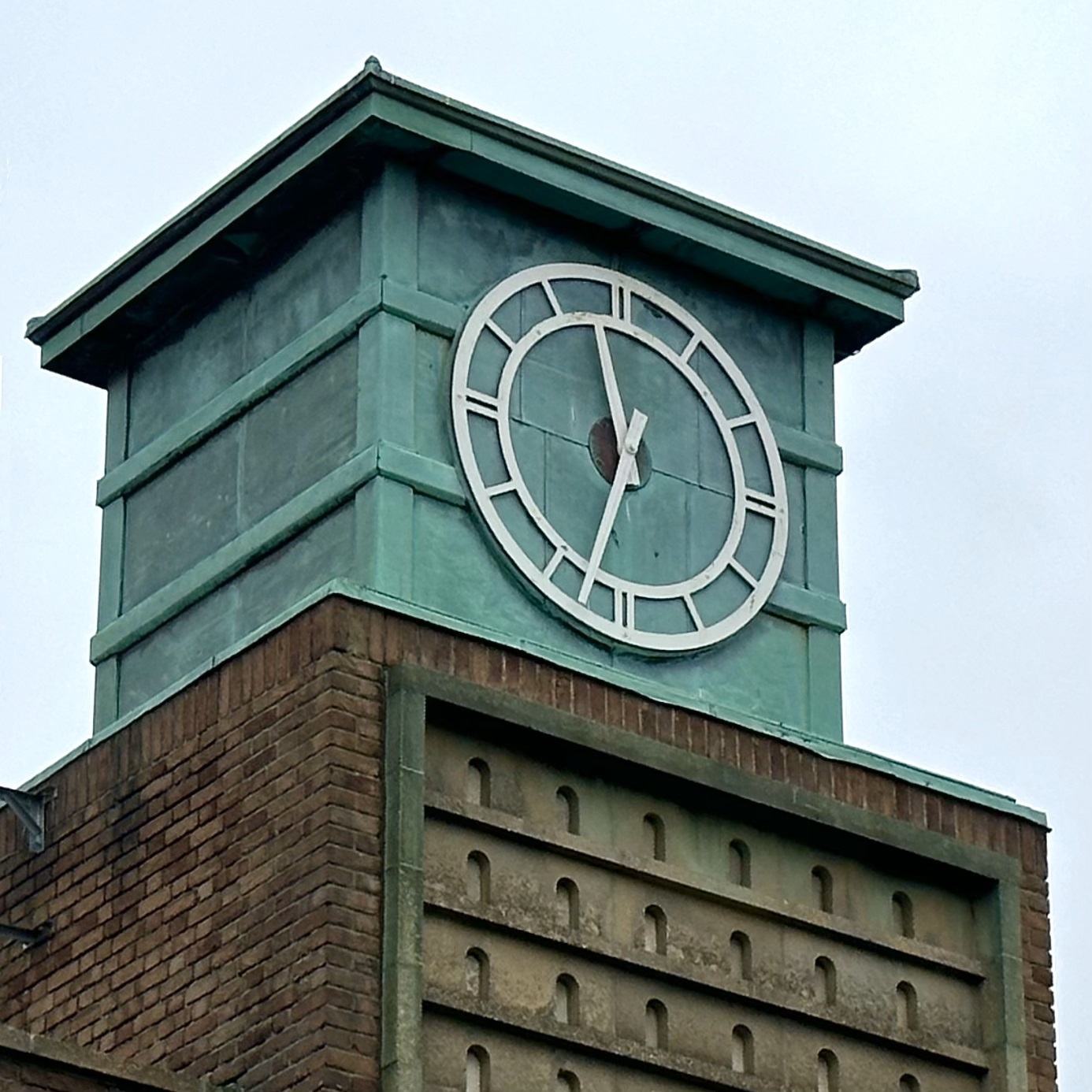
Clock tower of the Lakenham Schools, Norwich, later the Hewett School and Academy, architect Leonard G Hannaford, 1954.

The Lakenham Schools and the Hewett Grammar School buildings were designed in different styles, giving the impression of being from different ages, but were in fact built within a few years of each other.

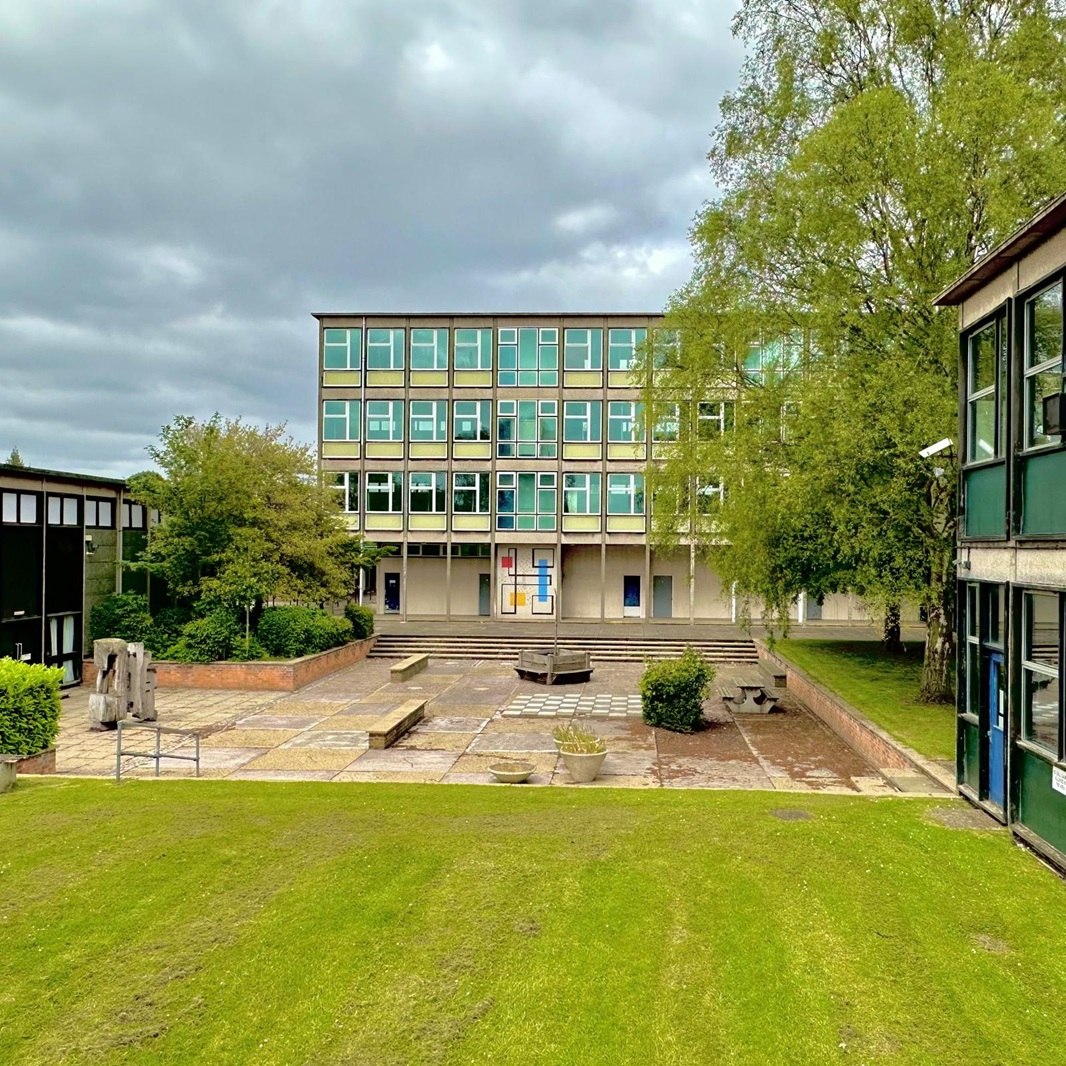
The campus of the Hewett Grammar School, later Hewett Upper School, architect David Percival, completed 1958, demolished 2025.

The Lakenham Secondary Schools, built in 1954–55 were designed by Norwich City Council's chief architect Leonard G Hannaford in a moderne style, with long, light corridors, large Crittall windows and partition walls that could be removed easily to transform the building into a hospital in the event of war. In contrast, the Hewett Grammar School, completed in 1958, was designed in a spacious modern campus style by Hannaford's successor as city architect, David Percival.

The reconstruction of the school from 2024 will see the majority of the original structures replaced with modern buildings designed by local firm LSI Architects, led by project architect Douglas Craven. The new buildings will be constructed around a retained core of Hannaford's 1954 structure, including the school's clock tower and Walter Roy Theatre, which are being restored.

== Notable former pupils ==
- Saraya Bevis, professional wrestler
- Alan Brind, violinist
- Dominic Hubbard, 6th Baron Addington
- Jake Humphrey, television presenter
- Poppy Miller, actor
- Beth Orton, singer-songwriter
- Timothy Softley, chemist
- Ben Stephenson, BBC controller of drama
