= List of Army Cadet Force units =

The Army Cadet Force (ACF) is a cadet organisation based in the United Kingdom. It is a voluntary youth group sponsored by the Ministry of Defence (British Army). Local units of the ACF, called Detachments, are based in towns and villages across the UK and formed of those cadets and Cadet Force Adult Volunteers (CFAVs) parading together at that location.

Detachments are grouped into Areas, which may also be termed Company, Squadron, Battery or Group; which are grouped into Counties, also known as Sectors or Battalions. ACF Counties may encompass one or more geographical counties. Counties are commanded by British Army Regional Points of Command (RPOCs), which report to Regional Command. Each RPOC has a Cadets Branch, responsible for policy and administrative support, and Cadet Training Team, formed of Full-time Reservists and CFAVs who provide support and senior cadet training.

Detachments may be numbered, named for the locality in which it resides, named in accordance with specific regimental or historical links, or a combination of those. Each detachment, and in some cases entire Areas and Counties, will be affiliated with a Regiment or Corps of the British Army, and wear their insignia including cap badge, beret and stable belt.

The following list is broken down into RPOCs, Counties, Areas and Detachment localities.

== 38th (Irish) Brigade ==
=== 1st (Northern Ireland) Battalion, Army Cadet Force ===
- HQ Carryduff
- Weekend Training Centre in Magilligan
- A Company, HQ in Omagh - Cookstown, Dungannon Open, Enniskillen Open, Enniskillen Royal Grammar School, Fivemiletown, Magherafelt, Omagh Open, and Omagh Schools
- B Company, HQ in Derry - Ballymoney, Caw, Coleraine, Coleraine College, Drumahoe, Limavady, Lisneal College, and Newbuildings
- C Company, HQ in Ballymena - Aldergrove, Antrim, Ballyclare, Ballymena, Cambridge House Grammar School, Cullybackey, Glengormley, Larne, and the battalion Band, Drums and Pipes in Antrim
- D Company, HQ in Abbotscroft - Carnmoney, Carrickfergus Open, Carrickfergus Grammar School, Dunmore, Greenisland, Model Schools, Monkstown, Whitehead, and Whitehouse

=== 2nd (Northern Ireland) Battalion, Army Cadet Force ===
- HQ in Carryduff
- Weekend Training Centre in Ballykinler
- E Company, HQ in Armagh - Armagh, Kilkeel, Lurgan Open, Lurgan College, Markethill, Portadown, Richhill, and Tandragee
- F Company, HQ in Belfast - Ballygowan, Ballykinler, Ballynahinch, Banbridge, Banbridge Academy, Breda, Down High, Donaghcloney, Hydebank, Killyleagh
- G Company, HQ in Holywood - Bangor, Comber, Donaghadee, Dundonald, Gransha, Holywood, Movilla, Newtownards, Peninsula, Sullivan Upper
- H Company, HQ in Belfast - Cregagh, Clonaver, Dunmurry, Glenwood, Grosvenor Grammar School, Lisburn, Malone, Moira, Sunnyside Street

== 51st Infantry Brigade and Headquarters Scotland ==
=== 1st Battalion The Highlanders ACF ===
Affiliated to the Royal Regiment of Scotland

- HQ in Inverness
- Weekend Training Centre in Dingwall
- Caithness Company, HQ in Thurso - Brora, Castletown, Farr School, Halkirk, Thurso, and Wick
- Inverness Company, HQ in Inverness - Aviemore, Fort Augustus, Fort William, Fortrose, Inverness, and Raigmore
- Western Isles Company, HQ in Stornoway - Back, Benbecula, Daliburgh, Harris, Stornoway, and West Lewis
- Moray Company, HQ in Elgin - Ardersier, Culloden (two detachments: Culloden, and the battalion Pipes & Drums), Elgin, Forres, and Nairn
- Ross Company, HQ in Dingwall - Alness, Dingwall, Dornoch, Kyle, Tain, and Portree
- Orkney & Shetland Battery - Brae, Kirkwall, Lerwick, and Stromness. Orkney and Shetland Battery still wears the capbadge and associated accoutrements of the Lovat Scouts.

=== 2nd Battalion The Highlanders ACF ===
- HQ & Weekend Training Centre in Boddam, Aberdeenshire
- Vittoria Company (Coy) - Aberdeen (three detachments "badged" Parachute Regiment, one Royal Army Medical Corps and one Royal Scots Dragoon Guards), and remaining Detachments badged as Royal Regiment of Scotland (RRS): Aboyne, Banchory, Stonehaven, and Aberdeen Woodside
- Somme Coy - Aberdeen (three detachments: one badged Royal Engineers, Bridge of Don and the battalion Pipes and Drums), Ellon, Inverurie, Peterhead, and Peterhead (badged Royal Signals)
- Corunna Coy - Banff, Buckie, Fraserburgh, Huntly, Keith, Portsoy, and Turriff

=== Angus and Dundee Battalion ACF ===
- HQ & Weekend Training Centre in Barry Buddon
- Arras Company, HQ in Forfar - Arbroath (Black Watch), Brechin, Forfar, Kirriemuir, Montrose
- Cambrai Company, HQ in Dundee - Arbroath (Royal Artillery), Carnoustie, Grove, Monifieth, Panmure Scots DG
- Salamanca Company, HQ in Dundee - Dundee Royal Artillery, Dundee Parachute Regiment, Dundee Royal Army Medical Service, Dundee Royal Signals, and Stobswell
- Waterloo Company, HQ in Dundee - the battalion Pipes and Drums in Dundee, Dundee Royal Scots Dragoon Guards, Kirkton, Newport Scots DG, St Marys, and Strathmore Royal Engineers

=== Argyll and Sutherland Highlanders Battalion ACF ===
Affiliated to the 5th Battalion, Royal Regiment of Scotland (Argyll and Sutherland Highlanders)

- HQ in Dumbarton
- Weekend Training Centres in Arrochar, Argyll and Lochgilphead
- Balaklava Company - Callander, Dunblane, Pipe Major McLellan Detachment (Pipes and Drums in Stirling), Stirling, Alloa, Alva, Tillicoultry, and Tullibody
- Malaya Company - Bo'ness, Camelon, Denny, Falkirk, Grangemouth, and Larbert
- Orleans Company - Campbeltown, Dunoon, Isle of Mull, Lochgilphead, and Oban
- Aden Company Clydebank, Dumbarton, Garelochhead, Helensburgh, Milngavie and Vale of Leven
- Cambrai Company - Bishopbriggs, Cumbernauld, Kilsyth and Kirkintilloch. Most of Cambrai Company are affiliated to the Royal Tank Regiment.

=== Black Watch Battalion ACF ===
- HQ in Perth
- Weekend Training Centres in Dunkeld and Glenrothes
- Battalion Bands in Glenrothes - Pipes and Drums, and Military Band
- Alma Company - Auchterarder, Crieff, Kinross, Newburgh, and Perth Viewlands
- Burma Company - Cupar, Kirkcaldy, Leven, St Andrews, and Woodside (Glenrothes)
- Korea Company - Blairgowrie, Dunkeld, Perth, Pitlochry, and Stanley
- Ypres Company - Ballingry, Cowdenbeath, Dunfermline, Rosyth, and Viewfield (Glenrothes)

=== Glasgow and Lanarkshire Battalion ACF ===
Detachments are named for the various Regiments and Corps they are affiliated to.

- HQ & Weekend Training Centre in Cambuslang.
- Amiens Company
  - 1 Platoon Royal Scots Borderers (Strathaven)
  - 2 Platoon Royal Scots Borderers (Motherwell)
  - 3 Platoon Royal Scots Borderers (Newmains)
  - 3 Troop Royal Engineers (Airdrie)
  - 4 Platoon Scots Guards (Bellshill)
  - 5 Platoon Royal Scots Borderers (Coalburn)
  - 5 Platoon Scots Guards (Lanark)
  - 6 Platoon Royal Scots Borderers (Larkhall)
- Invictus Company
  - 1 Platoon Royal Electrical and Mechanical Engineers (East Kilbride)
  - 2 Platoon Royal Electrical and Mechanical Engineers (East Kilbride)
  - 4 Platoon Royal Scots Borderers (Hamilton)
  - 6 Troop Royal Scots Dragoon Guards (Govan)
  - A Platoon Royal Highland Fusiliers (King's Park)
  - B Platoon Royal Highland Fusiliers (Cambuslang)
  - D Platoon Royal Highland Fusiliers (Pollokshaws)
  - Pipes and Drums Detachment (Cambuslang)
- Normandy Company
  - A Troop Royal Artillery (Broomhill)
  - B Troop Royal Artillery (Drumchapel)
  - C Platoon Royal Highland Fusiliers (Easterhouse)
  - C Troop Royal Artillery (Anderston)
  - D Troop Royal Artillery (Carmyle)
  - E Platoon Royal Highland Fusiliers (Beardmore) - in Shettleston
  - E Troop Royal Signals (Queens Cross) - in Kelvinbridge
  - F Platoon Royal Highland Fusiliers (Glasgow Highlanders) - in Maryhill

=== Lothian and Borders Battalion ACF ===
- HQ & Weekend Training Centre in Broxburn.
- Alma Company
  - 10 Bonnyrigg Platoon
  - 11 Penicuik Platoon
  - 12 Dalkeith Platoon
  - 19 Gilmerton Troop
  - 20 Colinton Road Platoon
  - 21 Chesser Crescent Troop
  - 22 Lanark Road Troop
  - 35 Alnwickhill Troop
  - 36 Loanhead Platoon
  - Military Band - in Chesser Crescent
- Kohima Company
  - 14 Musselburgh Troop
  - 16 Dunbar Troop
  - 17 Granton Square Platoon
  - 18 East Claremont Street Platoon
  - 23 McDonald Road Troop
  - 24 South Queensferry Platoon
  - 31 Tranent Platoon
  - 32 Prestonpans Platoon
  - 33 Haddington Troop
  - 34 North Berwick Platoon
- Minden Company
  - 1 Eyemouth Platoon
  - 2 Duns Platoon
  - 4 Kelso Platoon
  - 5 Jedburgh Platoon
  - 6 Hawick Platoon
  - 8 Galashiels Platoon
  - 9 Selkirk Platoon
  - 15 Peebles Platoon
- Somme Company
  - 25 Linlithgow Troop
  - 26 Livingston Platoon
  - 27 Bathgate Platoon
  - 28 Broxburn Platoon
  - 29 Whitburn Platoon
  - Broxburn Academy - Linked Detachment
  - Pipes and Drums - at Redford Barracks

=== West Lowland Battalion ACF ===
- HQ & Weekend Training Centre in Ayr
- Balaklava Company - Arran, Erskine, Garnock Valley (Beith), Gourock, Port Glasgow, Renfrew, Rothesay, and Saltcoats
- Inkerman Company - Auchinleck, Ayr, Belmont, Dalmellington, Girvan, Kilmarnock (two detachments: one Royal Artillery, one Royal Highland Fusiliers), Maybole, and Tarbolton
- Kohima Company - Barrhead, Giffnock, Irvine, Johnstone, Paisley (two detachments: one Royal Artillery, one Royal Engineers), and Troon
- Minden Company - Annan, Castle Douglas, Dalbeattie, Dumfries - three detachments: one in Dumfries Academy, one on North West Community Campus, and one in Nunfield House Army Reserve Centre, Kirkconnel, Kirkcudbright, Lockerbie, Moffat Academy, Newton Stewart, and Stranraer

== 160th (Welsh) Brigade ==
=== Clwyd and Gwynedd ACF ===
- HQ & Weekend Training Centre in Kinmel Camp, Bodelwyddan
- Burma Company - Amlwch, Bangor, Bethesda, Conwy, Holyhead, Llandudno, Llangefni, Menai Bridge, and Penmaenmawr
- Cambrai Company - Bradley, Brynteg, Buckley, Llangollen, Mold, Rhos, Rossett, and Wrexham
- Minden Company - Barmouth, Blaenau Ffestiniog, Caernarfon, Llanberis, Penygroes, Porthmadog, Pwllheli, and Tywyn
- Somme Company - Colwyn Bay, Deeside, Denbigh, Flint, Holywell, Kinmel, Prestatyn, and Rhyl
- Crecy Company - Senior cadet training

=== Dyfed and Glamorgan ACF ===
Detachments within the county are affiliated to the Royal Welsh, Welsh Guards, 1st The Queen's Dragoon Guards, Royal Monmouthshire Royal Engineers, Royal Logistic Corps, Royal Corps of Signals, Royal Electrical and Mechanical Engineers, and Royal Army Medical Service.

- HQ & Weekend Training Centre in Litchard, Bridgend
- A Company (Cardiff & Barry) - Barry, Cathays, Fairwater, Gabalfa, Llandaff North, Penarth, and Tŷ Llewellyn
- B (Rorke's Drift) Company (Swansea & Neath) - Clydach, Glamorgan Street, Gorseinon, Morfa, Morriston, Neath, Port Talbot, The Grange, and Townhill
- C Company (Bridgend & Pontypridd) - Bridgend, Maesteg, Pontypridd, Porthcawl, Talbot Green, and Tonyrefail
- D Company (Merthyr Aberdare & Rhondda) - Cwmbach, Ferndale, Hirwaun, Merthyr, and Mountain Ash
- E (QDG) Squadron - Fishguard, Haverfordwest, Milford Haven, Narberth, Neyland, Pembroke Dock, and Tenby
- F (RW) Company - Band (Corps of Drums) in Llanelli, Burry Port, Llanelli, St Clears, and Trimsaran
- G (Welsh Guards) Company - Aberystwyth, Ammanford, Cardigan, Carmarthen, Cross Hands, Garnant, Lampeter, Newcastle Emlyn

=== Gwent and Powys ACF ===
- HQ & Weekend Training Centre in Cwrt y Gollen
- A Company - Builth Wells, Knighton, Llandrindod Wells, Llanfair Caereinion, Llanfyllin, Llanidloes, Machynlleth, Newtown, and Welshpool
- B Company - Brecon, Crickhowell High School, Cwrt-y-Gollen, Cwrt-y-Gollen Band Det (F), Gilwern, Gurnos, Hay-on-Wye, and Talgarth
- C Company - Band in Raglan Barracks, Cwmbran, Griffithstown, Malpas, Pontypool, Raglan Barracks, and Rhiwderin
- D Company - Aberbargoed, Abertillery, Abertillery Learning Community, Blackwood, Caerphilly, Cascade, Cwmcarn, Ebbw Vale, and Tredegar
- E Company - Abergavenny, Blaina, Caldicot, Caldicot School, Chepstow, Monmouth
- Zulu Company - Senior Cadets and Adult Development
- Cyprus SBA Episkopi ACF - Episkopi and Dhekelia

== HQ Centre (East) ==
=== Bedfordshire and Hertfordshire ACF ===
- HQ in Hertford
- Weekend Training Centre in Bassingbourn Barracks
- 1 Company - Bishop's Stortford, Borehamwood, Cheshunt, Hatfield, Hertford, Hoddesdon, Waltham Cross, and Ware
- 2 Company - Buntingford, Harpenden, Hitchin, Letchworth, Royston, Stevenage (two detachments: Stevenage (North), and Stevenage (South)), and Welwyn Garden City
- 3 Company - Berkhamsted, Hemel Hempstead, Leavesden Green, Rickmansworth, South Oxhey, St Albans, Tring, and Watford
- 4 Company - Ampthill, Chicksands, Dunstable, Leagrave, Leighton Buzzard, Lidlington, Luton and Stanbridge
- 5 Company - Bedford, Biggleswade, Cranfield, Kempston, New Cardington, Sandy, and Stotfold

=== Cambridgeshire ACF ===
- HQ and Weekend Training Centre in Waterbeach
- No 1 (Hereward) Company -, Fletton, Ramsey, Talavera, Walton, Whittlesey, Yaxley, and the Corps Of Drums (In Peterborough)
- No 2 (Cromwell) Company -, Cambourne, Comberton, Huntingdon, Longstanton, Melbourn, St Ives, St Neots and Swavesey College
- No 3 (Ironside) Company - Burwell, Cambridge, Cherry Hinton, Chesterton, Linton, Newmarket, Sawston, Soham, and Waterbeach
- No 4 (Octavia) Company - Cambridge Regional College, Ely, Haddenham, Chatteris, Wisbech, and March

=== Derbyshire ACF (Mercian Regiment) ===
- HQ & Band in Sinfin
- Corps of Drums in Chesterfield
- A Company, HQ in Buxton - Ashbourne, Bakewell, Buxton, Chapel-en-le-Frith, Glossop, Matlock, New Mills, and Wirksworth
- B Company, HQ in Chesterfield - Alfreton, Bolsover, Boythorpe, Chesterfield, Clay Cross, Creswell, Eckington, and Staveley
- C Company HQ in Ilkeston - Belper, Codnor Park, Draycott, Heanor, Ilkeston (two detachments, Ilkeston, and Hallcroft), Long Eaton, and Ripley
- D Company HQ in Derby - Etwall, Kingsway, Mickleover, Phoenix Street, Sinfin, Spondon, Swadlincote, and Ticknall

=== Essex ACF ===
- HQ in Chelmsford
- Weekend Training Centre in Blackheath, Colchester
- A Company - Basildon, Brentwood, Grays, Harris Academy Riverside, Ongar, Stanford-le-Hope, Tilbury, Waltham Abbey, and Warley
- B (Essex Yeomanry) Company - Chelmsford (three detachments: Chelmsford, Melbourne, and Springfield Corps of Drums), Dunmow, Epping, Harlow, Maldon, and Saffron Walden
- C Company - Billericay, Canvey Island, Leigh on Sea, Rayleigh, Shoeburyness, South Woodham Ferrers, Southend-on-Sea, and Wickford
- D Company - Blackheath, Braintree, Clacton, Colchester (two detachments: Colchester, and Parsons Heath), Dovercourt, Manningtree, and Witham.

=== Leicestershire, Northamptonshire and Rutland ACF ===
- HQ in South Wigston
- Weekend Training Centre in Yardley Chase
- A Company - "Anzio" in Northampton Academy, Clare Street Drill Hall (three detachments: A Coy Corps of Drums, "Burma", and "Simpson"), Gibraltar Barracks (three detachments: "Gibraltar", "Quebec", and "Salamanca"), "Kabritt" in Towcester, "Martinique" in Daventry, "Rhine" in Magdalen College School, and "Talavera" in Moulton College
- B Squadron - Leicester (five detachments: Blackbird Road, Brentwood Road (two detachments: Brentwood Road, and B Sqn Corps of Drums), Hadrian Road, and Ulverscroft Road), Braunstone, Desford, Evington, Glen Parva, Hinckley, Lutterworth, Oadby, Syston (Wreake Valley), and Wigston
- D Company - Market Harborough, "Montagu" in Kettering, Raunds, Rothwell (two detachments: Rothwell, and D Coy Corps of Drums), Rushden, and Wellingborough (two detachments: "Waendal", and "Castle")
- E Company - Corby (three detachments: "Alexandra", "Corby III", and E Coy Corps of Drums), Melton Mowbray, Oakham, Prince William School, and St George's
- F Squadron - Ashby, Barrow upon Soar, Castle Donington, Coalville, Ibstock, Loughborough (two detachments: Loughborough, and F Sqn Corps of Drums), and Shepshed

=== Lincolnshire ACF ===
- HQ in Sobraon Barracks
- Weekend Training Centre in Beckingham
- 1 Coy, HQ in Lincoln - Cherry Willingham, Metheringham, Navenby, North Hykeham (two detachments: North Hykeham, and the County Band), Sobraon Barracks (three detachments: Abbey, Newport, and Sobraon), and Washingborough
- 2 Sqn, HQ in Sleaford - Billingborough, Bourne (two detachments: one Army Air Corps, one Royal Lancers), Grantham (two detachments: one Royal Logistics Corps, one Royal Lancers), Market Deeping, Sleaford, and Stamford
- 3 Coy, HQ in Boston - Boston, Holbeach, Kirton, Long Sutton, Skegness, and Spalding
- 4 Coy, HQ in Louth - Caistor Yarborough School, Gainsborough, Horncastle, Louth, Market Rasen, Somercotes Saltfleet

=== Norfolk ACF ===
- HQ in Dereham
- Weekend Training Centre in Thetford
- Britannia Company - Aylsham, Cromer, Dereham, Fakenham, Hunstanton, Kings Lynn, North Walsham, and Swaffham
- Cadet Norfolk Artillery (Crosskills) Battery - Acle, Aylsham Road, City of Norwich All Saints Green Detachment Gorleston, Harleston, Loddon, Mousehold
- Cadet Norfolk Engineer Squadron - Attleborough, Diss, Downham Market, Long Stratton, Thetford, Watton, and Wymondham

=== Nottinghamshire ACF ===
- HQ in Toton
- Weekend Training Centre in Chilwell
- A (Rifles) Company - Beeston, Chilwell, Clifton, Ruddington, Sherwood, West Bridgford, and Wigman Road
- B (Mercian) Company - Clipstone, Harworth, Ollerton, Retford, Warsop, and Worksop
- C (South Notts Hussars) Battery - Bath Street, Bulwell, Eastwood, Hucknall, Kirkby-in-Ashfield, and Sutton-in-Ashfield
- D (Sherwood Rangers Yeomanry) Squadron 'Royal Yeomanry'- Arnold, Blidworth, Carlton, Newark, Nottingham Academy, Southwell, and Toot Hill

=== Suffolk ACF ===
- HQ in Ipswich
- A Company - Bury St Edmunds (two detachments: Bury St Edmunds, and "Minden"), Haverhill, Ixworth, Mildenhall, Stowmarket, Sudbury, and Wattisham
- B Company - Beccles (two detachments: Bury St Edmunds, and "Dettingen"), Framlingham, Halesworth, Leiston, Lowestoft, and Pakefield
- C Company - Felixstowe, Hadleigh, Ipswich (three detachments: one Royal Logistic Corps, two Grenadier Guards: "Anzio", and "Waterloo"), Kesgrave, Priory Heath, and Woodbridge

== HQ Centre (West) ==
=== Hereford and Worcester ACF ===
- HQ in Hereford
- Weekend Training Centre in Tiddesley Wood
- Alamein Squadron - Bromsgrove, Church Hill, Droitwich, Halesowen, Redditch, Rubery, and Stourbridge
- Gheluvelt Battery - Evesham, Kidderminster, Malvern, Pershore, St John's, Stourport, and Worcester
- Inkerman Company - Bromyard, Hereford (two detachments: Hereford City Platoon, and Hereford Bugle Platoon), Kingstone, Ledbury, Leominster, and Ross-on-Wye

=== Shropshire ACF ===
- HQ in Copthorne Barracks
- A (Somme) Company - Bridgnorth, Broseley, Dawley Bank, Madeley, Newport, and Shifnal
- B (Lucknow) Company - Donnington, Ellesmere, Market Drayton, Oswestry, Wellington, Wem, and Whitchurch
- C (Peninsula) Company - Band and Bugles in Copthorne Barracks, Bishop's Castle, Church Stretton, Copthorne, Harlescott, Ludlow, Pontesbury, and Shrewsbury

=== Staffordshire and West Midlands (North Sector) ACF ===
- HQ in Beacon Barracks
- Weekend Training Centre in Cannock Chase
- A Company - Aldridge, Bloxwich, Brownhills, Old Hill, Oldbury, T P Riley School, Walsall, West Bromwich, and Willenhall
- B Company - Bilston, Brockmoor, Crestwood, Dudley, Ellowes Hall, Kinver, Perton, Scotts Green, West Park, Wolverhampton, and Wombourne
- C Company - Burton, Cannock, Hednesford, Lichfield, Rugeley, Stafford (two detachments: Stafford, and Band Det (Corps of Drums)), Stone, Tamworth, and Uttoxeter.
- D Company - Bucknall, Cheadle, Cross Heath, Leek (Temporary closed), Sandford Hill, Stockton Brook, Stoke, and Tunstall.

=== Warwickshire and West Midlands (South Sector) ACF ===
- HQ in Harborne
- Weekend Training Centre in Bramcote
- A (Normandy) Company - Alum Rock, Kingstanding, Northfield, Sandwell Academy, Sutton Coldfield, Tennal Grange, Washwood, and Witton
- B (Al Basrah) Company - Alcester, Canley, Coventry (two detachments: Holyhead Road, and Westfield House), Kineton, Leamington, Stratford, and Warwick
- C Company
  - Alexander Road -Fusiliers
  - Barrows Lane - Fusiliers
  - Brandwood - Fusiliers
  - Chelmsley Wood - Fusiliers
  - Haslucks Green - Fusiliers
  - Stoney Lane (Company HQ) - Fusiliers
  - Summit Learning Trust - Rifles
- Z (Minden) Company - All Saints Bedworth, Atherstone, Glascote, Grace Academy, Kingsbury, Nuneaton Band Det (Corps of Drums), Rugby Band Det (Corps of Drums), and Wyken

== London District ==
=== City of London and North East Sector ACF ===
- HQ in Walthamstow
- Weekend Training Centre in Whipps Cross
- 2 Company
  - 21 Cadet Detachment in Shoreditch, Intelligence Corps
  - 22 Cadet Detachment in Hackney, Royal Regiment of Fusiliers
  - 23 Cadet Detachment in Holloway, Royal Engineers
  - 24 Cadet Detachment in Mile End, The Rifles
  - 25 Cadet Detachment in Bethnal Green, Princess of Wales's Royal Regiment
  - 26 Cadet Detachment in Stoke Newington, Life Guards
- 3 Company
  - 10 Cadet Detachment Corps of Drums in Walthamstow
  - 31 Cadet Detachment in Ilford, Inns of Court and City Yeomanry
  - 32 Cadet Detachment in Newbury Park, Royal Anglian Regiment
  - 33 Cadet Detachment in Woodford Green, Royal Anglian Regiment
  - 35 Cadet Detachment in Walthamstow, Inns of Court and City Yeomanry
  - 36 Cadet Detachment in Hainault, Royal Regiment of Fusliers
  - 37 Cadet Detachment in South Chingford Foundation School, Princess of Wales Royal Regiment
- 4 Company
  - 40 Cadet Detachment Corps of Drums in The Brittons Academy
  - 41 Cadet Detachment in Dagenham, Royal Logistics Corps
  - 42 Cadet Detachment in Drapers' Academy, Scots Guards
  - 43 Cadet Detachment in East Ham, Royal Horse Artillery
  - 44 Cadet Detachment in Barking, Royal Horse Artillery
  - 45 Cadet Detachment in Romford, Royal Regiment of Fusiliers
  - 46 Cadet Detachment in West Ham, The Rifles
  - 47 Cadet Detachment in The Brittons Academy, Royal Anglian Regiment
  - 48 Cadet Detachment in Upminster, Royal Logistics Corps

=== Greater London South East Sector ACF ===
- HQ & Weekend Training Centre in Blackheath
- 7 Company
  - 71 Cadet Detachment in Camberwell, London Guards
  - 72 Cadet Detachment in Bacon's College, Princess of Wales's Royal Regiment
  - 74 Cadet Detachment in Tulse Hill, Royal Regiment of Fusiliers
  - 75 Cadet Detachment in Walworth, Royal Army Medical Service
  - 77 Cadet Detachment in Brixton, The Rifles
  - 78 Cadet Detachment in Dulwich, Grenadier Guards
- 9 Company
  - 92 Cadet Detachment in Catford, Royal Engineers
  - 94 Cadet Detachment in Blackheath, Royal Regiment of Fusiliers
  - 95 Cadet Detachment in Eltham, London Guards
  - 96 Cadet Detachment in Grove Park, Royal Artillery
  - 97 Cadet Detachment in Royal Artillery Barracks, Woolwich, Royal Horse Artillery
  - 98 Thamesmead Detachment in Harris Garrard Academy, The Rifles
- 10 Company
  - 101 Cadet Detachment in Penge, Princess of Wales's Royal Regiment
  - 102 Cadet Detachment in Grove Park, Scots Guards
  - 103 Cadet Detachment in Orpington, Royal Regiment of Fusiliers
  - 104 Cadet Detachment in Bromley, Irish Guards
  - 106 Cadet Detachment in Sidcup, Royal Military Police
  - 107 Cadet Detachment in Bexleyheath, Royal Corps of Signals
  - 108 Cadet Detachment in Erith, Royal Engineers
  - 109 Cadet Detachment in Belvedere, Royal Artillery

=== Greater London South West Sector ACF ===
- HQ in 131 Battersea
- 13 Company
  - 131 Corps Of Drums Cadet Detachment in Battersea, Royal Tank Regiment
  - 132 Cadet Detachment in Southfields, London Guards
  - 133 Cadet Detachment in Wandsworth, Royal Military Police
  - 134 Cadet Detachment in Morden, Royal Regiment of Fusiliers
  - 135 Cadet Detachment in Balham, Royal Regiment of Fusiliers
  - 136 Cadet Detachment in Wimbledon College, Princess of Wales's Royal Regiment
  - 137 Cadet Detachment in Putney, Grenadier Guards
- 14 Company
  - 143 Cadet Detachment in Shirley, Princess of Wales's Royal Regiment
  - 144 Cadet Detachment in Croydon, Blues and Royals
  - 145 Cadet Detachment in New Addington, London Guards
  - 146 Cadet Detachment in Croydon, Royal Logistic Corps
  - 148 Cadet Detachment in Coulsdon, Royal Corps of Signals
  - 149 Cadet Detachment in Crystal Palace, The Rifles
- 15 Company
  - 151 Cadet Detachment in Kingston upon Thames
  - 152 Cadet Detachment in Cobham, Royal Regiment of Fusiliers
  - 154 Cadet Detachment in Epsom, Parachute Regiment
  - 155 Cadet Detachment in Ewell, Princess of Wales's Royal Regiment
  - 156 Cadet Detachment in Kingston upon Thames, Royal Regiment of Fusiliers
  - 157 Cadet Detachment in Sutton, Royal Artillery

=== Middlesex and North West London Sector ACF ===
- HQ in 204 White City
- Weekend Training Centre in Hammersmith
- 19 Company
  - 191 (Uxbridge) Royal Corps of Signals
  - 192 (Heston) Army Air Corps
  - 193 (Southall) Royal Logistics Corps
  - 194 (Hounslow) Princess of Wales's Royal Regiment
  - 195 (Staines) Princess of Wales's Royal Regiment
  - 196 (Twickenham) Royal Engineers
  - 197 (Feltham) Royal Regiment of Fusiliers
- 20 Company
  - 201 (Harrow) Royal Army Medical Service
  - 202 (Acton) Royal Engineers
  - 203 (Brentford) Royal Logistics Corps
  - 204 (White City) Parachute Regiment
  - 205 (Wembley) Parachute Regiment
  - 207 (Hammersmith) Royal Corps of Signals
  - 208 (Willesden) Royal Regiment of Fusiliers
- 21 Company
  - 211 (Edgware) Princess of Wales's Royal Regiment
  - 212 (Hornsey) Royal Regiment of Fusiliers
  - 214 (Finchley) Parachute Regiment
  - 215 (Kingsbury) Royal Engineers
  - 216 (Tottenham) Blues & Royals
  - 218 (Barnet) Royal Logistics Corps
- 23 Company

231 in "Suspended animation" (Fulham) RIFLES King's Royal Rifle Corps

  - 232 (Westminster) in St George's Catholic School, RIFLES King's Royal Rifles Corps
  - 233 (Camden) in Russell Square, RIFLES King's Royal Rifles Corps
  - 234 (City of Westminster City School), RIFLES King's Royal Rifles Corps
  - 235 (Westminster) St James' @ Wellington Barracks,
  - Currently Scots Guards
  - Historically London Scottish
  - @ RHQ London Scottish House, 95 Horseferry Road then Rochester Row
  - 236 (Kensington) Life Guards

Formerly London Irish Rifles (Covent of Jesus and Mary) located in Willesden ONLY all female cadet detachment.

Preceded by a Grenadier Guards detachment

  - 237 (Royal Hospital Chelsea)

Formerly London Irish Rifles at Duke of Yorks Barracks, Slone street then Rochester Row.

  - 238 (Regent's Park) Royal Corp of Transport.
  - 239 (Fulham) Royal Yeomanry
  - Formerly 239 (Hammersmith) Parachute Regiment formed from boys ONLY from London Oratory Boys school later transferring to become a CCF Unit.

== Headquarters North East ==
=== Cleveland ACF ===
- HQ in Coulby Newham
- Weekend Training Centre in Stainton Camp
- A Company, HQ in Norton — Billingham, Hardwick, Hartburn, Hartlepool (two detachments: one Royal Engineers and one RIFLES), High Tunstall, Manor College, Norton (two detachments: one Royal Engineers and one Royal Military Police), and Yarm
- B Company, HQ in Coulby Newham — Brambles Farm, Burlam Road, Corps of Drums in Middlesbrough, Coulby Newham, Ingleby Barwick, Lytton Street, Parkwood, St Peter's School, Thornaby, and Trinity College
- C Company, HQ in Loftus — Freebrough Academy, Guisborough School, Guisborough Town, Loftus, Normanby, Nunthorpe School, Redcar, Redcar Academy, and Saltburn

=== Durham ACF ===
- HQ in Chester-le-Street
- Weekend Training Centre in Stainton Camp
- A Company - Alamein, Blaydon, Felling, Gateshead, Hebburn, Jarrow, Northfield Gardens, and Seaburn (Martin Leake)
- B Company - Annfield Plain, Birtley, Chester-le-Street, Consett, Stanley, Sulgrave, Sunderland South, and Washington
- C Company - Durham, Horden, Houghton-le-Spring, Ryhope, Seaham, Shotton Hall, and Ushaw Moor
- D Company - Barnard Castle, Bishop Auckland, Darlington Churchill, Hummersknott, Newton Aycliffe, Spennymoor, and Willington
- D Company - Borneo Band in Chester-le-Street, Inkerman in Gateshead, and Joseph Swan School

=== Humberside & South Yorkshire ACF ===
- HQ & Weekend Training Centre in Driffield
- A Company - Band in Hull, Beverley, Bridlington, Driffield, East Hull, Hedon, Hornsea, Mona House, and Withernsea
- B Company - Brough, Cottingham, Goole, Howden, Hymers College, Middleton, Pocklington, Signals, Wenlock, Wolds, and Wolfreton
- C Company - Adwick, Balby, Bentley, Corps of Drums in Doncaster, Darfield, Doncaster, Mexborough, Rossington, Thorne, and Wath
- D Company - Barnsley, Birdwell, Endcliffe, Greenhill, Hillsborough, Maltby, Manor Top, Rotherham, and Wombwell
- E Company - Ashby, Barton, Brigg, Cleethorpes, Epworth and Isle of Axholme, Grimsby, Immingham, Kirton Lindsey, Scunthorpe, and Waltham

=== Northumbria ACF ===
- HQ in Cramlington
- Weekend Training Centre in Otterburn Training Area
- W Company - Alnwick, Amble, Bellingham, Berwick, Broomhill, and Rothbury
- X Company - Bedlington, Blyth, Cowpen, Cramlington, Guide Post, Morpeth, and Newbiggin
- Y Company - Excelsior Academy, Fenham, Gosforth, Hexham, Kingston, Ponteland, Prudhoe, and Slatyford
- Z Company - Cassino Band of Northumbria Army Cadet Force in Newcastle upon Tyne, Heaton, Heaton Manor, Monkseaton, Seaton Burn, Tynemouth, and Walker

=== Yorkshire (North & West) ACF ===
- HQ & Weekend Training Centre in Queen Elizabeth Barracks, Strensall
- A Company - Catterick, Malton, Northallerton, Ripon, Scarborough, Thirsk, and Whitby
- B Company - Acomb, Castleford, Fulford, Harrogate, Knaresborough, Lumley, Selby, Strensall, and Woodlesford
- C Company - Bradford, Harewood, New Carlton, Otley, Seacroft, Shipley, Thornbury (Corps of Drums), Towerhurst, and Yeadon
- D Company - Allerton, Bingley, Halifax, Huddersfield, Keighley, Odsal, Skipton, Spen Valley, and Thongsbridge
- E Company - Batley, Fitzwilliam, Mirfield, Normanton, Ossett, Pontefract, South Elmsall, and Wakefield

== Headquarters North West ==
=== Cheshire & The Isle of Man ACF ===
- HQ & Weekend Training Centre in Fox Barracks
- Messines Company - Alsager, Congleton, Corps of Drums in Sandbach, Crewe, Nantwich, Northwich, Sandbach, Weaverham, and Winsford
- Normandy Company - Birchwood, Knutsford, Macclesfield, Penketh, Stockton Heath, Warrington, Widnes, Wilmslow, and Woolston
- Somme Company - Chester (two detachments: Abbots Park, and The Castle), Ellesmere Port, Frodsham, Halton, Neston, Runcorn, and Tarporley
- Isle of Man Battery - Castletown, Douglas, Onchan, Peel, Port Erin, and Ramsey

=== Cumbria ACF ===
- HQ & Weekend Training Centre in Carlisle Castle
- Egypt Company - Aspatria, Brampton, Castle, Harraby, Longtown, Maryport, Penrith, and Wigton
- Waterloo Company - Barrow, Cleator Moor, Cockermouth, Dalton, Kendal, Millom, Whitehaven, and Workington

=== Greater Manchester ACF ===
- HQ & Weekend Training Centre in Holcombe Moor Camp
- 1 (Minden) Company - Bury (two detachments: Bury and Corps of Drums), Crumpsall, Heywood, Middleton, Radcliffe, Ramsbottom, and Rochdale
- 2 (Kohima) Company - Bellevue, Chadderton, Collyhurst, Failsworth, Oldham, Royton, and Stalybridge
- 3 (Somme) Company - Bredbury, Cheadle Hulme, Hyde, Levenshulme, Reddish, Rusholme, and Stockport
- 4 (Korea) Company - Broughton, Clifton, Eccles, Flixton, Manchester Academy, Sale, Salford, and Stretford
- 5 (Anzio) Company - Bolton (two detachments: one Royal Artillery, one Duke of Lancaster's Regiment), Hindley, Leigh, Tyldesley, and Wigan (two detachments: one Grenadier Guards, one Queen's Own Yeomanry)

=== Lancashire ACF ===
- HQ & Weekend Training Centre in Fulwood Barracks
- Egypt Company - Accrington, Barnoldswick, Blackburn (three detachments: Blackburn (Royal Signals), "Quebec", and "Somme"), Brierfield, Burnley (two detachments: Burnley Kimberley and Burnley Waterloo), Clitheroe, and Haslingden
- Salerno Company - Chorley, Fulwood, Garstang, Leyland (two detachments: Leyland, and "Dunkirk"), Longridge (two detachments: Longridge, and the Corps of Drums), Lostock Hall, Ormskirk, Preston, and Skelmersdale
- Wingate Company - Blackpool (three detachments: Blackpool, "Chindit", and "Palatine"), Carnforth, Fleetwood, Heysham, Kirkham & Weeton, Lancaster (two detachments: Lancaster, and Lunesdale), Lytham St Annes, Morecambe, and Thornton

=== Merseyside ACF ===
- HQ & Weekend Training Centre in Altcar Training Camp
- 1 Company - Ainsdale, Aintree, Bootle, Crosby, Netherton, Southport, and Walton
- 2 Company - Childwall, Huyton, Kirkby, Newton-le-Willows, Prescot, and St Helens
- 3 Company - Birkenhead, Heswall, Hoylake, New Ferry, Oxton, Upton, and Wallasey
- 4 Company - Aigburth, Allerton, Anfield, Deysbrook, Knotty Ash, Norris Green, and Old Swan

== Headquarters South East ==
=== Buckinghamshire (The Rifles) ACF ===
- HQ in Aylesbury
- A Company
  - 2nd (High Wycombe) Platoon
  - 12th (Marlow) Platoon
  - 16th (Beaconsfield) Platoon
  - 17th (Booker) Platoon
- E Company
  - 3rd (Missenden) Platoon
  - 4th (Aylesbury) Platoon
  - 6th (Chesham) Platoon
  - 21st (Princes Risborough) Platoon
- G Company
  - 11th (Wolverton) Platoon
  - 14th (Buckingham) Platoon
  - 20th (Conniburrow) Platoon
  - 24th (Webber School)
  - Inkerman Band in Aylesbury
- I Company
  - 5th (Denbigh School) Platoon
  - 9th (Bletchley) Platoon
  - 10th (Blakelands) Platoon
  - 18th (Woburn Sands) Platoon
  - 19th (Kents Hill) Platoon

=== Hampshire and Isle of Wight ACF ===
- HQ in Winchester
- Cadet Training Centre in Longmoor
- Arnhem Company, HQ in Fleet
  - 1 (Aldershot) Platoon
  - 2 (Farnborough) Platoon
  - 3 (Alton) Platoon
  - 4 (Fleet & Crookham) Troop
  - 6 (Bordon) Platoon
  - 8 (Gibraltar Barracks) Troop
- Barossa Company, HQ in Cosham
  - 1 (Eastney) Troop
  - 2 (Peronne Road) Platoon
  - 3 (Hayling Island) Platoon
  - 4 (Leigh Park) Platoon
  - 5 (Cosham Tudor) Platoon
  - 6 (Waterlooville) Troop
  - 9 (Gosport) Platoon
  - 10 (Connaught) Platoon
- Cambrai Company, HQ in Fordingbridge
  - 1 (Blackfield) Troop
  - 3 (Fordingbridge) Troop
  - 4 (Hythe) Troop
  - 5 (Lymington) Troop
  - 6 (New Milton) Troop
  - 9 (Totton) Troop
  - 10 (Romsey) Troop
- Dettingen Band Company, HQ in Southampton
  - Dettingen Band
- Gallipoli Company, HQ in Newport
  - 1 (Newport) Troop
  - 2 (Ryde) Troop
  - 3 (Sandown) Troop
  - 4 (West Wight) Troop
  - 7 (Godshill) Troop
- Minden Company, HQ in Winchester
  - 1 (Andover) Flight
  - 3 (Basingstoke) Platoon
  - 4 (Overton) Platoon
  - 5 (Winchester) Platoon
  - 9 (Middle Wallop) Flight
  - 11 (Eastleigh) Platoon
  - Corps of Drums
- Normandy Company, HQ in Millbrook
  - 1 (Park Gate) Platoon
  - 3 (Bitterne Park) Troop
  - 4 (Bishop's Waltham) Troop
  - 5 (Itchen) Troop
  - 6 (Browndown) Platoon
  - 7 (Millbrook) Troop
  - 9 (Fareham) Flight

=== Kent ACF ===
- HQ in Maidstone
- Weekend Training Centre in Folkestone
- A Company - Broadstairs, Canterbury, Deal, Faversham, Herne Bay, Margate, Sittingbourne, and Whitstable
- B Company - Ashford (two detachments: "Alamein", and "Tobruk"), Aylesham, Dover, Folkestone, Shorncliffe, St Marys Bay, and Tenterden
- D Company - Boxley, Cranbrook, Ditton, Mascalls, Moncktons, Snodland, Tonbridge, Tunbridge Wells, and Wrotham
- C Battery -

Dartford Royal Artillery, Swanley Royal Artillery, Gillingham (two detachments: Gillingham, and Woodlands)

Gravesend,

Rochester, Sheerness, Strood, and Walderslade

=== Oxfordshire (The Rifles) Bn ACF ===
- HQ & Weekend Training Centre in MoD Bicester
- Calais Company
  - Banbury Detachment
  - Chipping Norton Detachment
  - Bicester Detachment
  - Kidlington Detachment
  - Thame Detachment
- Nivelle Company
  - Faringdon Detachment
  - Wallingford Detachment
  - Henley Detachment
  - Wantage Detachment
  - Didcot Detachment
- Somme Company
  - Witney Detachment
  - Eynsham Detachment
  - Burford Detachment
  - Falklands House Detachment
  - Carterton Detachment
- Quebec Company, HQ in Newport
  - Abingdon Detachment
  - Blackbird Leys Detachment
  - Headington Detachment

=== Royal County of Berkshire ACF ===
- HQ in Brock Barracks, Reading
- Weekend Training Centre in Bramley Training Area
- A Company
  - 1 Platoon Windsor
  - 2 Platoon Cippenham
  - 3 Platoon Slough
  - 4 Platoon Ascot
  - 5 Platoon Maidenhead
  - 18 Troop Windsor in Combermere Barracks
- B Company
  - 13 Platoon Burghfield
  - 14 Platoon Newbury
  - 15 Platoon Theale
  - 16 Platoon Thatcham
  - 17 Platoon Whitley
- C Company
  - 6 Platoon Woodley
  - 7 Platoon Bracknell
  - 8 Platoon Reading
  - 9 Platoon Caversham
  - 10 Platoon Wokingham
  - 11 Platoon Arborfield
  - Band Detachment in Brock Barracks

=== Surrey (PWRR Bn) ACF ===
- HQ & Weekend Training Centre in Farncombe
- A (Anzio) Company - Banstead, Caterham, Felbridge, Horley, Lingfield, Redhill, Reigate, and Royal Alexandra & Albert School
- B (Burma) Company - Cranleigh, Dorking, Farncombe, Guildford, Haslemere, Leatherhead, Merrow, and [Walton], and Corps of Drums (Guildford)
- C (Cambrai) Company - Addlestone, Chertsey, Chobham, Deepcut, Farnham, Mytchett, Pirbright, Woking, and Yorktown

=== Sussex ACF ===
- HQ in Brighton
- Cadet Training Centre in Crowborough
- A Company
  - 3 Hastings Platoon
  - 8 Crowborough Platoon
  - 10 Eastbourne Detachment
  - 14 Bexhill Platoon
  - 19 Hailsham Platoon
  - 25 Heathfield Platoon
- B (Roussillon) Company
  - 7 Chichester Platoon (in the former Roussillon Barracks)
  - 9 Worthing Platoon
  - 17 Bognor Regis Platoon
  - 18 Littlehampton Platoon
  - 22 Steyning Platoon
  - 26 Thorney Island Detachment (In Baker Barracks)
  - 27 Midhurst Platoon
- C (Gibraltar) Company
  - 4 Lewes Platoon
  - 5 Haywards Heath Platoon
  - 6 Crawley Detachment
  - 11 Horsham Platoon
  - 16 Hurstpierpoint Platoon
  - 24 Burgess Hill Platoon
- D (Cassino) Company
  - 1 Brighton Troop
  - 2 Seaford Platoon
  - 12 Hove Troop
  - 13 Shoreham Platoon
  - 15 Brighton Troop (in Preston Barracks)
  - 21 Newhaven Detachment
- E (Minden) Company
- Incorporating Headquarters elements such as CIS, Adventurous Training, DofE, Shooting Team, Band and the Kitkar display team.
- Former Detachments
  - 20 Chichester College Detachment (Closed)
  - 23 St Bede's Platoon (Closed)

== Headquarters South West ==
=== The Bristol and Channel Islands ACF ===
==== A Company (Rifles) ====
- Keynsham Detachment
- Brislington Detachment
- Withywood Detachment
- Winterstoke Detachment

==== B Squadron (Signals) ====
- Horfield Detachment
- Thornbury Detachment
- Patchway Detachment
- Lawrence Weston Detachment

==== C Company (Rifles) ====
- Yate Detachment
- Mangotsfield Detachment
- Speedwell Detachment
- Kingswood Detachment
- Hanham Detachment

==== Channel Islands Company (RGLI, RJM) ====
- Jersey Detachment
- Guernsey Detachment

==== B&CI Corps of Drums (RLC) ====
- Whitefield Detachment

Cornwall Cadet Battalion (The Rifles) ACF comprises three companies:

- Gibraltar Company has detachments in Camborne, Falmouth, Hayle, Helston, Redruth, Penryn, Penzance, Isles of Scilly and Cornwall College.
- Inkerman Company has detachments in Bude, Liskeard, Looe, Lostwithiel, Launceston, Saltash and Torpoint.
- Lucknow Company has detachments in Bodmin, Newquay, St Austell, St Blazey, Truro and Wadebridge.

Devon ACF is broken down into 3 Rifles badged Companies (B, C, and D) and 1 Royal Wessex Yeomanry badged Squadron (A) with its headquarters in Exeter. All companies and squadrons are assigned a battle honour awarded to the Rifles or one of its antecedent regiments.

- A (Aubers) Squadron (Exeter and East Devon) - Honiton, Sidmouth, Crediton, Uffculme, Tiverton, Exmouth, Wyvern (Exeter)
- B (Bois des Buttes) Company (Plymouth) - Crownhill, Marine Academy, Millbay, Mutley, Plympton, Plymstock
- C (Cambrai) Company (North Devon) - Barnstaple, Bideford, Braunton, Chulmleigh, Holsworthy, Ilfracombe, Okehampton, South Molton, Torrington
- D (Delville Wood) Company (Torbay) - Ashburton, Bovey Tracey, Dawlish, Newton Abbot, Paignton, Teignmouth, Torquay, Totnes

Devon ACF also maintains a Corps of Drums Detachment, whose cadets are normally drawn from across the county's existing Detachments. The Corps of Drums enables cadets to attain qualifications within the Army Proficiency Certificate Music Syllabus.

Dorset ACF consists of one battalion sized unit containing 4 companies with its headquarters in Dorchester.

- E (El Alamein) Company (The Rifles) has detachments in Bournemouth (Boscombe), Christchurch, Lytchett Matravers, Parkstone, Poole, Rossmore and Wallisdown.
- N (Normandy) Company has detachments in Blandford (Rifles), Gillingham (Rifles), Shaftesbury (Rifles), Sherborne (Rifles), West Moors (RLC) and Wimborne (RTR)..
- W (Waterloo) Company Beaminster (Rifles), Bovington (RTR), Bridport (Rifles), Dorchester (Rifles), Lyme Regis (RWxY), Portland (Rifles) and Weymouth (Rifles).

Gloucestershire Cadet Battalion (The Rifles) ACF has detachments in Bishop's Cleeve, Bourton-on-the-Water, Brockworth, Cheltenham, Cinderford, Cirencester, Coleford, Dursley, Fairford, Gloucester (Eastern Avenue, Malmesbury Road, Milton Avenue), Innsworth, Moreton-in-Marsh, Newent, Stonehouse, Stroud, Tetbury, Tewkesbury and Wotton-under-Edge.

Somerset Cadet Battalion (The Rifles) ACF has detachments in: Gibraltar Company - Burnham-on-Sea, Cheddar, Clevedon, Nailsea, Portishead, Weston-Super-Mare, Worle, Yatton Jellalabad Company - Bridgwater, Doniford, Minehead, Taunton, (Bishops Hull, Bishops Foxes and Priorswood), Wellington. Normandy Company - Bath, Coleford, Frome, Glastonbury, Midsomer Norton, Paulton, Shepton Mallet, Wells. Salamanca Company - Bruton (Sexeys School), Castle Cary, Chard, Crewkerne, Ilminster, Langport, Martock, and Yeovil.

Wiltshire ACF has 4 companies. Their affiliate regiments are the Rifles, the Royal Artillery, the Tank Regiment, the Royal Corps of Signals and the Wessex Yeomanry.

A (Ferozeshah): Abbey Park School, Swindon Academy, Dorcan Academy, Royal Wooton Basset, Church Place

B (Anzio): Abbeyfield, Calne, Colerne, Corsham Devizes, Marlborough

C (Arakan): Melksham, Trowbridge, Warminster, Westbury, Lavington, Tisbury

D (Gallipolli): Larkhill, Sarum Academy, Old Sarum, Downton, Bulford
