= List of shipwrecks in May 1878 =

The list of shipwrecks in May 1878 includes ships sunk, foundered, grounded, or otherwise lost during May 1878.

== 1 May ==
List of shipwrecks: 1 May 1878
Ship	State	Description
Medillon	United States of Colombia	The sternwheeler exploded at Honda with the loss of 27 lives. She was on a voyage from Honda to "Caracoli". She was refloated on 4 May but grounded again. Subsequently refloated.
Norden	Sweden	The ship ran aground in the River Nene. She was on a voyage from Gothenburg to Wisbech, Cambridgeshire, United Kingdom. She was refloated the next day and found to be severely leaky.
Sontag	United States	The barque was sighted off "Bouka Island" whilst on a voyage from Sydney, New South Wales to Hong Kong. She may have been the vessel wrecked before 11 June on "Namayonne", in the "Halls Group" whose crew were murdered and eaten by the local inhabitants.

== 2 May ==
List of shipwrecks: 2 May 1878
Ship	State	Description
Alexander	United Kingdom	The brig was wrecked by ice. Her crew survived. She was on a voyage from Runcorn, Cheshire to Akureyri, Iceland.
Bernita	United Kingdom	The brigantine was driven ashore in Dunraven Bay, Glamorgan. Her crew were rescued. She was on a voyage from Bilbao, Spain to Newport, Monmouthshire.
Fawn	United Kingdom	The fishing smack collided with another vessel and sank in the North Sea with the loss of all seven crew.
Henrietta	Germany	The brig was driven ashore on Læsø, Denmark and was severely damaged. She was on a voyage from Dordrecht, South Holland, Netherlands to Riga, Russia. She was refloated and taken in to Fredrikshavn, Denmark.
Union	United Kingdom	The schooner foundered in the North Sea off the Mouse Lightship ( Trinity House) with the loss of one of her three crew. Survivors were rescued by Sherburn (United Kingdom). Union was on a voyage from London to Blakeney, Norfolk.
Unnamed	Board of Customs	The tender collided with the tug Toiler (United Kingdom) in the River Mersey and was beached at Tranmere, Cheshire.

== 3 May ==
List of shipwrecks: 3 May 1878
Ship	State	Description
Abstainer	United Kingdom	The schooner ran aground at Carrickfergus, County Antrim. She was on a voyage from Carrickfergus to a Baltic port.
Active	Norway	The barque ran aground on the Vestr Fingrunddel and was wrecked. Her crew were rescued.
Ada Elizabeth	United Kingdom	The schooner was driven ashore at Kingsdown, Kent. She was on a voyage from Harwich, Essex to Milford Haven, Pembrokeshire. She was refloated and taken in to The Downs.
Escape	United Kingdom	The ketch was driven ashore at Cowes, Isle of Wight. She was on a voyage from Plymouth, Devon to Cowes. She was refloated and taken in to Cowes.
Fria	United Kingdom	The barque was driven ashore at "Ellekalde", north of Helsingør, Denmark. She was refloated with the assistance of a steamship and towed in to Helsingør.

== 4 May ==
List of shipwrecks: 4 May 1878
Ship	State	Description
Bonita	United Kingdom	The full-rigged ship was driven ashore at the Dunraven Castle, Glamorgan. She was on a voyage from Bilbao, Spain to Newport, Monmouthshire.
B1185	France	The fishing lugger was driven ashore at Aberdeen, United Kingdom. She was refloated and taken in to Aberdeen.
City of Aberdeen	United Kingdom	The barque ran aground on the Roan Bank, in the English Channel off New Romney, Kent. She was on a voyage from London to Cleveland Bay, Queensland. She was refloated and taken in to The Downs.
Genie	United Kingdom	The barque ran aground at Leith, Lothian. She was on a voyage from Sfax, Beylik of Tunis, or from Halifax, Nova Scotia, Canada to Leith. She was refloated on 6 May and taken in to Leith.
Hagelik	Norway	The schooner ran aground on the Lillegrunden, in the Baltic Sea. She was on a voyage from Trondheim to Gävle, Sweden.
Jorgen	Flag unknown	The barque ran aground in the River Mersey off the Runcorn Lightship () and was severely damaged. She was refloated.
Lady Clarendon	United Kingdom	The ship ran aground in the North Sea. She was on a voyage from New Orleans, Louisiana, United States to Bremen, Germany.
Leveret	United Kingdom	The schooner ran aground at Ballyness, County Donegal. She was on a voyage from Londonderry to Ballyness.

== 5 May ==
List of shipwrecks: 5 May 1878
Ship	State	Description
Johanne	Denmark	The schooner collided with the steamship Calypso (United Kingdom) in the Øresund and sank. Her crew were rescued. She was on a voyage from Riga, Russia to a Danish port.
Silver Craig	United Kingdom	The barque was driven ashore at Dungeness, Kent. She was on a voyage from London to Callao, Peru. She was refloated and resumed her voyage.

== 6 May ==
List of shipwrecks: 6 May 1878
Ship	State	Description
Arrange	United Kingdom	The schooner was driven ashore on Seal Island, Nova Scotia, Canada. She was on a voyage from Boston, Massachusetts, United States to Cork.
Beaconsfield	United Kingdom	The steamship ran aground off Great Yarmouth, Norfolk. She was on a voyage from South Shields, County Durham to Odesa, Russia. She was refloated and resumed her voyage.
Duna	Russia	The steamship ran aground off Osmussaar. she was on a voyage from Reval to Riga and Saint Petersburg. She was refloated.
Eastern Queen	United Kingdom	The ship ran aground on the Pluckington Bank, in Liverpool Bay. She was on a voyage from New Orleans, Louisiana, United States to Liverpool, Lancashire. She was refloated and taken in to Liverpool.
Peter der Grosse	Germany	The steamship was driven ashore on Seskar, Russia.
Sofala	United Kingdom	The barque ran aground in the Rock Channel. She was on a voyage from Liverpool to Bahía Limón. She was refloated and put back to Liverpool in a leaky condition.
W. H. Harkness	United Kingdom	The ship ran aground in the River Thames at Barking, Essex. She was on a voyage from London to Callao, Peru. She was refloated and taken in to Gravesend, Kent.

== 7 May ==
List of shipwrecks: 7 May 1878
Ship	State	Description
Clara	United Kingdom	The schooner was driven ashore at Ballyferris Point, County Down. She was on a voyage from Glasgow, Renfrewshire to Saint-Malo, Ille-et-Vilaine, France.
Commodore	United Kingdom	The steamship collided with the steamship Wimbledon (United Kingdom) and sank in the Yenikale Strait. Commodore was on a voyage from Marseille, Bouches-du-Rhône, France to Kertch, Russia. She had been refloated and taken in to Sebastopol, Russia by 28 May.
John Clarke	United States	The ship was driven ashore at "Cutter". She was on a voyage from Havre de Grâce, Seine-Inférieure to Calais, Maine. She was a total loss.
Lizzie Gardner	United Kingdom	The steamship was beached at Cairnryan, Wigtownshire. She was on a voyage from Glasgow to Belfast, County Antrim.
Maindee Park	United Kingdom	The steamship was damaged by fire at Königsberg, Germany.
Orvar Odd	Flag unknown	The steamship was damaged by fire at Königsberg.
River Plate	Cape Colony	The ship was wrecked near Guion Point.
Rosa	France	The brig collided with the steamship Denia (United Kingdom) and sank in the North Sea. Her crew were rescued by Denia.

== 8 May ==
List of shipwrecks: 8 May 1878
Ship	State	Description
Eliza	United Kingdom	The fishing boat was abandoned off Whitby, Yorkshire. Her crew were rescued by the Whitby Lifeboat, which later took in to Whitby.
Inheritance	United Kingdom	The ship ran aground on the Joachim Bank, off Shantou, China. She was on a voyage from Niuzhuang to Shantou. She was refloated and taken in to Shantou.
James and Sarah	United Kingdom	The fishing boat was abandoned off Whitby. Her crew were rescued by the Whitby Lifeboat. She subsequently sank.

== 9 May ==
List of shipwrecks: 9 May 1878
Ship	State	Description
Britannia	Norway	The schooner was driven ashore at Nidingen, Sweden. She was on a voyage from Libava, Courland Governorate to Schiedam, South Holland, Netherlands.
Confidence	United Kingdom	The ship sank after being hit by a tidal wave off the coast of Peru.
Esther and Mary	United Kingdom	The ship was driven ashore "near the Fane Lane", County Dublin. She was on a voyage from Bangor to Dundalk, County Louth.
Fayal	Norway	The barque sank at Amsterdam, North Holland, Netherlands.
Maria	United Kingdom	The schooner was driven ashore at Filey, Yorkshire.
Sisters	United Kingdom	The brig ran aground and was wrecked on the Holm Sand, in the North Sea off the coast of Suffolk. Her eight crew were rescued by a yawl. She was on a voyage from South Shields, County Durham to Sheerness, Kent.
W. J. Lewis	Canada	The ship was destroyed by fire in the Atlantic Ocean. Her crew were rescued by the barques Oasis and Titania (both United Kingdom). W. J. Lewis was on a voyage from Buenos Aires to Hamburg, Germany.

== 10 May ==
List of shipwrecks: 10 May 1878
Ship	State	Description
Alarm	United Kingdom	The pilot cutter was run down and sunk in the Bristol Channel by the steamship Foyle (United Kingdom). Her crew were rescued by Foyle.
China	United Kingdom	The steamship suffered an onboard explosion and caught fire at Bombay, India and was scuttled with the loss of three lives.
Hinemoa	New Zealand	The 75-ton schooner left Auckland for Samoa with a crew of six and one passenger, and was not sighted again.
Sardinian	United Kingdom	The steamship was damaged by an onboard explosion and caught fire off Moville, County Donegal. She was scuttled. Four of the 518 people on board were killed. Sardinian was on a voyage from Liverpool, Lancashire to Quebec City, Canada. She was later refloated and taken in to Birkenhead, Cheshire.

== 11 May ==
List of shipwrecks: 11 May 1878
Ship	State	Description
Esther and Mary	United Kingdom	The smack was driven ashore and wrecked at Gormanstown, County Meath. She was on a voyage from Bangor to Dundalk, County Louth.
Lily of the Wave	New Zealand	The 10-ton ketch stranded on a beach near the mouth of Nelson Harbour, during a gale and subsequently broke up.
Mermaid	New Zealand	The 9-ton ketch stranded and was wrecked on North Tata Island during a gale.
Tom of Chester	United Kingdom	The smack sprang a leak and foundered 2 nautical miles (3.7 km) off Drogheda, County Louth. Both crew were rescued by a lifeboat.

== 12 May ==
List of shipwrecks: 12 May 1878
Ship	State	Description
Edward John	United Kingdom	The barquentine was run into by the steamship Lady Downshire (United Kingdom) and sank in the Crosby Channel.
Gipsy	United Kingdom	The schooner-rigged steamship struck rocks and sank in the River Avon at Bristol, Gloucestershire, lying across the river. She was on a voyage from Bristol to Waterford. She broke in two during salvage efforts, blocking the river until 17 May. Her remains were later blown up to clear the river.
Lloyd's Herald	New Zealand	The 48-ton schooner was holed while off the coast of The Catlins during a gale. She was deliberately run ashore at Wiltshire (Wilsher) Bay near Kaka Point to save the lives of the crew.

== 13 May ==
List of shipwrecks: 13 May 1878
Ship	State	Description
Pfeil	Germany	The schooner was wrecked on Boa Vista Island, Cape Verde Islands. Her crew were rescued. She was on a voyage from Hamburg to Lagos, Lagos Colony.

== 14 May ==
List of shipwrecks: 14 May 1878
Ship	State	Description
Leopold Auguste	France	The brig sprang a leak and sank off the Isle of Wight, United Kingdom with the loss of four of her nine crew.
Noord Holland	Netherlands	The ship was driven ashore at Narva, Russia. Her crew were rescued.
Winifred	United Kingdom	The ship ran aground on the Haisborough Sands, in the North Sea off the coast of Norfolk. She was on a voyage from Middlesbrough, Yorkshire to Naples, Italy. She was refloated and taken in to Great Yarmouth, Norfolk.

== 15 May ==
List of shipwrecks: 15 May 1878
Ship	State	Description
Corsair	United Kingdom	The steamship foundered off Browndown, Hampshire with the loss of three of her crew. She was on a voyage from Portsmouth, Hampshire to Cowes, Isle of Wight.
Dolphin	United Kingdom	The ship sprung a leak at latitude 49°00′N 70°10′W. A bottle containing the ships position was found at Padstow Cornwall, along with the following message: Water gaining. Crew taking to boats.
Medina	United Kingdom	The steamship foundered in Stokes Bay with the loss of three of the four people on board. She was on a voyage from Portsmouth, Hampshire to Newport, Isle of Wight.
Remoleader	Venezuela	The tug exploded and sank off Coro with the loss of thirteen of the sixteen people on board.

== 16 May ==
List of shipwrecks: 16 May 1878
Ship	State	Description
Ann Gambles	United Kingdom	The 424-ton barque was driven onto rocks at Tiwai Point, New Zealand during a strong gale and was while trying to enter Bluff Harbour. Her aft bulkhead gave way and the vessel was swamped. All crew survived, but the vessel and cargo were lost. She was on a voyage from Gravesend, Kent to Bluff Harbour.
Unnamed	United States	The schooner was wrecked on São Miguel Island, Azores.

== 17 May ==
List of shipwrecks: 17 May 1878
Ship	State	Description
Beaver	United States	During a voyage from Glenora, British Columbia, Canada, to Wrangell, Department of Alaska, the steamer was wrecked on a reef while passing the Stikine River in Southeast Alaska. Her machinery was salvaged, but otherwise she was a total loss.
Emily	United Kingdom	The brig was driven ashore at Estância, Brazil. She was a total loss.
Madala	United Kingdom	The ship ran aground on the Lappen, in the Baltic Sea. She was on a voyage from Sunderland, County Durham to Kronstadt, Russia.
Pride of the Taff	United Kingdom	The pilot boat was run down and sunk off Lundy Island, Devon by the schooner H. R. Tilton (United States) with the loss of three lives.
Water Hen	United Kingdom	The brig was abandoned in the Atlantic Ocean 112 nautical miles (207 km) east of Flores Island, Azores. Her crew were rescued by the full-rigged ship Cairnsmore (United Kingdom). Water Hen was on a voyage from Maceió, Brazil to the English Channel.
No. 3	United Kingdom	The pilot boat foundered 4 nautical miles (7.4 km) off Aberdeen. All three people on board were rescued by the pilot boat No. 4 (United Kingdom).

== 18 May ==
List of shipwrecks: 18 May 1878
Ship	State	Description
Herbert	United Kingdom	The smack struck a sunken wreck and foundered in the North Sea off the coast of Lincolnshire. Her crew were rescued by a smack.
Kedar	United Kingdom	The barque was abandoned off the Friendly Islands. One of her crew died in the 50 days they spent on a raft. She was on a voyage from the Burrard Inlet, British Columbia, Canada to Melbourne, Australia.
Onega	United Kingdom	The steamship was driven ashore on Anholt, Denmark. She was on a voyage from Saint Petersburg, Russia to London. She was refloated with assistance and towed in to Copenhagen, Denmark the next day.
Shon Quilt	United Kingdom	The barque was abandoned in the Atlantic Ocean. Her nine crew were rescued by Innisfail (United Kingdom) and she subsequently foundered. Shon Quilt was on a voyage from New Orleans, Louisiana, United States to Bristol, Gloucestershire.
Zephyr	Sweden	The schooner was driven ashore and damaged at Marstrand. Her crew were rescued. She was on a voyage from Hull, Yorkshire, United Kingdom to Kronstadt, Russia. She was later refloated with the assistance of two steamships and towed in to Gothenburg.

== 19 May ==
List of shipwrecks: 19 May 1878
Ship	State	Description
Abelone	Denmark	The schooner was driven ashore and wrecked at Hasle, Bornholm. She was on a voyage from Leith, Lothian, United Kingdom to Saint Petersburg, Russia.
Cyrus	Canada	The barque was driven ashore and wrecked on the Towzer Sands, off "Landlos", Glamorgan, United Kingdom. Her eleven crew were rescued. She was on a voyage from Swansea, Glamorgan to Santos, Brazil.
Midias	United Kingdom	The ship capsized in the River Dee near Chester, Cheshire. Her crew were rescued.
Witch	United Kingdom	The barque was driven ashore at Hasle. She was on a voyage from London to Riga, Russia. She was refloated with assistance.
Unnamed	United Kingdom	The smack sank off Warden Point, Isle of Sheppey, Kent.

== 20 May ==
List of shipwrecks: 20 May 1878
Ship	State	Description
Ægean	United Kingdom	The ship was driven ashore on Amager, Denmark. She was on a voyage from London to Luleå, Sweden. She was refloated with assistance and taken in to Copenhagen, Denmark.
Ariel	United Kingdom	The schooner collided with the schooner Goddess (United Kingdom) and was abandoned in the North Sea. Her crew were rescued by Goddess. Ariel was towed in to Grimsby, Lincolnshire in a derelict condition.
Cassandra	United Kingdom	The brig ran aground off Goeree, Zeeland, Netherlands and was wrecked. Her crew were rescued. She was on a voyage from Newcastle upon Tyne, Northumberland to Rotterdam, South Holland, Netherlands. She was a total loss.
Johann Sverdrup	Flag unknown	The barque capsized at Burntisland, Fife, United Kingdom and was wrecked.
Laura	Portugal	The brig was wrecked at Salinas, Brazil with the loss of 170 lives.
Leander	Germany	The brig ran aground on the Spijker Plaat, in the North Sea off the Dutch coast. She was on a voyage from Port-au-Prince, Haiti to Antwerp, Belgium. She was refloated and towed in to Antwerp.
Northumberland	United Kingdom	The steamship ran aground in the Weilingen Channel.

== 21 May ==
List of shipwrecks: 21 May 1878
Ship	State	Description
HMS Cormorant	Royal Navy	The Osprey-class sloop ran into another vessel in the River Medway and was severely damaged.
North Carolina	United States	The ship was driven ashore "at Big Island". She was on a voyage from Wilmington, North Carolina to Liverpool, Lancashire, United Kingdom.
Viking	United Kingdom	The smack sank at Ballywater, County Down.

== 22 May ==
List of shipwrecks: 22 May 1878
Ship	State	Description
Aberystwyth	United Kingdom	The steamship was driven ashore at Dunaverty Castle, Argyllshire. She was on a voyage from Londonderry to Troon, Ayrshire. She was refloated and taken in to Troon.
Lottie	United Kingdom	The steamship was driven ashore at Cap Haïtien, Haiti. She was refloated with assistance.
Roath	United Kingdom	The ship struck the Mearns Blackhead. She was on a voyage from Caen, Calvados, France to Cardiff, Glamorgan. She put in to Falmouth, Cornwall in a leaky condition.

== 23 May ==
List of shipwrecks: 23 May 1878
Ship	State	Description
Abeona	United Kingdom	The schooner foundered in the Bristol Channel south west of Ilfracombe, Devon. Her crew were rescued by the tug Hazard (United Kingdom). Abeona was on a voyage from Cardiff, Glamorgan to Penzance, Cornwall.
Garland	United Kingdom	The brig was wrecked on the Gunfleet Sand, in the North Sea off the coast of Essex. Her nine crew were rescued by the Clacton Lifeboat Albert Edward ( Royal National Lifeboat Institution). Garland was on a voyage from the River Tyne to London.
Khedive, and Voorwarts	United Kingdom; Netherlands	The steamship Voorwarts was run into by the steamship Khedive and was beached at Muka Head, Malaya, where she was wrecked. Her 130 passengers and 81 crew were rescued. She was on a voyage from Batavia, Netherlands East Indies to Amsterdam, North Holland. Khedive was on a voyage from Bombay, India to China. She was taken in to Penang, Malaya in a severely damaged condition.
Soskummeren	Norway	The ship was driven ashore and wrecked on Saaremaa, Russia. She was on a voyage from Rio de Janeiro, Brazil to Helsinki, Grand Duchy of Finland.
Unnamed	Flag unknown	The brig ran aground on the Gunfleet Sand, in the North Sea off the coast of Essex, United Kingdom.

== 24 May ==
List of shipwrecks: 24 May 1878
Ship	State	Description
Elseina Geertruida	Netherlands	The ship ran aground and sank in the Zuyder Zee. She was on a voyage from Kampen, Overijssel to Newcastle upon Tyne, Northumberland, United Kingdom.

== 25 May ==
List of shipwrecks: 25 May 1878
Ship	State	Description
Italian Hero	United Kingdom	The ship ran aground at La Atunara, Spain. She was on a voyage from Genoa, Italy to Liverpool, Lancashire. She was refloated.
Secret	(United Kingdom of Great Britain and Ireland) Jersey	The ketch ran aground on the Goodwin Sands, Kent. She was on a voyage from Rotterdam, South Holland, Netherlands to Jersey. She was refloated.
William and Susannah	United Kingdom	The ketch sprang a leak and sank in the North Sea off Aldeburgh, Suffolk. Her three crew and the ship's dog were rescued. She was on a voyage from London to Spalding, Lincolnshire.

== 27 May ==
List of shipwrecks: 27 May 1878
Ship	State	Description
Othere	United Kingdom	The barque was driven ashore at Barnegat, New Jersey, United States. She was on a voyage from Havre de Grâce, Seine-Inférieure, France to New York, United States.
Stanley	United Kingdom	The steamship ran aground at Kertch, Russia. She was refloated and resumed her voyage.

== 28 May ==
List of shipwrecks: 28 May 1878
Ship	State	Description
Charlotte	Germany	The ship was driven ashore in the River Avon. She was on a voyage from Bristol, Gloucestershire to New York, United States.
Ganger Rolf	Sweden	The ship ran aground on the Langgrogrunden. She was on a voyage from Stockholm to Nordmaling.

== 29 May ==
List of shipwrecks: 29 May 1878
Ship	State	Description
Muriel	United Kingdom	The steamship was driven ashore. She was on a voyage from New Orleans, Louisiana, United States to Liverpool, Lancashire. She was refloated.
Nojet	Russia	The schooner ran aground on the Middlegrund. She was on a voyage from Loviisa, Grand Duchy of Finland to Montrose, Forfarshire, United Kingdom. She was refloated with assistance.
Nonsuch	United Kingdom	The schooner capsized at Wapping, Middlesex. She was righted.
United	United Kingdom	The brig ran aground at Saltholm, Denmark. She was refloated on 1 June and taken in to Helsingør, Denmark.

== 30 May ==
List of shipwrecks: 30 May 1878
Ship	State	Description
Avona	United Kingdom	The ship was damaged by fire in the West India Docks, London.
Stornoway	United Kingdom	The steamship ran aground on a reef in Loch Carron and sank. She was on her maiden voyage, from Stornoway, Isle of Lewis, Outer Hebrides to Stromeferry, Ross-shire. Although declared a total loss, she was refloated in mid-June. Subsequently repaired and returned to service.

== 31 May ==
List of shipwrecks: 31 May 1878
Ship	State	Description
Adela	Nicaragua	The ship was driven ashore and wrecked in a gale at Valparaíso, Chile with the loss of two of her crew.
Anita	Nicaragua	The barque was severely damaged in a gale at Valparaíso.
Avelina Sanchez	Guatemala	The barque was severely damaged in a gale at Valparaíso.
Bella Vista	Nicaragua	The barque was damaged in a gale at Valparaíso.
Bride	United Kingdom	The barque was damaged in a gale at Valparaíso.
Colleen	United Kingdom	The barque was severely damaged in a gale at Valparaíso.
Deva	United Kingdom	The barque was severely damaged in a gale at Valparaíso.
Elisa	Nicaragua	The schooner was driven ashore and wrecked in a gale at Valparaíso.
Elsa	Germany	The barque was abandoned off Valparaíso in a hurricane. Her twelve crew survived.
Elvira Alvarez	Nicaragua	The barque was damaged in a gale at Valparaíso.
Esta	Nicaragua	The barque was severely damaged in a gale at Valparaíso.
Estela	Chile	The schooner was driven ashore and wrecked in gale at Valparaíso.
Freia	Chile	The barque was severely damaged in a gale at Valparaíso.
George Reynes	Chile	The hulk was driven ashore and wrecked in a gale at Valparaíso .
Glenmore	United Kingdom	The barque was severely damaged in a gale at Valparaíso.
SMS Großer Kurfürst, and SMS König Wilhelm	Imperial German Navy	Großer Kurfürst sinking The Preussen-class ironclad Großer Kurfürst was accidentally rammed by the ironclad König Wilhelm and sank off Folkestone, Kent, United Kingdom, with the loss of 284 lives. Survivors were rescued by boats from SMS König Wilhelm and SMS Preussen (Imperial German Navy), and by three fishing vessels:- 27 by Emily, 18 by Susannah, and 17 by Six Brothers (all United Kingdom). König Wilhelm was severely damaged. She was taken in to Portsmouth, Hampshire, United Kingdom for temporary repairs.
Guatemala	France	The barque was damaged in a gale at Valparaíso.
Halcon	Nicaragua	The full-rigged ship was driven ashore and wrecked in a gale at Valparaíso.
Herminia Alvarez	Chile	The full-rigged ship was driven ashore and wrecked in a gale at Valparaíso.
Isabel Clarisa	Chile	The hulk sank in a gale at Valparaíso.
Kent	United Kingdom	The barque was severely damaged in a gale at Valparaíso with the loss of a crew member.
Lotina	United Kingdom	The schooner was damaged in a gale at Valparaíso.
Maffeo	Chile	The hulk was driven ashore and wrecked in a gale at Valparaíso.
Olga	Nicaragua	The full-rigged ship was driven ashore and wrecked in a gale at Valparaíso.
Portena	Nicaragua	The barque was severely damaged in a gale at Valparaíso.
Quillota	United Kingdom	The barque was severely damaged in a gale at Valparaíso.
Rinsonor	Guatemala	The barque was severely damaged in a gale at Valparaísp.
San Fernando	Nicaragua	The barque was damaged in a gale at Valparaíso.
Sarah Julia	Chile	The barque sank in a gale at Valparaíso.
Taltal	Chile	The schooner sank in a gale at Valparaíso.
Tam O'Shanter	Chile	The launch sank in a gale at Valparaíso.
Tavanda	Chile	The hulk was driven ashore and wrecked in a gale at Valparaíso.
Tranisto Alvarez	Nicaragua	The barque was severely damaged in a gale at Valparaíso.
Valparaíso	Chile	The barque was severely damaged in a gale at Valparaíso.
Washington	Chile	The brig was damaged in a gale at Valparaíso.

== Unknown date ==
List of shipwrecks: Unknown date in May 1878
Ship	State	Description
Adrianus	Netherlands	The full-rigged ship was driven ashore at Petten, North Holland. She was refloated with the assistance of a tug and taken in to the Nieuwe Diep.
Alice	United Kingdom	The ship was wrecked on the coast of America. She was on a voyage from Casablanca, Morocco to Rio de Janeiro, Brazil.
Antonio	United Kingdom	The steamship was driven ashore at Cape Henry, Virginia, United States. She was on a voyage from Liverpool, Lancashire to Baltimore, Maryland, United States. She was refloated on 22 May and resumed her voyage.
Caterina Chiazzaro	Italy	The barque was destroyed by fire in the Chincha Islands, Peru before 18 May.
Chicago	United Kingdom	The steamship was wrecked on the Longsand, in the North Sea off the coast of Essex on or before 10 May. Fifteen of her 23 crew were rescued by the pilot cutter Stella (United Kingdom); the rest reached shore in a boat. Chicago was on her maiden voyage, from Hartlepool, County Durham to Boston, Massachusetts, United States.
Clara	United Kingdom	The brig foundered in the Atlantic Ocean before 29 May. She was on a voyage from Runcorn, Cheshire to the Natal Colony.
Cowburn	United Kingdom	The brigantine was wrecked on St. Paul Island, Nova Scotia, Canada. Her crew were rescued.
Deva	United Kingdom	The full-rigged ship was severely damaged in a gale at Valparaíso, Chile.
Emmanuel	United Kingdom	The steamship was driven ashore on Ven, Sweden. She was on a voyage from Stockton-on-Tees, County Durham to Stettin, Germany. She was refloated with the assistance of a steamship and taken in to Copenhagen, Denmark.
Empress of India	United Kingdom	The ship foundered in Lake Ontario with the loss of eight of the seventeen people on board.
Eureka	United States	The ship was abandoned in the Indian Ocean before 16 May. She was on a voyage from New York to Yokohama, Japan.
Golden Plover	United Kingdom	The brig was wrecked at Horsey, Norfolk. Her ten crew were rescued by the Palling Lifeboat. She was on a voyage from Sunderland, County Durham to Bari, Italy. She was refloated on 8 June with the assistance of a tug and towed in to Great Yarmouth, Norfolk in a severely leaky condition.
Harriet G.	United Kingdom	The brig was driven ashore at Paraguana, Venezuela before 15 May. She was on a voyage from Puerto Cabello to Maracaibo.
Jane Milloy	United Kingdom	The schooner was wrecked at Tobago. Her crew were rescued.
Kenley	United Kingdom	The steamship was beached at Whitby, Yorkshire. She was refloated on 3 May and taken in to Whitby.
Lion	United Kingdom	The brig was wrecked at Caravelas, Brazil. Her crew were rescued. She was on a voyage from Rio de Janeiro to Aracaju.
Luiga	Italy	The ship was wrecked on Zea, Greece.
Luiga Madre	Italy	The ship was driven ashore at Pensacola, Florida, United States. She was on a voyage from Pensacola to Hull, Yorkshire, United Kingdom.
Mabel Clarke	United States	The ship was wrecked on Tristan da Cunha. There were six survivors.
Magnolia	United Kingdom	The ship was driven ashore and wrecked in the Magdalen Islands, Nova Scotia. Her crew were rescued. She was on a voyage from Lisbon, Portugal to Quebec City, Canada.
Mangrove	United Kingdom	The steamship collided with the steamship Rose Mary (United Kingdom) and sank in the Mediterranean Sea off Cape Bon, Beylik of Tunis. She was on a voyage from London to Bombay, India.
Maréchal de Turenne	France	The ship was wrecked on Fortune Island, Bahamas. She was on a voyage from Haiti to Havre de Grâce, Seine-Inférieure, France.
Maria Therese	France	The ship was driven ashore. She was on a voyage from Marseille, Bouches-du-Rhône to Rio de Janeiro. She was refloated and towed in to Dénia, Spain, where she was condemned.
Matador	United Kingdom	The ship was driven ashore on Green Island. She was on a voyage from London to Quebec City She was refloated and completed her voyage.
Medellin	Ceylon	The steamship was damaged by a boiler explosion. Several of her crew were killed.
Orange	United Kingdom	The schooner was driven ashore and severely damaged on Seal Island, Nova Scotia, Canada before 7 May. She was on a voyage from Boston, Massachusetts, United States to Cork. She was later refloated and towed in to New York, where she arrived on 14 May.
Pride of Canada	United Kingdom	The ship was abandoned in the Indian Ocean. Some of her crew were rescued by the barque Europa (Norway). Pride of Canada was on a voyage from Liverpool to Rangoon, Burma.
Quillota	United Kingdom	The barque was severely damaged in a gale at Valparaíso.
Scout	United Kingdom	The barque was wrecked on the coast of Patagonia, Argentina. She was on a voyage from Swansea, Glamorgan to Valparaíso.
Sophia Bowen	United Kingdom	The ship was damaged at sea whilst on a voyage from Cardiff, Glamorgan to Buenos Aires, Argentina. She put in to Santa Cruz de la Palma, Canary Islands on 14 May. She was condemned.
Stornoway	United Kingdom	The ship struck a submerged rock and sank in Loch Carron.
Thorn	United Kingdom	The smack was wrecked at Drogheda, County Louth. Both crew were rescued by the Drogheda Lifeboat.
Uranus	United Kingdom	The ship was driven ashore near Libava, Courland Governorate. Her crew were rescued. She was on a voyage from Newcastle upon Tyne, Northumberland to Riga, Russia.
Vanguard	United Kingdom	The East Indiaman, a barque, foundered in the Indian Ocean before 22 May with the loss of all twenty crew. She was on a voyage from Colombo, Ceylon to London. Wreckage washed up on the coast of the Natal Colony.
Vestalinden	Norway	The ship was driven ashore and wrecked in the Saint Lawrence River at English Point, Quebec, Canada with the loss of three of her crew. She was on a voyage from Kragerø to Quebec City, Canada.
Yang Tsze	France	The steamship ran aground in the Suez Canal. She was on a voyage from Marseille to China.
