= Marine Academy Detachment =

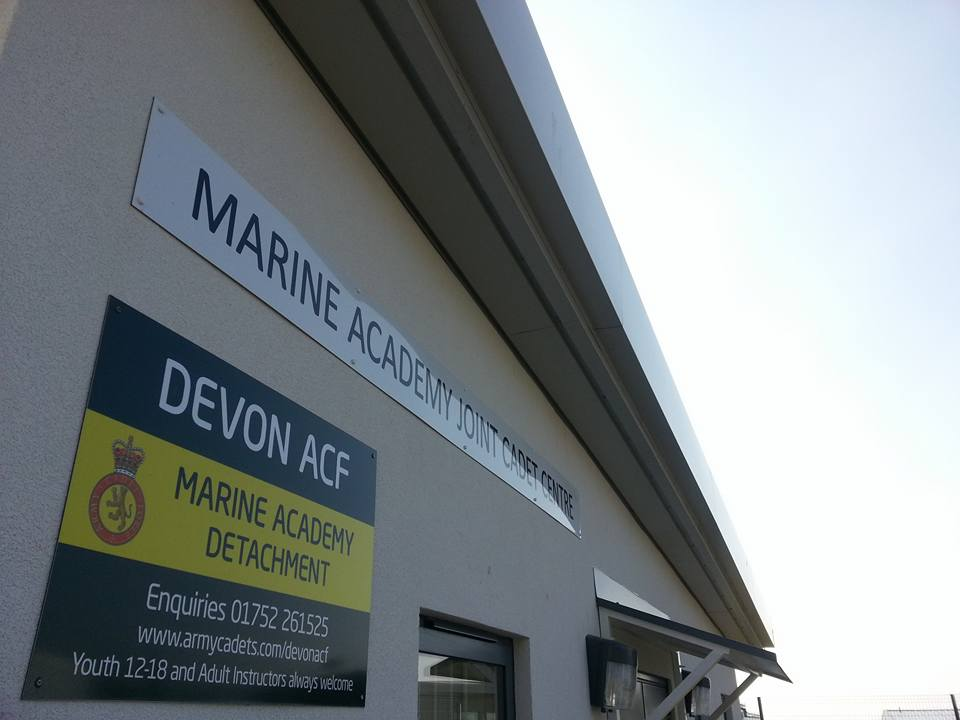
- Marine Academy Joint Cadet Centre

Location
- Newton Avenue; Plymouth, Devon, PL5 2AF; England
- Coordinates: 50.40617°N 4.17577°W

Information
- Established: 2015
- Age: 12 to 18
- Company: B (Plymouth)
- Affiliation: RIFLES
- Parade Nights: Tuesdays and Thursdays
- Website: armycadets.com/county/devon-acf/

Marine Academy Detachment (not to be confused with Marine Academy Plymouth) is an Army Cadet Force Detachment (formerly Platoon) situated within the school grounds of Marine Academy Plymouth. The Detachment is part of Devon ACF, B Company (Plymouth ACF).

== Administration ==
Marine Academy Detachment is run by a team of volunteers known as Adult Instructors. The team is led by a Detachment Commander (formerly Platoon Commander) who in turn reports to the local Company Commander. Each Company consists of a number of Detachments, variance in strength depends on geography of area.

=== B Company Devon ACF ===
B Company (Bravo Company) covers Plymouth and the surrounding area, it consists of 7 Detachments:

- Marine Academy Detachment
- Mutley Detachment
- Crownhill Detachment
- Tavistock Detachment
- Ivybridge Detachment
- Plymstock Detachment
- Plympton Detachment

=== Devon ACF ===
Devon ACF is broken down into 4 companies with its headquarters in Exeter. Devon ACF's regimental affiliation is to the Rifles, an Infantry Regiment in the British Army which counts the Devonshire and Dorset Regiment amongst its antecedent regiments. The Detachments of Devon ACF are as follows:

- A Company (Exeter and East Devon) - Wyvern (Exeter), West Exe (Exeter), Exmouth, Crediton, Honiton, Cullumpton, Tiverton, Sidmouth, Uffculme
- B Company (Plymouth) - Tavistock, Plymstock, Plympton, Mutley, Marine Academy Detachment, Ivybridge, Crownhill.
- C Company (North Devon) - South Molton, Okehampton, Holsworthy, Ilfracombe, Torrington, Braunton, Bideford, Barnstaple, Chulmleigh
- D Company (Torbay) - Bovey Tracey, Brixham, Newton Abbot, Paignton, Teignmouth, Tiverton, Torquay, Totnes

== Syllabus ==
The Army Cadet Force follows a national syllabus known as the Army Proficiency Certificate. The syllabus is broken into 9 categories with equal weighing:

- Fieldcraft
- Skill at Arms & Shooting
- Navigation (DofE)
- Physical Achievement
- Cadet in the Community
- First Aid (St. John's Ambulance)
- Signals
- Drill and Turnout
- Military Knowledge

== Ranks ==
Ranks in the ACF follow the pattern of those in the British Army.

=== Cadet ranks ===
As well as learning new skills by working through the APC syllabus, experienced cadets can be awarded a rank. As the Army allows its soldiers to take on responsibility and leadership as Non-commissioned Officers or NCOs, so too does the ACF.

| Insignia | | | | | | | |
| Rank | Cadet | Cadet Lance Corporal | Cadet Corporal | Cadet Sergeant | Cadet Staff/Colour Sergeant | Cadet Sergeant Major/Company Sergeant Major | Cadet Regimental Sergeant Major |

Cadet NCOs wear the issued cadet rank slides, pictured above. The titles of some ranks may vary as cadet detachments are affiliated to Army regiments and adopt their terminology. There is usually only one Cadet RSM per county.

Although promotion is based on merit rather than progression through the APC syllabus, the following criteria must be met before a cadet is eligible for promotion:

- Cadet Lance Corporal - Passed APC 1 Star
- Cadet Corporal - Passed APC 2 Star
- Cadet Sergeant - Passed APC 3 Star
- Cadet Staff/Colour Sergeant - Passed APC 4 Star
- Cadet Sergeant Major/Company Sergeant Major - Passed APC 4 Star
- Cadet Regimental Sergeant Major - Master Cadet

In some instances, cadets that do not meet the requirements for these ranks can be promoted with the agreement of the ACF Cadet Commandant.

=== CFAV ranks ===
The adults who are employed to help run the ACF are collectively known as Cadet Force Adult Volunteers(CFAVs). There are two different kinds of CFAVs, Non-commissioned Officers and Commissioned Officers. As in the Regular Army and Army Reserves, Commissioned Officers out-rank NCOs. The role of the CFAV NCO is to instruct Cadets, the role of the CFAV Officer is to instruct Cadets and command CFAV NCOs.

==== NCOs ====
NCO CFAVs wear the badges of rank as worn by Army NCOs with the addition of the letters ACF under the badge.

| Insignia | | | | | |
| Rank | Probationary Instructor (PI) | Sergeant Instructor (SI) | Colour Sergeant/Staff Sergeant Instructor (SSI) | Sergeant Major Instructor (SMI) | Regimental Sergeant Major Instructor (RSMI) |

==== Officers ====
Commissioned officers within the ACF wear the same rank slides as British Army officers; however, the letters ACF appear under the insignia. The colours and style of the rank slides mirror the affiliated regiment's.
