= Stainton, County Durham =

Village in County Durham, England

Coordinates: 54.564°N 1.893°W

Stainton
- Location within County Durham
- Population: 476 (2011)
- OS grid reference: NZ070187
- Civil parish: Streatlam and Stainton
- Unitary authority: County Durham
- Ceremonial county: County Durham
- Region: North East
- Country: England
- Sovereign state: United Kingdom
- Post town: BARNARD CASTLE
- Postcode district: DL12
- Police: Durham
- Fire: County Durham and Darlington
- Ambulance: North East

Stainton is a village in County Durham, in England. It is situated to the north east of Barnard Castle.

== Geography ==
Stainton Village has entirely residential with around 100 houses and no local amenities. The former public house, chapel, post office and shop are now private residences. Many of the properties are period properties and owned by older residents.

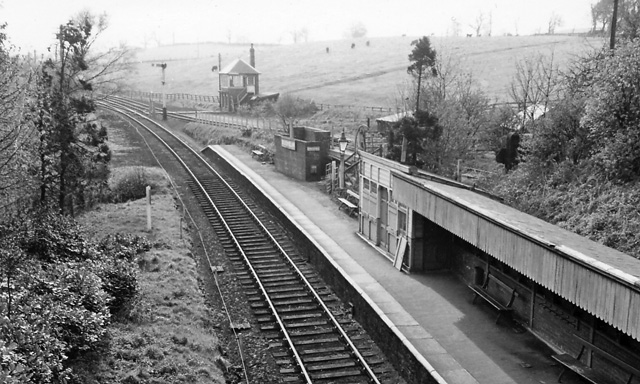
Broomielaw station which was private to the Bowes-Lyon of Streatham Castle seen in 1965

Just across the road from Stainton Village is Broomielaw, once a picnic area and home to an old railway station (now on private land) where Queen Elizabeth The Queen Mother used to travel to get to Streatham Castle.

== History ==
Stainton Camp was a British Army military installation.

=== 1998 Harrier crash ===
On 18 December 1998, Harrier 'ZD434' crashed, with Group Captain David Ayton Haward, aged 45; he was married with two children, being the Station Commander of RAF Wittering. He joined the RAF in 1971.
