= Sobraon Barracks =

Military barracks in Lincoln, England

- Lincoln
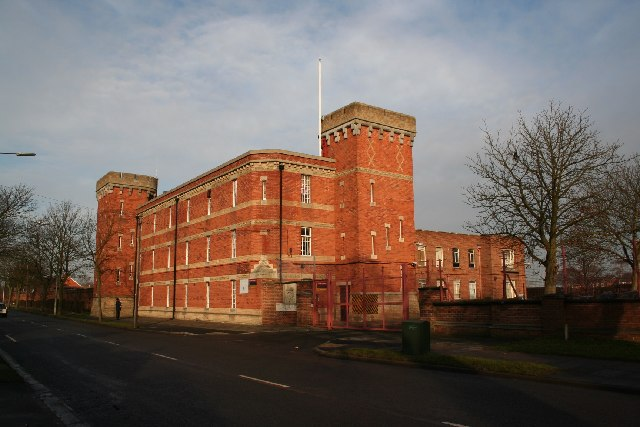
- Sobraon Barracks

Site information
- Type: Barracks
- Owner: Ministry of Defence
- Operator: British Army

Location
- Location within Lincolnshire
- Coordinates: 53°14′59″N 00°33′19″W

Site history
- Built: 1890
- Built for: War Office
- In use: 1890-Present

Garrison information
- Occupants: Royal Lincolnshire Regiment (Former), 160 (Lincoln) Squadron Royal Logistic Corps (Current)

Sobraon Barracks is a military installation in Lincoln, England. It is currently occupied by the 160 (Lincoln) Squadron Royal Logistic Corps, Lincolnshire Army Cadet Force and 204 (Lincoln) Squadron, Air Training Corps.

== History ==
The "new barracks" were built in the Fortress Gothic Revival Style to the north of the "old barracks" on Burton Road and were completed in 1880. The new barracks became the depot for the two battalions of the 10th (North Lincolnshire) Regiment of Foot. Their creation took place as part of the Cardwell Reforms which encouraged the localisation of British military forces. Following the Childers Reforms, the regiment evolved to become the Royal Lincolnshire Regiment with its depot in the barracks in 1881.

In 1953 the new barracks were renamed "Sobraon Barracks" by the then commanding officer, Colonel P J E Rowell OBE MC, after the Battle of Sobraon, a confrontation in which the 10th (North Lincolnshire) Regiment of Foot had seen action during the First Anglo-Sikh War. The Regiment amalgamated with the Northamptonshire Regiment to form the 2nd East Anglian Regiment in 1960. Large parts of Sobraon Barracks were demolished in the 1970s although the keep still remains and is still used as an Army Reserve Centre by Lincolnshire Army Cadet Force and 204 (Lincoln) Squadron, Air Training Corps.

In March 2014 it was announced that 160 (Lincoln) Squadron Royal Logistic Corps would be based at Sobraon Barracks.
