= The Brittons Academy =

Location
- Ford Lane; Rainham, Central London, RM13 7BB; England; 51.53645°N 0.18836°E

Information
- Type: Academy
- Motto: Excellence in all that we do
- Established: 1952
- Department for Education URN: 136576 Tables
- Ofsted: Reports
- Principal: C Whiley
- Gender: Mixed
- Age: 11 to 16
- Enrolment: 720
- Houses: Westwood; Mandela; Moore; Shakespeare
- Website: www.brittons.havering.sch.uk

The Brittons Academy (formerly Brittons School) is a mixed secondary school located in the Rainham area of the London Borough of Havering, England.

The Brittons Academy had an Ofsted report of "Good" in all categories following an inspection on 5/6 October 2022.

The school first opened in 1952 as a bilateral Technical School for pupils aged 11 to 15. Technical students were transferred to the newly opened Abbs Cross Technical High School in 1958, and Brittons was redesignated as a coeducational secondary modern school. In 1973 the school was redesignated as a comprehensive school, and by 1981 the school was operating a sixth form for pupils aged up to 18. The sixth form provision was removed in 1990 due to local authority restructuring and Brittons became an 11-16 school. It gained Specialist Technology college status in 2001, and became a Foundation School in 2009.
