= Cwrt-y-Gollen =

Military training centre in Wales

- Crickhowell
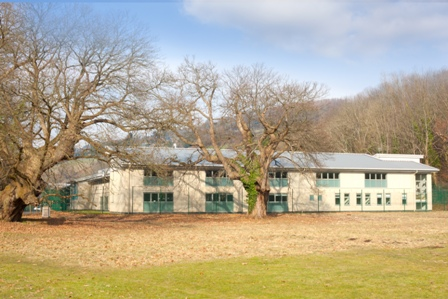
- Cadet Training Centre - Cwrt-y-Gollen

Site information
- Type: Barracks
- Owner: Ministry of Defence
- Operator: British Army

Location
- Location within Powys
- Coordinates: 51°50′44″N 03°06′48″W

Site history
- Built: 1963
- Built for: War Office
- In use: 1963–present

Cwrt-y-Gollen ("Hazel Court") is a British Army training base, 2 miles (3 km) south-east of Crickhowell and just north of the A40 road and the River Usk, in southeastern Powys, Wales.

== History ==
Cwrt-y-Gollen became the regional centre for infantry training as the Welsh Brigade Depot in 1963. It was announced in 1984 that the depot would close in the interests of economy.

== Current use ==
Cwrt-y-Gollen training camp is currently used by several services of the British Armed Forces. Most notably by the British Army as a reserve center for B Detachment (North), 203 (Welsh) Multi-Role Medical Regiment.

It is also the headquarters for the Gwent and Powys Army Cadet Force (ACF).
