= Stainton Camp =

- Stainton, County Durham
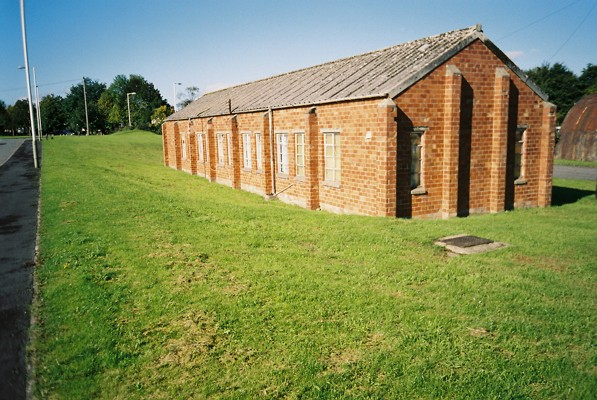
- A former military building at Stainton Camp which has since been converted for industrial use

Site information
- Type: Barracks
- Owner: Ministry of Defence
- Operator: British Army

Location
- Location within County Durham
- Coordinates: 54.555°N 1.888°W

Site history
- Built: 1941
- In use: 1941-Present

Stainton Camp is a military installation at Stainton, County Durham, England.

== History ==
The camp was built in 1941 during the Second World War and served as part of the Battle School before the school moved to Warminster in 1945. Another section of the site was allocated as Blackbeck Prisoner of War Camp during the war. After the war married quarters were built on that part of the site now known as Stainton Grove. The camp went on to be used as a holding facility for units about to deploy on operations and, notably, the Green Howards prepared there for the Suez Crisis. Most of the camp closed in 1972 but parts of it remain in use as a cadet training centre.

Other military installations in the local area were Barford Camp (used as military accommodation into the 1960s but now a motor sports racing track), Deerbolt Camp (used as military accommodation into the 1960s, decommissioned in the early 1970s and now HM Prison Deerbolt), Humbleton Camp (also part of the Battle School during the Second World War, decommissioned in 1960 and now a chalet development) Streatlam Camp (used as military accommodation until 1970, when 6 Armoured Brigade returned to Germany, and now demolished) and Westwick Camp (used as military accommodation into the late 1950s, decommissioned in 1960 and now demolished).
