= Browndown =

UK Site of Special Scientific Interest

Coordinates: 50.789°N 1.181°W

- Site of Special Scientific Interest
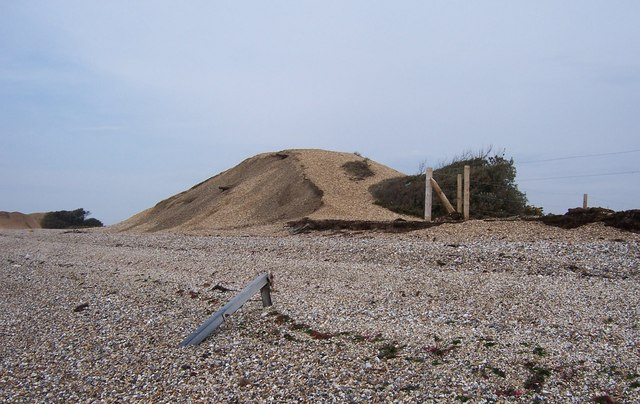
- Location of Browndown.
- Area of search: Hampshire
- Grid reference: SZ 578 991
- Interest: Biological
- Area: 66.5 hectares (164 acres)
- Notification date: 1985
- Location map: Magic Map

Browndown is a 66.5-hectare (164-acre) biological Site of Special Scientific Interest (SSSI) in Gosport in Hampshire.

This is a shingle beach owned by the Ministry of Defence, which has areas of heather, grass heath and gorse. There are a range of invertebrates specialising in these habitats, including 90 flies, 60 aculeata and 83 true bugs, including the rare Dalman's leatherbug.
