= Education in England =

Department for Education
- Secretary of State for Education Minister of State for Skills: Lucy Powell Jacqui Smith

National education budget (2008–09)
- Budget: £62.2 billion

General details
- Primary languages: English
- System type: National
- Compulsory education: 1880

Literacy (2012)
- Total: 99%

Enrollment
- Total: 11.7 million
- Primary: 4.50 million (in state schools) (2016)
- Secondary: 2.75 million (up to Year 11 in state schools) (2016)
- Post secondary: Higher Education: 1,844,095 (2014/15); Further Education: 2,613,700 (2014/15); Total: 4,457,795 (2014/15)

Attainment
- Secondary diploma: Level 2 and above: 87.4% Level 3 and above: 60.3% (of 19 year olds in 2015) Level 2 and above: 81.0% Level 3 and above: 62.6% (of adults 19–64 in 2014)
- Post-secondary diploma: Level 4 and above: 41.0% (of adults 19–64 in 2014)

Education in England is overseen by the Department for Education, a ministerial department of the Government of the United Kingdom. Local government authorities are responsible for implementing policy for public education and state-funded schools at a local level. State-funded schools may be selective grammar schools or non-selective comprehensive schools. All state schools are subject to assessment and inspection by the government department Ofsted (the Office for Standards in Education, Children's Services and Skills). England also has private schools (some of which are known as public schools) and home education; legally, parents may choose to educate their children by any suitable means.

The state-funded compulsory school system is divided into Key Stages, based upon the student's age by August 31. The Early Years Foundation Stage is for ages 3–4. Primary education is divided into Key Stage 1 for ages 5–7 and Key Stage 2 for ages 7–11. Secondary education is divided into Key Stage 3 for ages 11–14 and Key Stage 4 for ages 14–16. At the end of Year 11 (at age 15-16) students typically take General Certificate of Secondary Education (GCSE) exams or other Level 1 or Level 2 qualifications.

Education is compulsory until 18, thus post-16 education can take a number of forms, and may be academic or vocational. This can involve continued schooling, known as sixth form, leading to A-levels or alternative Level 3 qualifications. It can also include work-based apprenticeships, traineeships and volunteering. The Regulated Qualifications Framework (RQF) covers national school examinations and vocational education qualifications.

Higher education often begins with a three-year bachelor's degree. Postgraduate degrees include master's degrees, either taught or by research, and doctoral level research degrees that usually take at least three years. The Framework for Higher Education Qualifications (FHEQ), which is tied to the RQF, covers degrees and other qualifications from degree-awarding bodies.

== History of English education ==
During the Middle Ages, schools were established to teach Latin to the sons of the aristocracy destined for priesthood or monastic work with the ministry of government or the law. Two universities were established in affiliation with the church: the University of Oxford and the University of Cambridge, to assist in the further training of the Catholic Christian clergy.

Education in England remained closely linked to religious institutions until the nineteenth century, although charity schools and "free grammar schools", which were open to children of any religious beliefs, became more common in the early modern period.

Public schools, and the universities of Oxford and Cambridge, for example through English public school football games and the Cambridge rules established in 1848, played a significant role in the development of modern sports, which shaped British sports that spread worldwide.

Nineteenth century reforms expanded education provision and introduced widespread state-funded schools. Until 1870 all schools were charitable or private institutions, but in that year the Elementary Education Act 1870 (33 & 34 Vict. c. 75) permitted local governments to complement the existing elementary schools in order to fill any gaps. The Education Act 1902 allowed local authorities to create secondary schools. The Education Act 1918 abolished fees for elementary schools.

Women's colleges were established in the 19th century to give women access to university education, the first being Bedford College, London (1849), Girton College, Cambridge (1869) and Newnham College, Cambridge (1871). The University of London established special examinations for women in 1868 and opened its degrees to women in 1878. University College Bristol (now the University of Bristol) became the first mixed higher education institution in England upon its foundation in 1876, followed in 1878 by University College London (which had held some mixed classes starting in 1871).

== Legally compulsory education ==
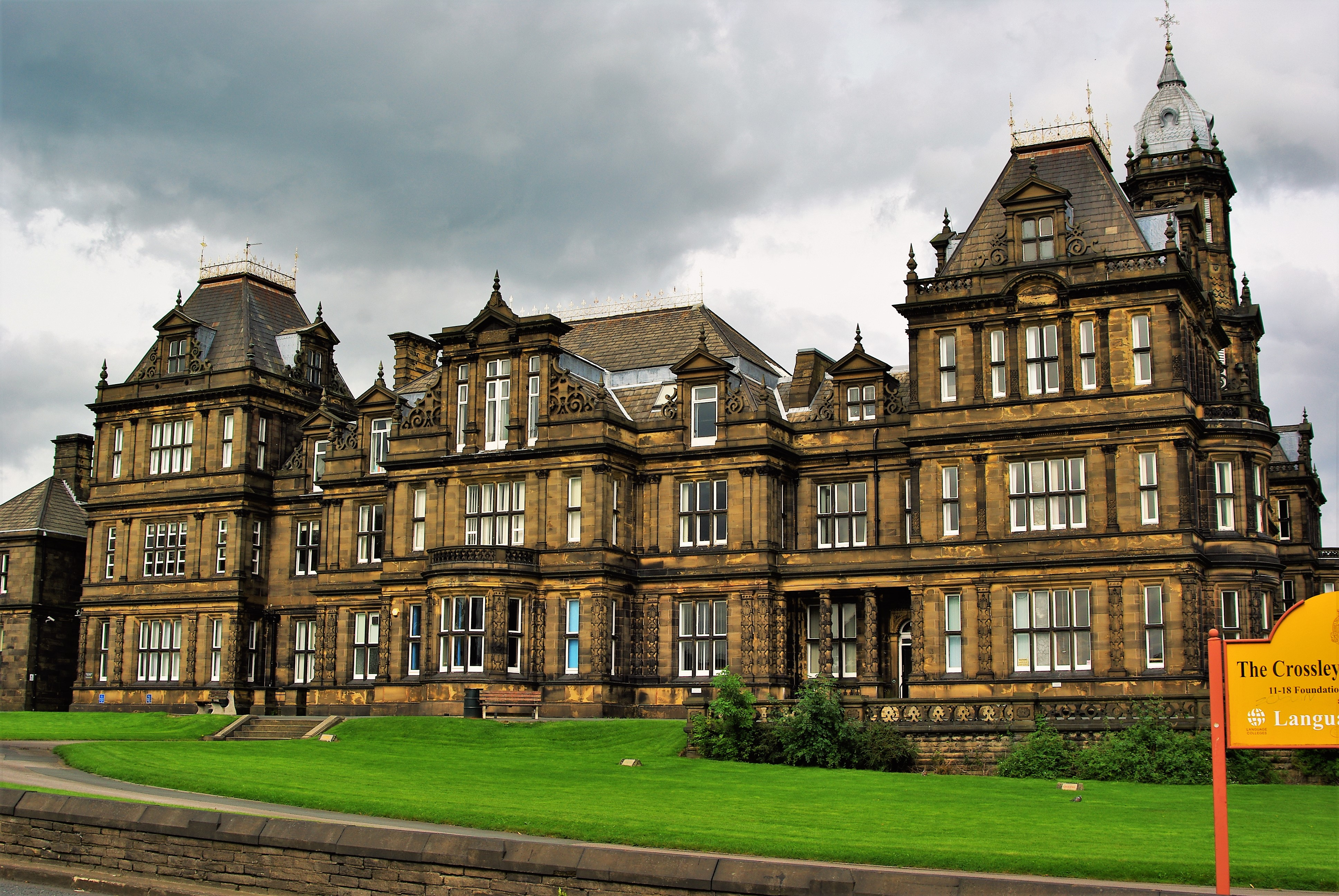
Crossley Heath School, a grammar school and sixth form in Halifax, West Yorkshire

Education or training is compulsory for all children aged 5 to 18. Students must stay in a traditional school setting until the age of 16. After this age they are required to continue in education or training until their 18th birthday, either through full-time further education, training through an apprenticeship, or working or volunteering while in part-time education or training. State-provided schooling and sixth-form education are paid for by taxes.

A child begins primary education during the school year they turn 5. Children between the ages of 3 and 5 are entitled to 600 hours per year of optional, state-funded, pre-school education. This can be provided in "playgroups", nurseries, community childcare centres or nursery classes in schools.

All children in England must currently therefore receive an effective education (at school or otherwise) from the first "prescribed day", which falls on or after their fifth birthday, and must remain in school until the last Friday in June of the school year in which they turn 16. The prescribed days are 31 August, 31 December and 31 March. The school year begins on 1 September (or 1 August if a term starts in August).

The compulsory stages of education are broken into a Foundation Stage (covering the last part of optional and first part of compulsory education), 4 Key Stages, and post-16 education, sometimes unofficially termed Key Stage Five, which takes a variety of different forms, including the sixth-form.

== Types of school ==
A number of different terms and names exist for the various schools and stages a pupil may go through during the compulsory part of their education. Grammar schools are selective schools, admitting children from 11 years old onward; they are normally state-funded, though fee paying independent grammars do exist. Schools offering nursery (pre-school) education commonly accept pupils from age 3; however, some schools do accept pupils younger than this.

Key stage	Year	Final exam	Age	State funded schools					State funded selective schools		Fee paying independent schools
Early Years	Nursery (or Pre-School)	None, though individual schools may set end of year tests.	3 to 4	Primary			Lower	Infant	Various 'gifted and talented' programmes within state and independent schools.		Pre-preparatory
Early Years	Reception (or Foundation)	None, though individual schools may set end of year tests.	4 to 5	Primary			Lower	Infant	Various 'gifted and talented' programmes within state and independent schools.		Pre-preparatory
KS1	Year 1	None, though individual schools may set end of year tests.	5 to 6	Primary			Lower	Infant	Various 'gifted and talented' programmes within state and independent schools.		Pre-preparatory
KS1	Year 2	None, though individual schools may set end of year tests.	6 to 7	Primary			Lower	Infant	Various 'gifted and talented' programmes within state and independent schools.		Pre-preparatory
KS2	Year 3	None, though individual schools may set end of year tests.	7 to 8	Primary			Lower	Junior	Various 'gifted and talented' programmes within state and independent schools.		Pre-preparatory
KS2	Year 4	None, though individual schools may set end of year tests.	8 to 9	Primary			Lower	Junior	Various 'gifted and talented' programmes within state and independent schools.		Preparatory or Junior
KS2	Year 5	None, though individual schools may set end of year tests.	9 to 10	Primary			Middle	Junior	Various 'gifted and talented' programmes within state and independent schools.		Preparatory or Junior
KS2	Year 6	National Curriculum assessments A grammar school entrance exam, often the 11-plus	10 to 11	Primary			Middle	Junior	Various 'gifted and talented' programmes within state and independent schools.		Preparatory or Junior
KS3	Year 7	None, though individual schools may set end of year tests, or mock GCSE exams.	11 to 12	Comprehensive or Secondary	Lower school		Middle	Comprehensive, Secondary or Senior	Grammar school and selective Academies		Preparatory or Junior
KS3	Year 8	None, though individual schools may set end of year tests, or mock GCSE exams.	12 to 13	Comprehensive or Secondary	Lower school		Middle	Comprehensive, Secondary or Senior	Grammar school and selective Academies		Preparatory or Junior
KS3	Year 9	None, though individual schools may set end of year tests, or mock GCSE exams.	13 to 14	Comprehensive or Secondary	Lower school		Upper	Comprehensive, Secondary or Senior	Grammar school and selective Academies		Senior (Public/Private school)
KS4	Year 10	None, though individual schools may set end of year tests, or mock GCSE exams.	14 to 15	Comprehensive or Secondary	University technical college	Upper school	Upper	Comprehensive, Secondary or Senior	Grammar school and selective Academies		Senior (Public/Private school)
KS4	Year 11	GCSE	15 to 16	Comprehensive or Secondary	University technical college	Upper school	Upper	Comprehensive, Secondary or Senior	Grammar school and selective Academies		Senior (Public/Private school)
KS5	Year 12	Advanced subsidiary level or school-set end of year tests.	16 to 17	Sixth form college	University technical college	Further education college		Comprehensive, Secondary or Senior	Grammar school and selective Academies	Maths school	Senior (Public/Private school)
KS5	Year 13	A-levels, T- levels, BTEC, International Baccalaureate, etc.	17 to 18	Sixth form college	University technical college	Further education college		Comprehensive, Secondary or Senior	Grammar school and selective Academies	Maths school	Senior (Public/Private school)

=== State-funded schools ===
Some 93% of children between the ages of 3 and 18 are in education in state-funded schools without charge (other than for activities such as swimming, cultural visits, theatre visits and field trips for which a voluntary payment can be requested, and limited charges at state-funded boarding schools).

All schools are legally required to have a website where they must publish details of their governance, finance, curriculum intent and staff and pupil protection policies.

Types of schools in England include:

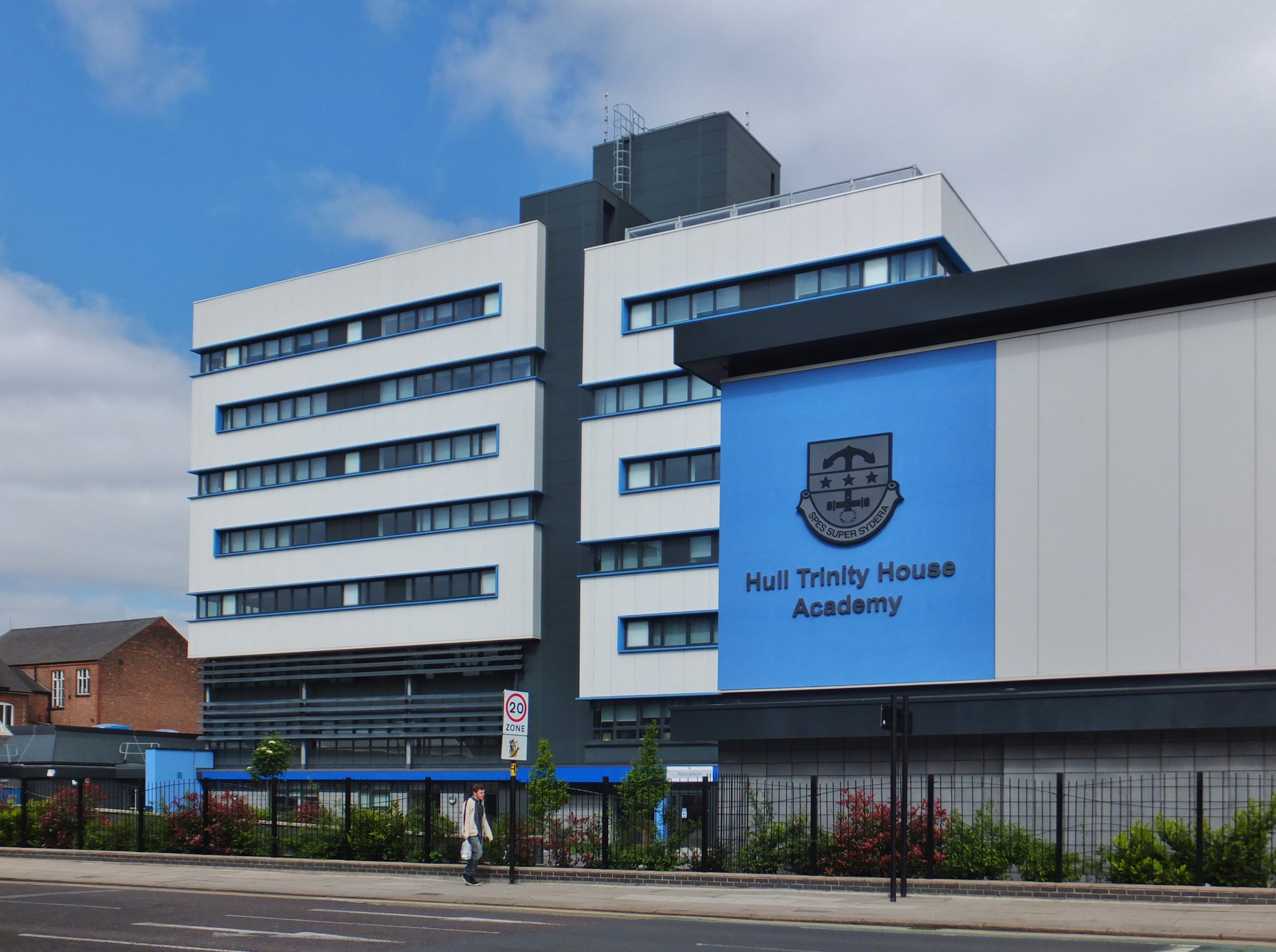
Hull Trinity House Academy, an example of an urban academy school in East Riding of Yorkshire

- Academy schools, established by the 1997-2010 Labour Government to replace poorly-performing community schools in areas of high social and economic deprivation. Their start-up costs are typically funded by private means, such as entrepreneurs or NGOs, with running costs met by central government and, like Foundation schools, are administratively free from direct local authority control. The 2010 Conservative-Liberal Democrat coalition government expanded the role of Academies in the Academy Programme. Some such schools operate selective entrance requirements for some of their entry, similar to grammar schools.
- Community schools, in which the local authority employs the schools' staff, owns the schools' lands and buildings, and has primary responsibility for admissions.
- Free schools, introduced by the Conservative-Liberal Democrat coalition, are newly established schools in England set up by parents, teachers, charities or businesses, where there is a perceived local need for more schools. They are funded by taxpayers, are academically non-selective and free to attend, and like Foundation schools and Academies, are not controlled by a local authority. They are ultimately accountable to the Secretary of State for Education. Free schools are an extension of the existing Academy Programme. The first 24 free schools opened in Autumn 2011.

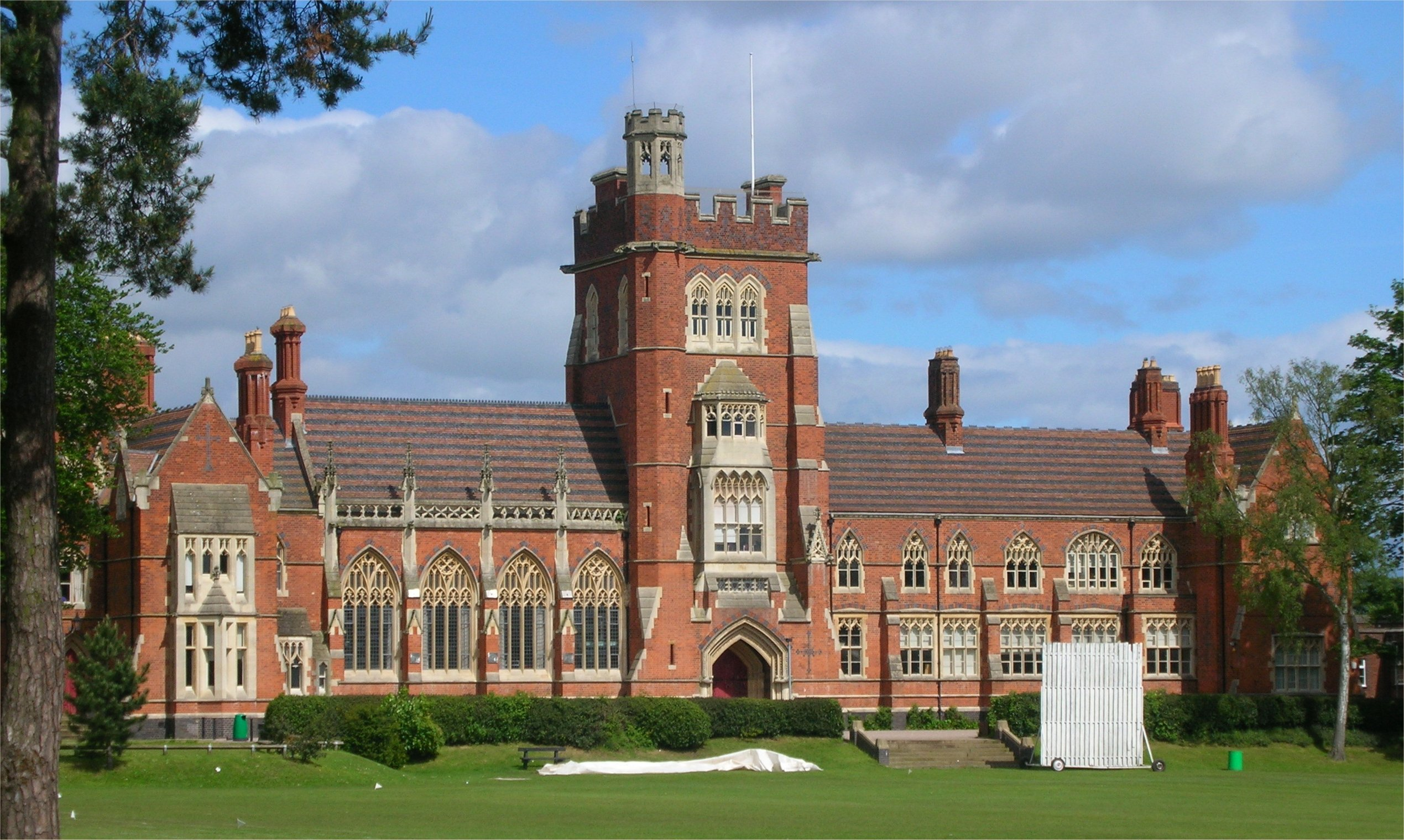
Moseley School, an example of a foundation school in Birmingham

- Foundation schools, in which the governing body employs the staff and has primary responsibility for admissions. School land and buildings are owned by the governing body or by a charitable foundation. The foundation appoints a minority of governors. Many of these schools were formerly grant maintained schools. In 2005 the Labour government proposed allowing all schools to become Foundation schools if they wished.
- Voluntary Aided schools, linked to a variety of organisations. They can be faith schools (about two thirds Church of England-affiliated; just under one third Roman Catholic Church, and a few another faith), or non-denominational schools, such as those linked to London Livery Companies. The charitable foundation contributes towards the capital costs of the school (typically 10%), and appoints a majority of the school governors. The governing body employs the staff and has primary responsibility for admissions.
- Voluntary Controlled schools, which are almost always faith schools, with the lands and buildings often owned by a charitable foundation. However, the local authority employs the schools' staff and has primary responsibility for admissions.
- University technical colleges (UTCs), introduced by the Conservative-Liberal Democrat coalition in 2010. These are sponsored by a university and have close ties to local business and industry. They are funded by the taxpayer, and are non-selective, free to attend and not controlled by a local authority. The university and industry partners support the curriculum development of the UTC, provide professional development opportunities for teachers, and guide suitably qualified students to industrial apprenticeships, foundation degrees or full degrees. The sponsor university appoints the majority of the UTC's governors and key members of staff. Pupils transfer to a UTC at the age of 14, part-way through their secondary education. The distinctive element of UTCs is that they offer technically oriented courses of study, combining National Curriculum requirements with technical and vocational elements. UTCs must specialise in subjects that require technical and modern equipment, but they also all teach business skills and the use of information and communications technology. UTCs are also supposed to offer clear routes into higher education or further learning in work.
- Maths schools were launched as selective specialist 16–19 schools in 2018, again sponsored by a university, following pilots with King's College London Mathematics School and Exeter Mathematics School.

In addition, three of the fifteen City Technology Colleges established in the 1980s still remain; the rest having converted to academies. These are state-funded all-ability secondary schools which charge no fees but which are independent of local authority control. There are also a small number of state-funded boarding schools.

English state-funded primary schools are almost all local schools with a small catchment area. More than half are owned by the Local Authority, though many are (nominally) voluntary controlled and some are voluntary aided. Some schools just include infants (aged 4 to 7) and some just juniors (aged 7 to 11). Some are linked, with automatic progression from the infant school to the junior school, and some are not. A few areas still have first schools for ages around 4 to 8 and middle schools for ages 8 or 9 to 12 or 13.

English secondary schools are mostly comprehensive (i.e. no entry exam), although the intake of comprehensive schools can vary widely, especially in urban areas with several local schools. Nearly 90% of state-funded secondary schools are specialist schools, receiving extra funding to develop one or more subjects (performing arts, arts, business, humanities, languages, science, mathematics, technology, engineering, etc.) in which the school specialises, which can select up to 10% of their intake for aptitude in the specialism. In areas children can enter a grammar school if they pass the eleven plus exam; there are also a number of isolated fully selective grammar schools and a few dozen partially selective schools. A significant minority of state-funded schools are faith schools, which are attached to religious groups, most often the Church of England or the Roman Catholic Church.

All state-funded schools are regularly inspected by the Office for Standards in Education, often known simply as Ofsted. Ofsted publishes reports on the quality of education, learning outcomes, management, and safety and behaviour of young people at a particular school on a regular basis. Schools judged by Ofsted to be providing an inadequate standard of education may be subject to special measures, which could include replacing the governing body and senior staff. School inspection reports are published online and directly sent to parents and guardians.

School uniforms are defined by individual schools, within the constraint that uniform regulations must not discriminate on the grounds of sex, race, disability, sexual orientation, gender reassignment, religion or belief. Schools may choose to permit trousers for girls or religious dress. Pupils aged five to seven in state-funded schools (including those in reception class) are entitled to free school meals and fruit. Pupils aged seven to 16 from low income families are eligible for free school meals. All school meals must follow the government's healthy eating standards and promote a healthy diet.

State-funded schools are encouraged to provide childcare outside of school hours, including breakfast clubs and after school curriculum activities (drama, computing, food preparation, arts, crafts, sports, science, etc.).

=== Private schools ===
Approximately 7% of school children in England attend privately run, fee-charging private schools. Some independent schools for 13–18-year-olds are known for historical reasons as 'public schools' and for 8–13-year-olds as 'prep schools'. Some schools offer scholarships for those with particular skills or aptitudes, or bursaries to allow students from less financially well-off families to attend. Independent schools do not have to follow the National Curriculum, and their teachers are not required or regulated by law to have official teaching qualifications. The Independent Schools Inspectorate (ISI) regularly publishes reports on the quality of education in independent schools that are members of the Independent Schools Council, while other independent schools in England are inspected by Ofsted.

=== Education by means other than schooling ===
The Education Act 1944 stated that parents are responsible for the education of their children, "by regular attendance at school or otherwise", which allows children to be educated at home. Officially referred to as "Elective Home Education", teaching ranges from structured homeschooling (using a school-style curriculum) to less-structured unschooling. Education Otherwise has supported parents who wished to educate their children outside school since the 1970s. The state provides no financial support to parents who choose to educate their children outside of school.

== Stages of compulsory education ==
=== Early years ===
In the early years foundation stage, the curriculum is organised into seven areas of learning:

- Communication and language
- Physical development
- Personal, social and emotional development
- Literacy
- Mathematics
- Understanding the world
- Expressive arts and design

=== National curriculum ===
The national curriculum covers pupils in primary school (ages 5 to 11; key stages 1 and 2) and secondary school (ages 11 to 16; key stages 3 and 4). It covers what subjects are taught and the standards children should reach in each subject.

State-funded schools in England are required to offer a curriculum which is balanced and broadly based, which promotes the spiritual, moral, cultural, mental and physical development of pupils at the school and of society, and which prepares pupils for the opportunities, responsibilities and experiences of later life.

State-funded schools are obliged to teach thirteen subjects, including the core English, Mathematics and Science. The structure of the National Curriculum is:

Subject	Key Stage 1 (age 5–7)	Key Stage 2 (age 7–11)	Key Stage 3 (age 11–14)	Key Stage 4 (age 14–16)
English				
Mathematics				
Science				
Art and Design				
Citizenship				
Computing				
Design and Technology				
Languages (Note: Entitled "Foreign Languages" in Key Stage 2, and "Modern Foreign Languages" in Key Stage 3.)				
Geography				
History				
Music				
Physical Education				
Religious Education				

Schools must provide Relationship and Sex Education and Personal, Social, Health and Economic education.

In addition to the compulsory subjects, students at Key Stage 4 have a statutory entitlement to be able to study at least one subject from the arts (comprising art and design, dance, music, photography, media studies, film studies, graphics, drama and media arts), design and technology (comprising design and technology, electronics, engineering, food preparation and nutrition), the humanities (comprising geography and history), business and enterprise (comprising business studies and economics) and a modern language.

=== Post-16 education ===
Compulsory schooling ends on the last Friday of June for pupils who will turn 16 before the start of the next school year. Most pupils at both state schools and independent schools will typically take GCSE examinations at the end of their last year of compulsory schooling.

After this, young people are mandated to continue in education until age 18, but need not attend a school. They can pursue further education, which includes technical education, in the sixth form of a school, in a specialised sixth form or further education college. Alternatively, they can take an apprenticeship or traineeship, or can volunteer for 20 or more hours a week while undertaking part-time education or training. Types of colleges that focus on education after sixteen include:

- Further education colleges
- Sixth form colleges
- Tertiary colleges
- Art, design and performing art colleges

==== Sixth form colleges / further education colleges ====
Students 16 and over typically study in the sixth form of a school (sixth form is a historical term for Years 12–13), in a separate sixth form college or further education college. Courses at FE colleges (referred to as further education courses) can also be studied by adults 18 and over. Colleges can offer a wide range of options for study, including apprenticeships and national qualifications such as:

- A-levels
- Business and Technology Education Council (BTEC)
- City and Guilds qualifications
- Cambridge International
- Cambridge Technicals
- International Baccalaureate (IB)
- National Vocational Qualifications (NVQs)
- T Levels
- V Levels
- WJEC Eduqas qualifications
- Functional Skills qualifications
- Skills for Life courses

==== Apprenticeships and traineeships ====
The National Apprenticeship Service helps people 16 or more years of age enter apprenticeships in order to learn a skilled trade. Traineeships are also overseen by the National Apprenticeship Service, and are education and a training programmes that are combined with work experience to give trainees the skills needed to get an apprenticeship.

T Levels are technical qualifications introduced in 2020, developed in collaboration with businesses and education providers to prepare students for skilled employment, apprenticeships and higher study. Every T Level includes an industry placement with an employer focused on developing the practical and technical skills required for an occupation.

== Higher education ==
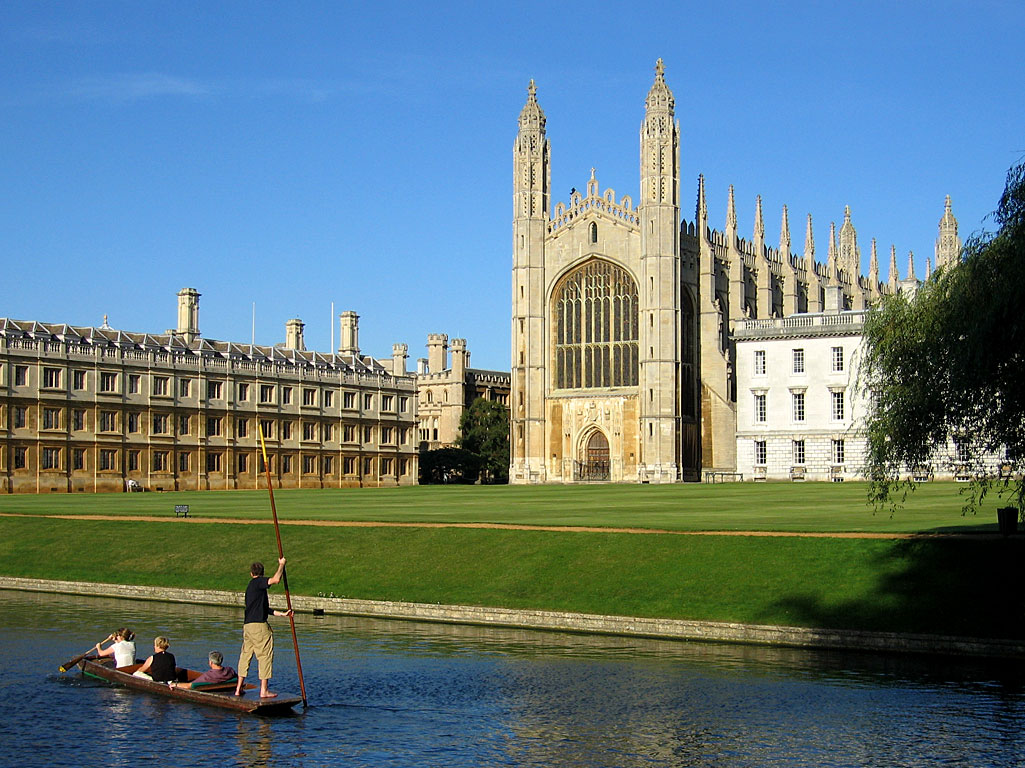
The chapel of King's College at the University of Cambridge, one of the ancient universities of England

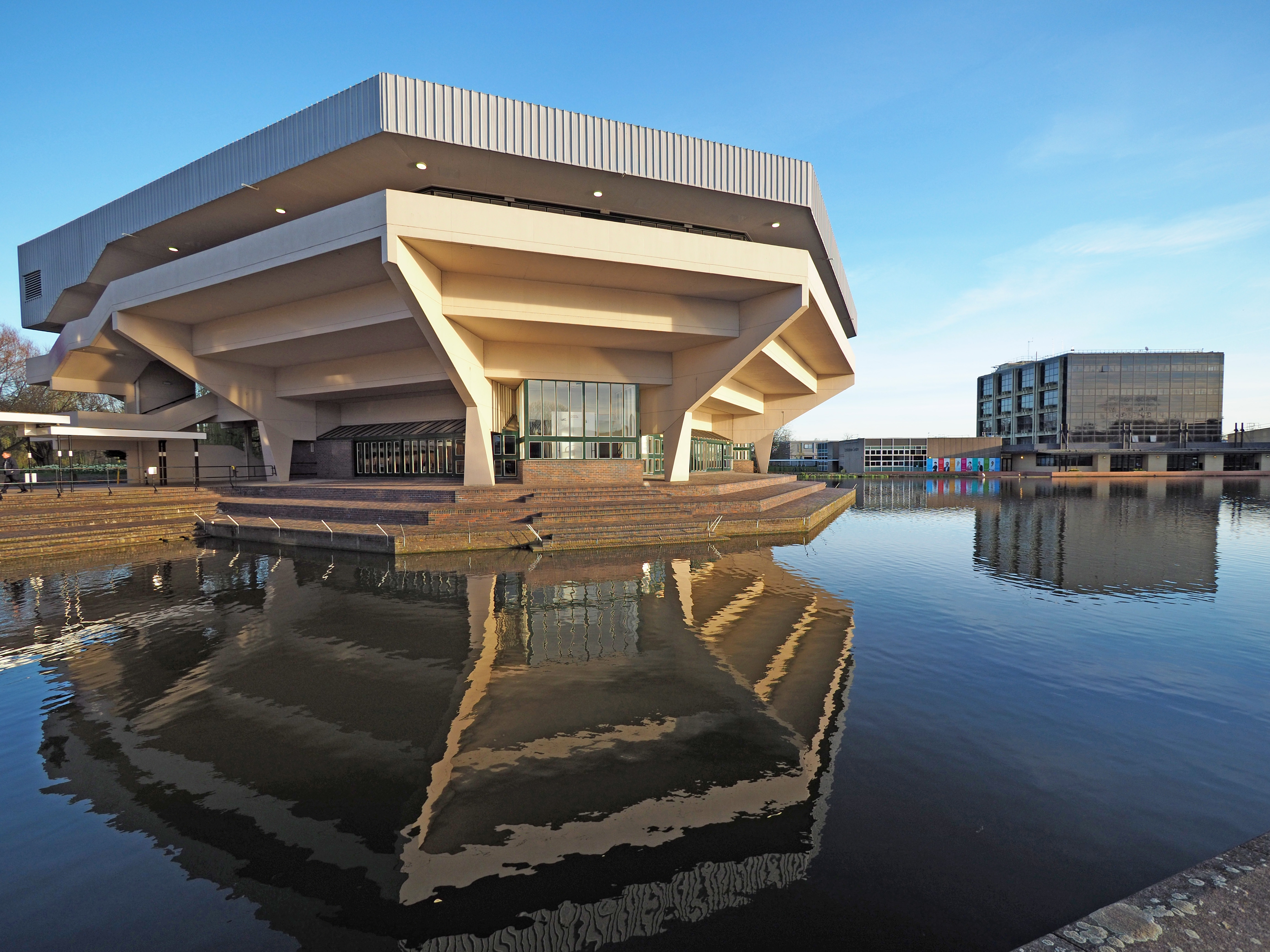
The Central Hall of the University of York, a plate glass university established in 1963

The Lanchester Library at Coventry University, a modern university that was granted university status in 1992

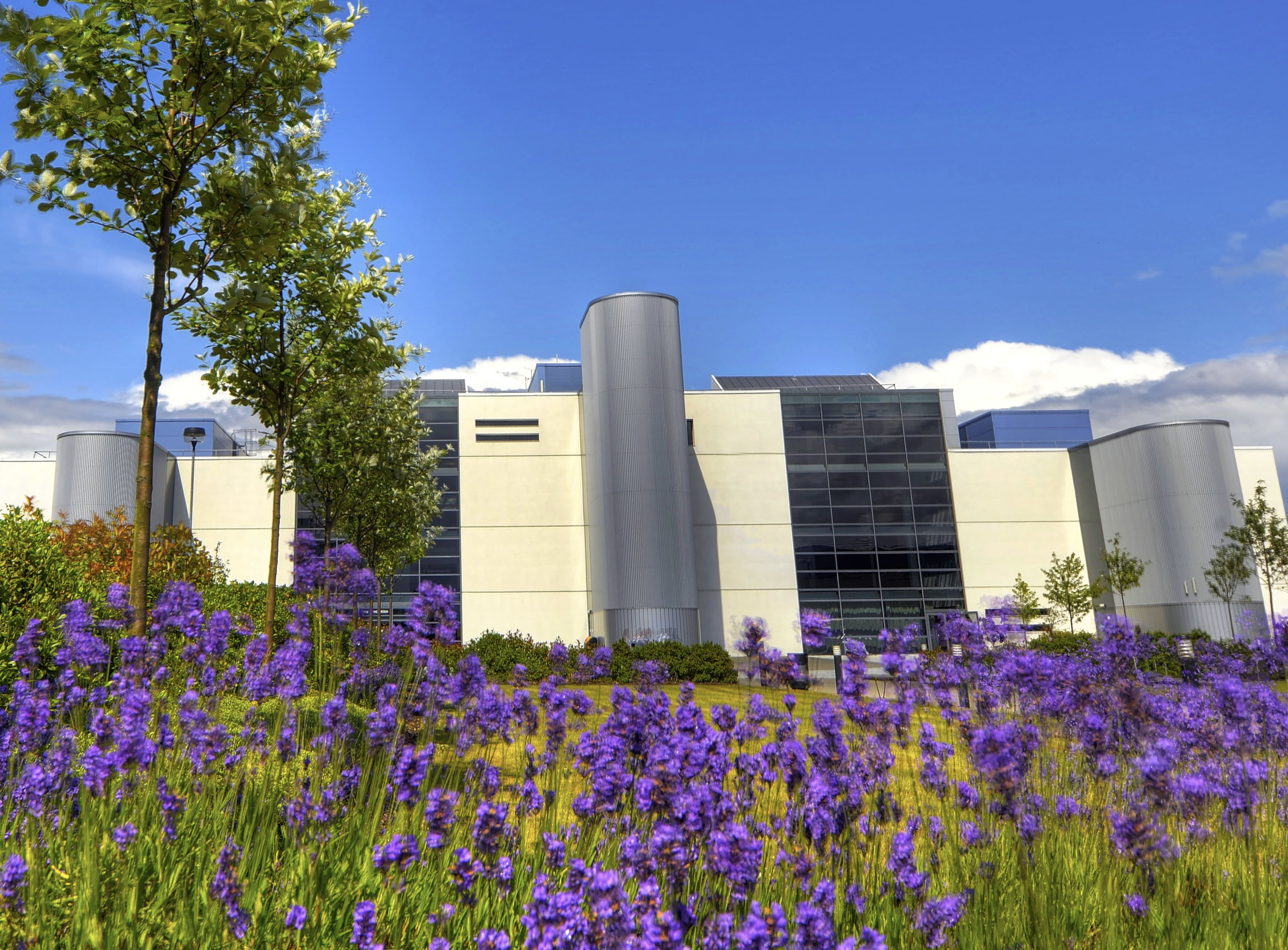
The campus of New College Durham, a college of further and higher education

Higher education in England is provided by Higher Education (HE) colleges, university colleges, universities and private colleges. Students normally enter higher education as undergraduates from age 18 onwards, and can study for a wide variety of vocational and academic qualifications, including certificates of higher education and higher national certificates at level 4, diplomas of higher education, higher national diplomas and foundation degrees at level 5, bachelor's degrees (normally with honours) at level 6, and integrated master's degrees and degrees in medicine, dentistry, and veterinary science at level 7.

Historically, undergraduate education outside a small number of private colleges and universities has been largely state-financed since the 1960s, with a contribution from top-up fees introduced in October 1998, however fees of up to £9,000 per annum have been charged from October 2012. There is a perceived hierarchy among universities, with the Russell Group seen as being composed of the country's more prestigious universities. League tables of universities are produced by private companies and generally cover the whole UK.

The state does not control university syllabuses, but it does influence admission procedures through the Office for Students (OfS), which approves and monitors access agreements to safeguard and promote fair access to higher education. The Quality Assurance Agency for Higher Education (QAA) is an independent expert quality body, with a remit to maintain and enhance the quality of teaching and learning in tertiary education in England. Unlike most degrees, the state has control over teacher training courses, and standards are monitored by Ofsted inspectors.

The typical first degree offered at English universities is the bachelor's degree with honours, which usually lasts for three years, although more vocational foundation degrees, typically lasting two years (or full-time equivalent) are also available in some institutions. Many institutions now offer integrated master's degrees, particularly in STEM subjects, as first degrees; these typically lasts for four years, the first three years running parallel to the bachelor's course in the subject. During a first degree students are known as undergraduates. The difference in fees between integrated and traditional postgraduate master's degrees (and that fees are capped at the first degree level for the former) makes taking an integrated master's degree as a first degree a more attractive option. Integrated master's degrees are often the standard route to chartered status for STEM professionals in England.

The majority of international students in the United Kingdom chose a British institution because of the country's reputation for high quality education, a far higher proportion than in Canada or Australia (just over 20 per cent) or the US (around 15 per cent). The University of Oxford and the University of Cambridge rank among the top 10 of the major global rankings. At some institutions in London such as the London School of Economics and University College London, the majority of first degree students are from outside the UK. Including postgraduates, international students are also in the majority at Imperial College London and University of the Arts London.

=== Postgraduate education ===
Students who have completed a first degree can apply for postgraduate and graduate courses. These include:

- Graduate certificates, graduate diplomas, professional graduate certificate in education – level 6 courses aimed at those who have already completed a bachelor's degree, often as conversion courses.
- Postgraduate certificates, postgraduate diplomas, postgraduate certificate in education – level 7 courses shorter than a full master's degree.
- Master's degrees (typically taken in one year, though research-based master's degrees may last for two) – taught or research degrees at level 7.
- Doctorates (typically taken in three years) – research degrees at level 8, the top level of the qualifications frameworks, often requiring a master's degree for entry. These may be purely research based (PhD/DPhil) or research and practice (professional doctorates). "New Route" PhDs, introduced in 2001, take at least 4 years and incorporate teaching at master's level.

=== Fees ===
Since October 1998, most undergraduates have paid fees repayable after graduation, contingent on attaining a certain level of income, with the state paying all fees for students from the poorest backgrounds. Only those who reach a certain salary threshold (£21,000) pay this fee through general taxation. In practice, higher education remains free at the point of entry in England for a high minority of students. English students are generally entitled to student loans for maintenance and living costs.

Students admitted from the academic year 2024-25 have paid tuition fees set at a maximum of up to £9,535 per annum. Fees for international students vary but are generally higher. Depending on the discipline and university, Master's degrees can cost between £10,000 and £35,000. There are numerous bursaries (awarded to low income applicants) to offset undergraduate fees and, for postgraduates, full scholarships are available for most subjects, and are usually awarded competitively.

The gap between rich and poor students has narrowed since the introduction of the higher fees. This may be because universities have used tuition fees to invest in bursaries and outreach schemes. In 2016, The Guardian noted that the number of disadvantaged students applying to university had increased by 72% from 2006 to 2015, a bigger rise than in Scotland, Wales or Northern Ireland.

A study by the Centre for Economic Performance found that the introduction of tuition fees had "increased funding per head, educational standards, rising enrolments, and a narrowing of the participation gap between advantaged and disadvantaged students".

== Adult education ==
Adult education, continuing education or lifelong learning is offered to students of all ages. This can include the vocational qualifications mentioned above, and also:

- One or two year access courses, to allow adults without suitable qualifications access to university.
- A number of universities, such as the Open University, offer undergraduate and postgraduate distance learning programmes.
- The Workers' Educational Association offers large number of semi-recreational courses, with or without qualifications, made available by Local Education Authorities under the guise of Adult Education. Courses are available in a wide variety of areas, such as arts & crafts, life skills and languages.

== National qualifications frameworks ==
The two qualifications frameworks in England are the Regulated Qualifications Framework (RQF), for qualifications regulated by Ofqual, and the Framework for Higher Education Qualifications (FHEQ) for qualifications granted by bodies with degree awarding powers, overseen by the Quality Assurance Agency. These share a common numbering scheme for their levels, which was also used for the earlier Qualifications and Credit Framework. The RQF is linked to the European Qualifications Framework (EQF) and the FHEQ to the Qualifications Framework of the European Higher Education Area (QF-EHEA).

RQF/FHEQ level	Common qualifications	EQF/QF-EHEA equivalent
Level 1	Foundation diploma GCSE (grades D–G/4-1); NVQ level 1	EQF level 2
Level 2	Higher diploma GCSE (grades A*–C/9-5); NVQ level 2	EQF level 3
Level 3	Advanced diploma A-level; International Baccalaureate; BTEC National; NVQ level 3	EQF level 4
Level 4	Certificate of Higher Education; HNC (awarded by a degree-awarding institution)	QF-EHEA Intermediate qualifications within the Short Cycle
Level 4	BTEC Professional award, certificate and diploma level 4 Higher National Certificate (HNC); NVQ level 4	EQF level 5
Level 5	BTEC Professional award, certificate and diploma level 5 Higher National Diploma (HND); NVQ level 4	EQF level 5
Level 5	Diploma of Higher Education; Foundation degree HND (awarded by a degree-awarding institution)	QF-EHEA Short Cycle (within or linked to first cycle)
Level 6	BTEC Advanced Professional award, certificate and diploma level 6 NVQ level 4	EQF level 6
Level 6	Graduate certificate Graduate diploma Professional Graduate Certificate of Education	QF-EHEA Intermediate qualifications within the First Cycle
Level 6	Ordinary bachelor's degree Bachelor's degree with honours	QF-EHEA First Cycle (end of cycle)
Level 7	BTEC Advanced Professional award, certificate and diploma level 7 NVQ level 5	EQF level 7
Level 7	Postgraduate certificate Postgraduate diploma Postgraduate Certificate of Education	QF-EHEA Intermediate qualifications within the Second Cycle
Level 7	Integrated master's degree Master's degree	QF-EHEA Second Cycle (end of cycle)
Level 8	NVQ level 5	EQF level 8
Level 8	Doctorates	QF-EHEA Third Cycle (end of cycle)

== Standards ==
The Programme for International Student Assessment coordinated by the OECD currently ranks the overall knowledge and skills of British 15-year-olds as thirteenth in the world in literacy, mathematics, and science with the average British student scoring 503.7, well above the OECD average of 493. Primary school children in England were ranked fourth in the Progress in International Reading Literacy Study for reading and literacy skills in 2021.

The United Nations ranks the UK seventh in the Education Index, measuring educational attainment, GDP per capita and life expectancy, ahead most of Europe. From 1997 to 2010, the Labour government introduced city academies in areas of social and economic deprivation. More former local authority schools, deemed inadequate or requiring improvement by inspectors, transitioned to an academy trust are now rated good or outstanding.

Academies were established in most disadvantaged areas, they are the key element in the drive to raise standards; raising aspirations and creating opportunity in some of the most disadvantaged communities. By 2015, more students were in good and outstanding rated schools from all social backgrounds than 2010. This growth in the academy system coincides with the improvement across schools in England, with 88% of all schools rated good or outstanding, an improvement from 68% in August 2010.

== Funding ==
Since 2018, English schools have been funded through a national formula. In August 2019, it was announced that the budget for schools and high needs would be increased by 6% (£2.6 billion) in 2020–21, £4.8 billion in 2021-22 and £7.1 billion in 2022-23 respectively – plus an extra £1.5 billion per year to fund additional pensions costs for teachers. This new funding includes £780 million in 2020–21 to support children with Special Educational Needs and Disabilities (SEND).

== See also ==
- Skills England
- Oak National Academy
- Education in the United Kingdom
- British Schools Foundation
- Research England
- School uniforms in England
- Science Learning Centres
- Science education in England
- List of universities in England
- List of schools in England
