= British undergraduate degree classification =

Academic grading structure in the United Kingdom

The British undergraduate degree classification system is a grading structure used for undergraduate degrees or bachelor's degrees and integrated master's degrees in the United Kingdom. The system has been applied, sometimes with significant variation, in other countries and regions.

The UK's university degree classification system, established in 1918, serves to recognize academic achievement beyond examination performance. Bachelor's degrees in the UK can either be honours or ordinary degrees, with honours degrees classified into first class, upper second class (2:1), lower second class (2:2), and third class based on weighted averages of marks. The specific thresholds for these classifications can vary by institution. Integrated master's degrees follow a similar classification, and there is some room for discretion in awarding final classifications based on a student's overall performance and work quality.

The honours degree system has been subject to scrutiny owing to significant shifts in the distribution of classifications, leading to calls for reform. Concerns over grade inflation have been observed. The Higher Education Statistics Agency has documented changes, noting an increase in the proportion of first-class and upper second-class honours degrees awarded; the percentage of first-class honours increased from 7% in 1997 to 26% in 2017. Critics argue this trend, driven partly by institutional pressures to maintain high league table rankings, dilutes the value of higher education and undermines public confidence. Despite improvements in teaching and student motivation contributing to higher grades, there is a sentiment that achieving a first or upper second is no longer sufficient for securing desirable employment, pushing students towards extracurricular activities to enhance their curriculum vitae. The system affects progression to postgraduate education, with most courses requiring at least a 2:1, although work experience and additional qualifications can sometimes compensate for lower classifications.

In comparison to international grading systems, the UK's classifications have equivalents in various countries, adapting to different academic cultures and grading scales. The ongoing debate over grade inflation and its implications for the UK's higher education landscape reflect broader concerns about maintaining academic standards and the value of university degrees in an increasingly competitive job market.

== History ==
The classification system used in the United Kingdom reached its current form in 1918. Honours were then a means to recognise individuals who demonstrated depth of knowledge or originality, as opposed to relative achievement in examination conditions.

It was claimed by The New Statesman in 2019 that academics were under increasing pressure from administrators to award students good marks and grades with little regard for those students' actual abilities, in order to maintain their league table rankings. A report by the Reform think tank in 2018 found that the percentage of graduates who received first-class honours had grown from 7% in 1997 to 26% in 2017, with the rate of growth sharply accelerating toward the end of this period. A 2018 study by the UK Standing Committee for Quality Assessment did not find conclusive evidence that either grade inflation or genuine improvement in student outcomes was behind the upward trend in student grades. However, it did find that the upward trend meant that British undergraduate degree classifications would become less useful to students and employers, and that it might undermine public confidence in the overall value of higher education.

== Degree classification ==
A bachelor's degree can be an honours degree (bachelor's with honours) or an ordinary degree (bachelor's without honours). Honours degrees are classified, usually based on a weighted average (with higher weight given to marks in the later years of the course, and often zero weight to those in the first year) of the marks gained in exams and other assessments. While grade boundaries are defined by institutions, there are well-defined conventional values that are generally followed:

- First-class honours (1st, 1 or I) – 70% or higher
- Second-class honours:
  - Upper division (2:1, 2i or II-1) – 60–69%
  - Lower division (2:2, 2ii or II-2) – 50–59%
- Third-class honours (3rd, 3 or III) – 40–49%

Students who do not achieve honours may be awarded an ordinary degree, sometimes known as a "pass". Ordinary degrees, and other exit awards such as the Diploma of Higher Education (DipHE; for completing the first two years of a degree course) and Certificate of Higher Education (CertHE; for completing the first year of a degree course), may be unclassified (pass/fail) or, particularly in Scotland where the ordinary degree is offered as a qualification in its own right, classified into pass, merit and distinction.

Integrated master's degrees are usually classified with honours in the same way as a bachelor's honours degree, although some integrated master's degrees are classified like postgraduate taught master's degrees or foundation degrees into:

- Distinction – typically 70% and higher
- Merit – typically 60–69%
- Pass – typically 50–59%.

At most institutions, the system allows a small amount of discretion. A candidate may be elevated to the next degree class if their average marks are close to (or the median of their weighted marks achieves) the higher class, and if they have submitted several pieces of work worthy of the higher class. However, even students with a high average mark may be unable to take honours if they have failed part of the course and so have insufficient credits.

In England, Wales and Northern Ireland, a bachelor's degree with honours normally takes three years of full-time study and usually requires 360 credits, of which at least 90 are at level 6 (final year of a bachelor's degree) level, while an ordinary bachelor's degree normally requires 300 credits, of which 60 are at level 6. In Scotland, the honours bachelor's degree takes four years and requires 480 credits with a minimum of 90 at level 10 of the Scottish framework (last year of the honours degree) and 90 at level 9 (penultimate year), while the ordinary degree takes three years and requires 360 credits with a minimum of 60 at level 9 (last year of the ordinary degree).

In Scotland, it is possible to start university a year younger than in the rest of the United Kingdom, as the Scottish Higher exams are often taken at age 16 or 17 (as opposed to 18), so Scottish students often end a four-year course at the same age as a student from elsewhere in the UK taking a three-year course, assuming no gap years or students skipping the first year (direct entry to 2nd year).

When a candidate is awarded a degree with honours, "(Hons)" may be suffixed to their designatory letters – e.g. BA (Hons), BSc (Hons), BMus (Hons), MA (Hons). An MA (Hons) would generally indicate the bachelor's-level Scottish MA awarded by some Scottish universities, while other master's degrees awarded with honours would normally indicate an integrated master's degree at master's level.

=== Distribution of classes ===
The Higher Education Statistics Agency (HESA) has published the number of degrees awarded with different classifications since 1994–1995. The relative proportions of different classes have changed over this period, with increasing numbers of students being awarded higher honours. The table below shows the percentage of classified degrees (i.e., not including fails or unclassified degrees such as MBBS) in each class at five-year intervals; note that HESA stopped giving statistics separately for third-class honours and pass degree after 2003.

Class	1994/95	1999/2000	2004/05	2009/10	2014/15	2015/16	2016/17	2017/18	2018/19	2019/20	2020/21	2021/22
1st	7%	8%	12%	14%	22%	23%	26%	28%	28%	35%	36%	32%
2:1	40%	43%	47%	48%	49%	49%	49%	48%	48%	47%	46%	46%
2:2	35%	34%	33%	30%	23%	22%	20%	19%	19%	15%	14%	17%
3rd	6%	5%	8%	8%	6%	5%	5%	5%	4%	3%	3%	4%
Pass	12%	10%	8%	8%	6%	5%	5%	5%	4%	3%	3%	4%

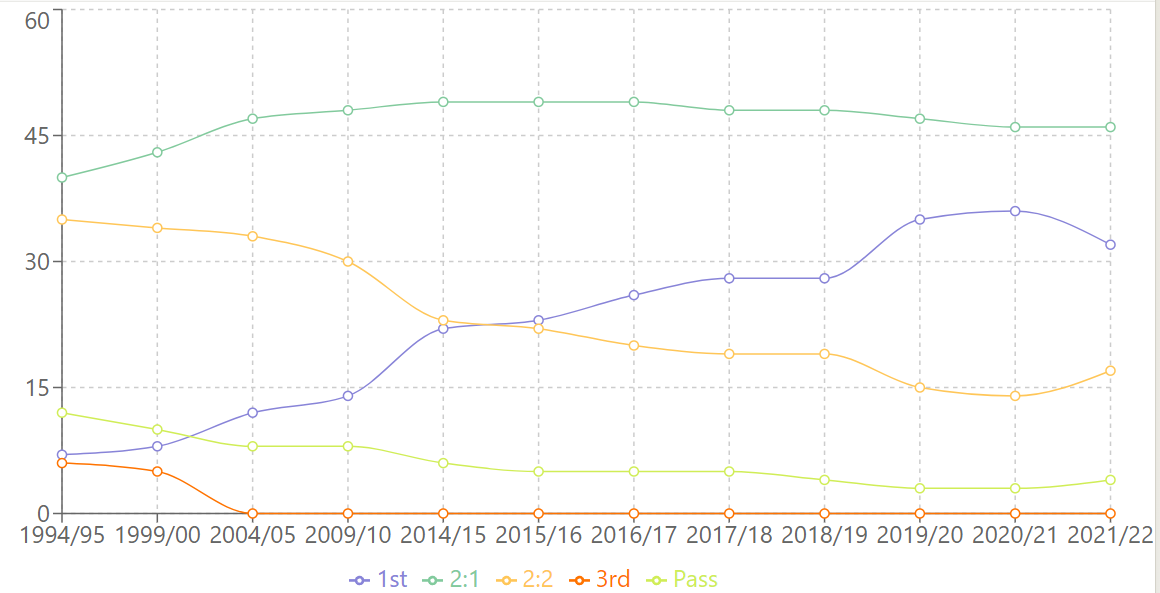
United Kingdom degree classification trends line chart

=== First-class honours ===
Proportion of first class
Year	Awarded
1995	7%
2005	12%
2015	22%
2022	32%

First-class honours, referred to as a "first", is the highest honours classification and indicates high academic achievement. Historically, first-class honours were uncommon, but since 2019 a first has been awarded to nearly thirty percent of graduates of British universities. The increase is said by some commentators to be due to student-demanded grade inflation rather than an improvement in students' academic ability.

In the early 1990s, first-class honours went to about 7% of graduates, or about one student in 15. The percentages of graduates achieving a first vary greatly by university and course studied. Students of law are least likely to gain a first, while students of mathematical sciences are most likely to gain a first.

A first-class honours degree is sometimes colloquially referred to in rhyming slang as a "Geoff" after Geoff Hurst, the English 1966 FIFA World Cup footballer.

=== Upper second-class honours ===
The upper division is commonly abbreviated to "2:1" or "II.i" (pronounced two-one). The 2:1 is a minimum requirement for entry to many postgraduate courses in the UK. It is also required for the award of a research council postgraduate studentship in the UK, although a combination of qualifications and experience equal to a 2:1 is also acceptable. This is often interpreted as possession of a master's degree (sometimes at merit level or above) in addition to a 2:2 undergraduate degree.

The percentage of candidates who achieve upper second-class honours can vary widely by degree subject, as well as by university.

A 2:1 degree ("two-one") is sometimes referred to as an "Attila" (after Attila the Hun) or a "Trevor Nunn" in rhyming slang in the UK.

Until 1986, the University of Oxford did not distinguish between upper and lower second-class degrees.

=== Lower second-class honours ===
This is the lower division of second-class degrees and is abbreviated as "2:2" or '"II.ii" (pronounced two-two) and is sometimes referred to as a "Desmond" (after Desmond Tutu).

=== Third-class honours ===
Third-class honours, commonly referred to as a "third", is the lowest honours classification in most UK universities. Informally, it is referred to as a "gentleman's third" (cf. the "gentleman's C" in US parlance).

Approximately 3–5% of UK students graduating between 2018 and 2022 were awarded thirds.

=== Ordinary degree ===
While most university bachelor's degree courses lead to honours degrees, some universities offer courses leading to ordinary degrees. Some honours courses permit students who do not gain sufficient credits in a year by a small margin to transfer to a parallel ordinary degree course. Ordinary degrees may also sometimes be awarded to honours degree students who do not pass sufficient credits in their final year to gain an honours degree, but pass enough to earn an ordinary degree.

Some Scottish universities offer three-year ordinary degrees as a qualification in their own right, as well as an honours degree over four years. This is in contrast to English universities that have honours degrees with three years of study. An ordinary degree in Scotland is not a failed honours degree, as in certain English universities. Students can decide, usually at the end of their second or third year, whether or not they wish to complete a fourth honours year. Scottish universities may also award their ordinary degrees with distinction if a student achieves a particularly good grade average, usually 70% or above. A common example of a Scottish ordinary degree is the Bachelor of Laws course taken by graduates of other subjects, as this is sufficient (without honours) for entry into the legal profession.

Until the 1970s the University of Oxford awarded a fourth-class degree as an equivalent of the ordinary degree.

=== Aegrotat ===
An aegrotat (/ˈiːɡroʊtæt/; from Latin aegrotat 'he/she is ill') degree is an honours or ordinary degree without classification, awarded to a candidate who was unable to undertake their exams due to illness or even death, under the presumption that, had they completed those exams, they would have satisfied the standard required for that degree. Aegrotat degrees are often qualified with an appended "(aegrotat)". Following the introduction of new regulations regarding mitigating circumstances, aegrotat degrees are less commonly awarded.

=== Incorporation of prior learning ===
Degrees may be granted which incorporate prior learning, such as by means of CATS points transfer. Where the substance of incorporated credit exceeds a given threshold, the granting institution may be unable to grade sufficient work to award a degree classification. Any degree granted may then be unclassified.

=== Variations in classification ===
A double first is a degree with first-class honours in two different subjects. This arose in Oxford in the 19th century, where it referred specifically to honours in classics and mathematics (the original two honours schools).

At the University of Cambridge, undergraduate tripos examinations are split into one or more parts, which span either one or two years. Until October 2020, the official classification was separate for every part of the degree, not for the overall degree, and attaining first-class honours in two parts was referred to as a "double first". For students who began their course of study in October 2020 or later, a final class is awarded across the course of study as well as for each part. It is possible in some triposes to be awarded a "starred first", for examination scripts that "exhibit the qualities of first-class answers to an exceptional degree". Some Cambridge alumni have been described by their colleges and others as having achieved a "triple first".

At the University of Oxford, honours degrees were divided into first, second, third and fourth class until the 1970s, when Oxford began to adopt the classification system used by other British universities. Oxford sometimes grants a congratulatory first, which The New York Times described as "a highly unusual honor in which the examining professors ask no questions about the candidate's written work but simply stand and applaud". Martin Amis described it as "the sort where you are called in for a viva and the examiners tell you how much they enjoyed reading your papers".

Some institutions, such as University College London, Oxford Brookes University and Imperial College London have a "dean's list". Criteria for these vary and may, depending on the institution, include factors other than academic performance.

=== Frameworks ===
Degrees in the UK are mapped to levels of the Frameworks for Higher Education Qualifications of UK Degree-Awarding Bodies (FHEQ), which includes the Framework for Qualifications of Higher Education Institutes in Scotland (FQHEIS), which has an alternative numbering of levels corresponding to those of the Scottish Credit and Qualifications Framework (SCQF). Bachelor's degrees (including the Scottish MA, but not including medical degrees, dentistry degrees or degrees in veterinary science) attained in the UK are at FHEQ level 6/FQHEIS level 9 (ordinary) or 10 (honours); master's degrees (including integrated master's degrees and first degrees in medicine, dentistry and veterinary science) are at FHEQ level 7/FQHEIS level 11, and doctoral degrees are at FHEQ level 8/FQHEIS level 12. Bachelor's, master's and doctoral degrees map to first, second and third cycle qualifications in the Framework for Qualifications of the European Higher Education Area.

== International comparisons ==
=== Greece ===
The table below depicts the Greek grading system while illustrating approximately how the grades are compared with ECTS and UK grades:

British class	Greek equivalent
First (1st)	8.5+
Upper Second (2:1)	6.5+
Lower Second (2:2)	5+
Third-Class (3rd)	No assessment/award at the end of 4th or 5th year, until all modules, from all years, are passed successfully. Years are extended.

=== France ===
King's College London gives equivalencies between French and British grades for postgraduate admission, as does the University of St Andrews for its study-abroad programme. Equivalencies for the purposes of initial teacher training have also been derived by the UK NARIC for 1st, 2:1 and 2:2 degrees.

British class	French grade range		
British class	King's College London	St Andrews	UK NARIC
First	14+ (Très bien; Bien)	15–20 (Très bien; upper Bien)	16+ (Très bien)
Upper Second	12–13.99 (Assez bien)	12–14.99 (lower Bien; Assez bien)	13+ (Bien; upper Assez bien)
Lower Second	11–11.99 (upper Passable)	10–11.99 (Passable)	12+ (lower Assez bien)
Third	–	7–9.99 (Echec/ajourné)	–
Pass	–	6–6.99 (Echec/ajourné)	–

=== South Africa ===
The South African Qualifications Authority (SAQA) compares international degrees with local degrees before any international student continues their studies in that country. While the British degree accreditation and classification system allows students to go straight from a three-year bachelor's degree onto a master's degree (normally requiring a 1st or a 2:1 – those with a 2:2 or a 3rd usually require appropriate professional experience), South Africa does not do so unless the student has proven research capabilities. South African Honours degrees prepare the students to undertake a research-specific degree (in terms of master's), by spending an in-depth year (up to five modules) creating research proposals and undertaking a research project of limited scope. This prepares students for the research degrees later in their academic career.

=== Spain ===
The UK NARIC has derived equivalencies for the grades of the Spanish grado and licenciatura degrees for purposes of initial teacher training bursaries.

British class	Spanish equivalent
First	8.5+
Upper Second	7+
Lower Second	6 +

=== The Netherlands ===
The Netherlands organisation for international cooperation in higher education (NUFFIC) has compared UK degree classification to Dutch degree grades. Dutch equivalencies have also been calculated by the UK NARIC.

British class	Dutch equivalent	
British class	NUFFIC	UK NARIC
First	8–10	8.5+
Upper Second	7 to 8	6.5+
Lower Second	6 to 7	6+
Third	5.5 to 6	–

NUFFIC also noted that the grading culture is different in the Netherlands, so that it is very rare for even the best students in the Netherlands to be awarded a 9 or a 10, which represent near perfection and absolute perfection, respectively.

=== United States ===
US comparison services treat English three-year bachelor's degrees and American four-year bachelor's degrees as equivalent. Some British sources, such as the Dearing Report, consider British honours degrees equivalent to a US master's degree and US bachelor's degrees as equivalent to British pass degrees in terms of the standard reached in the major subject, due to the higher degree of specialisation in the UK. However, British institutions generally accept US bachelor's degrees for admission to postgraduate study (see below).

In comparing US bachelor's degrees to British honours degrees, equivalencies can be expressed in terms of either US grade point averages (GPAs) or letter grades. British institutions normally state equivalence in terms of GPAs. Approximate mappings between British classifications and GPAs can be inferred from the graduate admissions criteria used by British universities, which often give international equivalents. For example, University College London (UCL) equates the minimum classification for entrance to GPAs using 2:1 = 3.3 and 2:2 = 3.0. Different universities convert grades differently: the London School of Economics and Political Science (LSE) considers a GPA of 3.5 or better as equivalent to gaining a 2:1, while the department of English Language and Literature at Oxford considers a GPA of "about 3.8" equivalent to a first-class degree. Similarly, the UK NARIC gives equivalent GPAs for determining eligibility for teacher training bursaries. Durham University's North American Undergraduate Guide gives a conversion table as a guide to understanding British classifications (rather than for admission to postgraduate study) of 1st = 3.8–4.0, 2:1 = 3.3–3.7, 2:2 = 2.8–3.2 and 3rd = 2.3–2.7. The GPA conversions are summarised in the following table:

British degree classification	US GPA Equivalent			
British degree classification	UCL	Durham	NARIC	Other
First	–	3.8–4.0	3.7+	3.8+ (Oxford)
Upper Second	3.3+	3.3–3.7	3.2+	3.5+ (LSE)
Lower Second	3.0+	2.8–3.2	2.6+	–
Third	–	2.3–2.7	–	–

Letter grade equivalents are more commonly used by American institutions. World Education Services (WES), a nonprofit organisation which provides qualification conversion services to many universities and employers, gives 1st = A, 2:1 = A−/B+, 2:2 = B, 3rd = B−, Pass = C. The Fulbright Commission has also created "an unofficial chart with approximate grade conversions between UK results and US GPA". The table below summarises these conversions, including GPA equivalents for the WES grades given using the letter grade to GPA conversion of Duke University.

British degree classification	US equivalents (Fulbright)		US Grade Equivalent (WES)	Equivalent GPA to WES Grades (using Duke conversion)
British degree classification	Grade	GPA	US Grade Equivalent (WES)	Equivalent GPA to WES Grades (using Duke conversion)
First	A	4.00	A	4.0
Upper Second	A−/B+	3.33–3.67	A−/B+	3.7/3.3
Lower Second	B	3.00	B	3.0
Third	C+	2.30	B−	2.7
Pass	C	2.00	C	2.0

=== Canada ===
Canadian academic grades may be given as letters, percentages, 12-point GPAs or 4-point GPAs. The 4-point GPAs are sometimes seen to differ from the US but other sources treat them as equivalent. The Durham conversion specifies GPAs for the US and letter grades/percentages for Canada while the UK NARIC has separate GPA conversions for the four-year bachelor's honours, baccalauréat and professional bachelor's degrees (which differ from their US GPA equivalents by at most 0.1) and the three-year bachelor's degree (which is seen as a lower standard). The British Graduate Admissions Fact Sheet from McGill University uses the conversion 1st = 4.0; 2:1 = 3.0; 2:2 = 2.7; 3rd = 2.0; Pass = 1.0; Fail = 0.0.

British degree classification	Canadian equivalent (Durham)		Canadian GPA equivalent (NARIC)								Canadian GPA equivalent (McGill)
British degree classification	Canadian equivalent (Durham)		4-year (Bachelor Honours degree)				3-year (Bachelor's degree)				Canadian GPA equivalent (McGill)
British degree classification	%	Letter	GPA	%	Letter	12-point	GPA	%	Letter	12-point	Canadian GPA equivalent (McGill)
First	85%+	A to A+	3.7+	83%	A−	10	3.9+	90%	A	12	4.0
Upper Second	77% – 84%	B+ to A−	3.1+	73%	B	8	3.5+	80%	B+	10	3.0
Lower Second	67% – 76%	C+ to B−	2.5	62%	C+	6	3.1	73%	B	8	2.7
Third	60% - 66%	–	–				–				2.0
Pass	–		–				–				1.0

=== Australia ===
Some universities, such as those in Australia, offer poll degrees (for instance, as a three-year BA or a three-year BSc) by default. The terms "ordinary" or "pass" are not used. High-achieving students may be recognised with an honours classification without further coursework or research, as is often the case in engineering (which often contains a research and thesis component) or law. However, other courses (such as humanities, arts, social sciences, and sciences) and other universities may recognise high-achieving students with an honours classification with further coursework or research, undertaken either concurrently with, and as part of or in addition to, a bachelor's course, or after completion of a bachelor's course requirements and attaining adequately competitive grades.

Some graduate degrees have been or are classified; however, under the Australian Qualifications Framework (AQF), no graduate-level degrees (i.e., master's by coursework, master's by research, or higher research degrees) may be classified. To comply with this standard, some institutions have commenced, or will commence, offering high-achieving graduates with "distinction". Notably, this is consistent with British graduate degree classification.

== Progression to postgraduate study ==
Regulations governing the progression of undergraduate degree graduates to postgraduate programmes vary among universities, and are often flexible. A candidate for a postgraduate master's degree is usually required to have at least a 2:1 (or 2:2 in some cases) bachelor honours degree, although candidates with firsts are in a considerably stronger position to gain a place in a postgraduate course and to obtain funding, especially in medical and natural sciences. Some institutions specify a 2:1 minimum for certain types of master's program, such as for a Master of Research course.

Candidates with a Third or an Ordinary degree are sometimes accepted, provided they have acquired satisfactory professional experience subsequent to graduation. A candidate for a doctoral programme is nearly always required to have a first or 2:1 at bachelor's level.

== Medical degrees ==
In the United Kingdom, medicine is usually taught as an undergraduate course, with graduates being awarded a master's level qualification: normally the conjoined degrees of Bachelor of Medicine, Bachelor of Surgery (MBBS, BM BCh, MB ChB, etc.) although at Queen's University Belfast (and universities in Ireland) Bachelor in the Art of Obstetrics (BAO) is added, and at some universities only the Bachelor of Medicine is awarded – all of these have equal standing. Unlike most undergraduate degrees, the MBBS is not normally considered an honours degree, and thus is not classified into first-class honours, etc. Students may be awarded merit and distinction for parts of the course or the whole course (depending on the institution) and honours may be awarded at some institutions for exceptional performance throughout the course (as a grade above distinction).

Medical schools split their year groups into 10 deciles. These deciles are the major factor in the calculation of educational performance measure (EPM) points used as part of medical students' Foundation Programme applications, with the top decile receiving 43 points, decreasing by a point for each decile (so the lowest gets 34 points); 7 points can be awarded for other educational achievements (other degrees and publications), and the EPM points are combined with up to 50 points from the situational judgement test to give a total out of 100.

== Grade point average ==
Following the recommendation of the Burgess report into the honours degree classification system in 2007, the Higher Education Academy ran a pilot in 2013–2014 in collaboration with 21 institutions delivering higher education (ranging from Russell Group universities to further education colleges) to investigate how a grade point average (GPA) system would work best in Britain. Two main weighting systems were tested: an American-style average of all marks, weighted only by credit value, and weighting by "exit velocity" in the manner of the honours classification, where modules in the first year are given a low or zero weight and modules in the final year have a higher weight (a third model was only rarely used). Over two-thirds of providers preferred exit-velocity weighting to the straight average.

A GPA scale, tied to percentage marks and letter grades, was recommended for use nationally following the study, to run in parallel with the honours degree classification system. However, a Universities UK and Guild HE report in 2017 found that adoption had been slow, further uptake in the future was unlikely, and the envisaged benefits had not been delivered. Problems encountered included a lack of awareness among employers and students, meaning that where it was introduced it was typically in parallel to instead of in place of traditional degree classifications. Of the 19 institutions who had introduced GPA or had plans to do so, 12 had adopted the HEA-recommended scale while the others had adopted or planned to adopt a different scale. This, together with differences in whether modules were weighted equally (10/19) or differently (9/19) and other differences in design and implementation, meant that GPA scores were not likely to be easily comparable between institutions.

Percentage	Grade	Grade points
75–100	A+	4.25
71–74	A	4.00
67–70	A−	3.75
64–66	B+	3.50
61–63	B	3.25
57–60	B−	3.00
54–56	C+	2.75
50–53	C	2.50
48–49	C−	2.25
43–47	D+	2.00
40–42	D	1.50
38–39	D−	1.00
35–37	F+	0.75
30–34	F	0.50
0–29	F−	0.00

== See also ==
- Latin honors
