= QF-EHEA =

Frameworks describing higher education qualification

The Framework for Qualifications of the European Higher Education Area (QF-EHEA) is a qualifications framework describing the higher education qualifications of countries participating in the Bologna Process. National qualifications frameworks (NQFs) provide a mapping between higher education qualifications and an overarching framework, allowing the cross-comparison of qualifications from different countries.

The overarching framework was adopted in May 2005 at a meeting of education ministers of the 48 participating countries. It consists of three cycles, approximately equivalent to bachelor's, master's and research doctorates (PhD-equivalent) degrees in the Anglophone world (note that US first professional degrees such as MD and JD are not PhD-equivalent, even though they are titled "doctorates"). A "short cycle" is also recognised within the first cycle, equivalent to British foundation degrees. These four levels are aligned with levels five to eight of the European Qualifications Framework.

== QF-EHEA in Spain ==
The NQF in Spain is the Marco Español de Cualificaciones para la Educación Superior (MECES) (Spanish Framework for Higher Education Qualification). This replaced the earlier system of diplomado, licenciado and doctor from 2005, with a transitional period lasting until 2013. The mapping to the EHEA framework is:

| MECES level | Qualifications | Equivalent EHEA cycle |
|---|---|---|
| 4 | Título de Doctor | Third Cycle |
| 3 | Título de Grado universitario con 300 ECTS o más; Título de Máster universitario; Título de Máster en Enseñanzas Artísticas | Second Cycle |
| 2 | Título de Graduado; Título de Graduado de las enseñanzas artísticas superiores | First Cycle |
| 1 | Técnico Superior de Formación Profesional; Técnico Superior de Artes Plásticas y Diseño; Técnico Deportivo Superior | Short Cycle |

== QF-EHEA in the United Kingdom ==
The NQFs linked to the QF-EHEA are the Framework for Higher Education Qualifications (FHEQ) for England, Wales and Northern Ireland and the Framework for Qualifications of Higher Education Institutions in Scotland (FQHEIS). The FQHEIS was certified as being aligned with the QF-EHEA in 2006 and the FHEQ in 2008.

The levels on the two national frameworks, and their mapping to the QF-EHEA, are as follows:

| FHEQ level | FQHEIS level | Qualifications | Equivalent EHEA cycle |
|---|---|---|---|
| 8 | 12 | PhD/DPhil; Professional doctorates | Third Cycle |
| 7 | 11 | Master's degree; Integrated master's degree; Primary qualifications (first degrees) in medicine, dentistry and veterinary science | Second Cycle |
| 7 | 11 | PGCE; PGDip; PGCert | N/A |
| 6 | 10 | Bachelor's degree with honours | First Cycle |
| 6 | 9 | Bachelor's degree (ordinary or pass degree) | First Cycle |
| 6 | 9 | Graduate Certificate; Graduate Diploma; Professional Graduate Certificate in Education | N/A |
| 5 | N/A | Foundation degree | Short Cycle |
| 5 | 8 | DipHE | Short Cycle |
| 5 | N/A | HND (awarded by a degree-awarding body) | Short Cycle |
| 4 | N/A | Higher National Certificate (awarded by a degree-awarding body) | N/A |
| 4 | 7 | Certificate of Higher Education | N/A |

== QF-EHEA in the Republic of Ireland ==
The NFQ for Ireland is the National Framework of Qualifications (NFQ), which spans the full range of educational qualifications available. It was verified as compatible with the EHEA Framework in 2006. The NQF has the following mapping to the EHEA Framework:

| NFQ level | Qualifications | Equivalent EHEA cycle |
|---|---|---|
| 10 | Higher doctorate; Doctoral degree | Third Cycle |
| 9 | Master's degree | Second Cycle |
| 9 | Postgraduate diploma | Second Cycle (Intermediate qualification) |
| 8 | Honours bachelor's degree; Higher diploma | First Cycle |
| 7 | Ordinary bachelor's degree | First Cycle |
| 6 | Higher Certificate | Short Cycle |
