= Academic certificate =

Document that certifies having received specific education

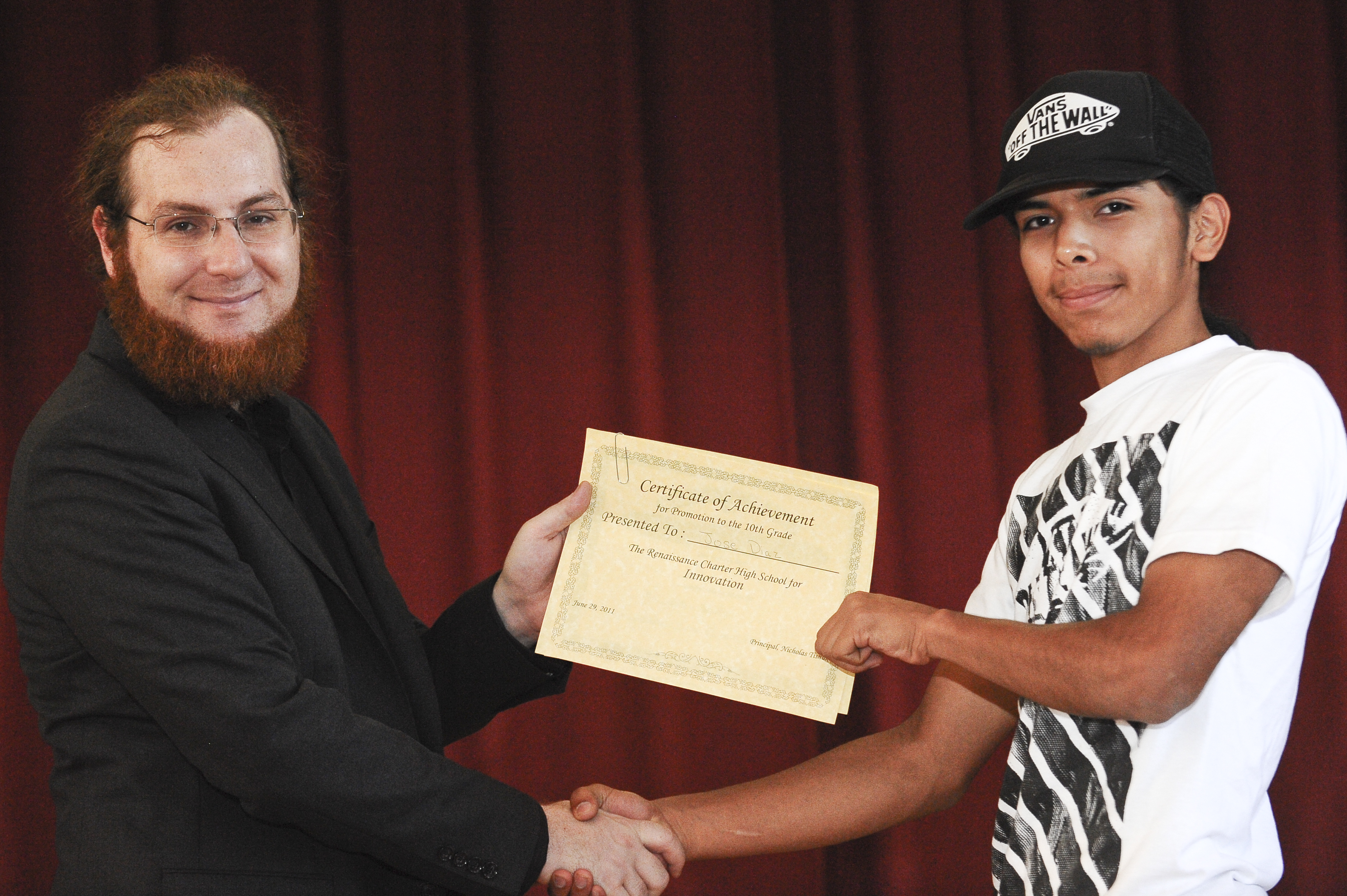
A student being awarded a certificate in an American high school.

An academic certificate or tech certificate is a document that certifies that a person has received specific education or has passed a test or series of tests.

== Overview ==
In many countries, a certificate is a qualification attained in secondary education. For instance, students in Ireland sit the Junior Certificate and follow it with the Leaving Certificate. Similarly, other countries have awards, for instance, in Australia the Higher School Certificate (HSC) in New South Wales, the Victorian Certificate of Education (VCE) in Victoria, etc., is the examination taken on completion of secondary education. In parts of the United Kingdom the General Certificate of Secondary Education (GCSE) is the normal examination taken at age 16 and the General Certificate of Education (GCE) Advanced Subsidiary Level (AS-level) and Advanced Level (A-levels) are taken at 17 and 18.

In many other countries, certificates are qualifications in higher education. For example, the National Certificate in Ireland, which was replaced in 2006 by the "Higher Certificate". These have the titles Certificate (at an undergraduate level), Graduate Certificate (at an undergraduate level, but requiring the completion of a prior undergraduate degree for admission), and Postgraduate Certificate (at a postgraduate level). In Hong Kong, students take the exams to receive Hong Kong Diploma of Secondary Education. Certificate is below the standard of the associate degree, diploma, higher diploma and advanced diploma, which are below the bachelor's degree. Postgraduate certificates are taken after the bachelor's degree and are sometimes more vocationally oriented than master's degrees.

In Australia, a certificate is a qualification offered by a university or other higher education provider which is shorter than a degree or diploma. Certificates are generally provided by TAFE colleges or non-academic registered training organizations (often workplaces). There are four ranks of certificate in Australia, indicated by Roman numerals, e.g., Cert. IV in Horticulture. The time spent varies, but in general a Certificate I will be granted after a course of only a few weeks, while a Cert. IV may take up to twelve months. A Diploma directly follows Cert. IV and may rightly be considered equivalent to a hypothetical Certificate V.

In the United Kingdom, a Certificate of Higher Education (CertHE) requires successful completion of 120 credits at level four of the Framework for Higher Education Qualifications (level 7 of the Scottish Credit and Qualifications Framework). This is equivalent to one year of full-time university education at first-year level. Each credit is equivalent to a nominal ten hours of study, and as such the CertHE is 1,200 hours of study. This compares with 360 credits (spanning levels 4, 5 and 6/480 credits spanning levels 7 to 10 in Scotland) for an honours bachelor's degree, and 240 credits (spanning level 4 and 5/7 and 8 in Scotland) for a Diploma of Higher Education. A certificate can also be a vocational qualification of between 13 and 36 credits at any of the levels of the Regulated Qualifications Framework, the level being specified in the qualification title.

In the United States, a certificate may be offered by an institute of higher education. These certificates usually signify that a student has reached a standard of knowledge about a certain vocational or professional subject. Certificate programs can be completed more quickly than associate degrees and often do not have general education requirements. Undergraduate certificates represent completion of a specific program offered in coordination with a bachelor's degree. Graduate certificates represent completion of studies beyond the bachelor's degree, yet short of a master's degree.

In the State of Maryland, a Certificate of Merit was, until recently, issued to graduating high-school seniors who met certain academic requirements (such as completion of advanced courses and a cumulative GPA of 3.00); the statewide certificate has since been replaced by "endorsements" defined by each local school system.

It also may be awarded as a necessary certification to validate that a student is considered competent in a certain specific networking skill area in information technology. Thus a computer engineer or computer science graduation most likely will have to obtain additional certificates on and pertaining to the specific technologies or equipment used by the hiring corporation; if not, such employer may suffer unwanted penalties like forgoing (voiding the contract) the protections of a certain level of customer service or warranties.

== Higher-level academic certificates ==
It is becoming more common for higher education institutions to award certificates to continuing education students. These certificates vary, usually involve rigorous courses, and can be affiliated with many associations. Examples would include CMA or CGA. University certificates are also becoming more common ways for people to engage in areas of interest while working full-time. They can be completed with a minimum grade in a series of university courses, and are sometimes taken as a way to further one's professional career (either by requirement or choice). They are gaining credence and ground in both the academic world and the working world.

== See also ==
- Graduate certificate
- Academic degree
- Doctorate
- List of professional designations in the United States
- List of computer security certifications
- Tech ed
