= Associate degree =

Undergraduate degree

An associate degree or associate's degree is an undergraduate degree awarded after a course of post-secondary study lasting two to three years. It is a level of academic qualification above a high school diploma and below a bachelor's degree.

The first associate degrees were awarded in the UK (where they are no longer awarded) in 1873 before spreading to the US in 1898. In the United States, the associate degree may allow transfer into the third year of a bachelor's degree. Associate degrees have since been introduced in a small number of other countries.

== History ==
The title of Associate in Physical Science (Associate in Science (ASc) from 1879) was introduced in 1865 by the University of Durham College of Physical Sciences (now Newcastle University) and awarded from 1873. It required (in 1884) passes in three of mathematics, physics, chemistry and geology, and allowed students to go on to take the examination for the Bachelor of Science. As a university-level qualification lying below the bachelor's degree, this is considered to be the world's first associate degree in the modern sense, having been first awarded 25 years prior to the introduction of associate degrees into the US by the University of Chicago. The ASc was withdrawn in 1904. Durham also introduced an Associate in Theology (ATh) in 1901, which was only offered in 1901 and 1902. Yorkshire College (now the University of Leeds) offered Associate in Engineering and Associate in Coal Mining degrees from 1877 and there were thirteen different types of associate degrees offered in British universities in 1927.

The title of Associate in Arts, introduced by the University of Oxford in 1857 and sometimes referred to as degree of Associate in Arts, predated the Durham degree. However, it was an examination for "those who are not members of the university" and who were under the age of 18; as such it was at the level of a high school qualification rather than a modern associate degree. Examinations were held in English, languages, mathematics, science, drawing and music, with the title being conferred on those students who passed any two (as long as the two were not drawing and music).

The qualification was introduced in the US in 1899, when the University of Chicago decided to replace its certificates with associate degrees, which were first awarded in 1900. American educationalist Walter Crosby Eells concluded that it is "not unlikely" that people at Chicago knew of the associate degrees being awarded in the United Kingdom, but there is no direct evidence of this. Chicago discontinued its associate degrees in 1918.

The associate degree spread across the US, with California College in Oakland (now the American Baptist Seminary of the West) introducing Associate in Arts and Associate in Letters degrees in 1900, and the Lewis Institute in Chicago (now part of the Illinois Institute of Technology) introducing Associate in Literature and Associate in Science degrees in 1901 (both replaced by the Associate in Arts in 1904) followed by the Associate in Domestic Economy degree in 1908. Associate degrees were not always two-year sub-bachelor's awards in the early 20th century: Harvard University and associated colleges awarded Associate in Arts degrees to students who had passed university extension courses "equal in number and standard to the courses required of a resident student for the degree of Bachelor of Arts" from 1910 to 1933.

By 1918, 23% of junior colleges were awarding Associate in Arts degrees. By 1941–42, 40% of junior colleges awarded some form of associate degree, and by 1960 this had grown to 75%, with 137 different associate degrees in use. Over a third of associate degrees awarded in the US in 1958–59 were granted by Californian junior colleges.

== Usage by country ==
=== United States ===
In the United States, associate degrees are awarded after completion of sixty semester or ninety quarter college credits.

The two most commonly awarded associate degrees are the Associate in/of Arts (AA) and Associate in/of Science (AS) degrees. AA degrees are awarded in the liberal arts, humanities, and social science fields; AS degrees are awarded in the natural science, applied science, and formal science fields.

Generally, one year of study is focused on college level general education in disciplines such as Communications, English, History, Mathematics, Natural Science, and Social Science, and the second year is focused on the area of a student's major.

Students who complete a vocational program can often earn a terminal associate degree such as the Associate of Applied Arts (AAA) or the Associate of Applied Science (AAS).

Transfer admissions in the United States sometimes allows courses taken and credits earned on an AA or AS to be counted toward a bachelor's degree more commonly through articulation or transfer credit agreements but sometimes through recognition of prior learning, depending on the courses taken, applicable state laws/regulations, and the transfer requirements of the university.

Common associate-level degree titles include:

- Associate of Arts (AA)
- Associate of Applied Arts (AAA)
- Associate of Applied Business (AAB)
- Associate of Applied Science (AAS)
- Associate of Forestry (AF)
- Associate of Fine Arts (AFA)
- Associate of Theology (ThA or ATh)
- Associate of Science (AS)
- Associate of Science in Nursing (ASN) or Associate Degree Nursing (ADN)
- Associate of Occupational Studies (AOS)

==== California ====
The Student Transfer Achievement Reform Act was signed into legislation on September 29, 2010, granting any California Community College student who has earned the Associate in Arts degree for Transfer (AA-T) or the Associate in Science degree for Transfer (AS-T) priority admission to CSU (California State University) into a similar baccalaureate (BA) degree program with a guarantee of junior standing.

=== West Indies ===
Two year associate degrees are found throughout the West Indies. They are offered by regional organisations such as the Caribbean Examinations Council and the University of the West Indies, and at institutions of higher education in particular, within Trinidad and Tobago, Barbados, Jamaica, and St. Kitts and Nevis, among others.

=== Canada ===
British Columbia is the only Canadian province offering American-style associate degrees. Similar to the U.S., these consist of a two-year program and allow for articulation onto the third year of a bachelor's degree program.

=== Australia ===
In 2004, Australia added "associate degree" to the Australian Qualifications Framework. This title was given to courses more academically focused than advanced diploma courses, and typically designed to articulate to bachelor's degree courses.

=== Netherlands ===
In the Netherlands, there were four pilots between 2005 and 2011 to assess the added value of the associate degree. In 2007 the associate degree was added to the Dutch system of higher education within the Higher Professional Education (HBO) stream taught at universities of applied sciences (hogeschool). Associate degree courses form part of HBO bachelor's degree courses, and advising requirements are the same for the two-year associate degree and the related four-year bachelor's degree. Those gaining the associate degree may proceed to an HBO bachelor's degree in only two years, but it does not articulate to bachelor's degrees in the research-oriented (WO) stream.

=== Hong Kong ===
In Hong Kong, associate degrees were first introduced in 2000 with the aim of increasing the number of students with post-secondary qualifications. As originally introduced, the qualification took two or three years, but this was reformed in 2012 to a two-year course. The associate degree is designed as a general academic education qualification, compared to the more vocational Diploma/Higher/Advanced Diploma (Qualifications Frameworks Level 4), and allows articulation onto the third year of a four-year (US-style) bachelor's degree or the second year of a three-year (British-style) bachelor's degree. A survey in 2016 showed that most students believe associate degrees will help them to get onto bachelor's degree courses, but not (by themselves) in gaining a career; however only 30% of associate degree graduates gained places for further study, leading to accusations that the degree is "a waste of time and money" and calls for the government to address this by making more bachelor's degree places available. This has been criticized, with others saying that education had benefits beyond income, which is only a short-term measure.

=== Pakistan ===
The Higher Education Commission (HEC) of Pakistan has approved Associate Degree Programs (ADP) to replace the traditional two-year BA/BSc programs. This transition aligns with the HEC's Undergraduate Education Policy, which mandates that all ADPs must receive approval from the relevant statutory bodies of the respective universities. An associate degree is a two-year undergraduate degree program abbreviated as ADP in Pakistan and is authorized by the Higher Education Commission through an Authorization Letter. In place of two-year BA/BSc Programs (which have been terminated vide Notification No. 9-2(16)/ phasing out BA/BSc/Curri/HEC/2016/982 dated March 15, 2017), universities and colleges affiliated with public sector universities may offer Associate Degree Programs (AD) for post-higher secondary students, in accordance with the given policies. All universities in Pakistan may offer associate degrees upon receiving the appropriate authorization from HEC Pakistan.

=== Turkey ===
Associate degrees are called önlisans derecesi in Turkey, while bachelor's degrees are known as lisans derecesi.

== Similar qualifications by country ==
=== The Americas ===
==== Argentina ====
In Argentina, tertiary colleges (institutos terciarios) offer carrera técnica, tecnicatura or Técnico Superior Universitario qualifications that are similar to associate degrees in a variety of areas, including qualifications for elementary and high school teachers, as well as other technical fields, upon completion of three or four years of study. Some of these degrees may be articulated with university programs to obtain a bachelor degree, usually after two additional years. Such qualifications are also offered by some universities as a final degree or as an intermediate stage before a bachelor degree.

==== Brazil ====
In 2001, Brazil added tecnólogo ('technologist') as a form of undergraduate degree program (graduação). A technologist's degree varies between two and three years of full time studies to complete. This degree takes a shorter time period to obtain than a bachelor or teaching degree (some of which may take between four and six years to complete), and it aims to provide highly specialized knowledge (e.g., agribusiness technical degree, tourism management degree, web development technical degree, etc.). There is also official recognition for a type of course called sequencial ('sequential') - students receive this associate degree as in junior college.

==== Canada ====
Education in Canada is a provincial power: each province and territory regulates tertiary education and the degree system in their jurisdictions, with pan-Canadian co-ordination in a Council of Ministers of Education, Canada. Aside from British Columbia, the Canadian provinces do not offer associate degrees but do offer similar higher education qualifications below the bachelor's level. These are two-year courses resulting in a diploma in a broad range of technical, professional and academic subjects. Articulation into bachelor's programs is the norm but can differ by subject (with some specialties rarer among bachelor's degrees). Ontario also offers three-year advanced diplomas which are not considered as associate degrees. The territories have fewer but similar diploma programs, some being particularly geared to Arctic environments and northern Indigenous cultures and languages, with bachelor's programs being a mix of local provisions, partnerships with institutions based elsewhere in Canada and international consortia. Indigenous nations in most provinces have education systems that also provide First Nations-focused diplomas programs, with North American Aboriginal education bodies. In Quebec, the Diplôme d'études collégiales (diploma of college studies), taught at post-secondary collèges d'enseignement général et professionnel (colleges of general and professional education; cégeps) can be a two-year pre-university qualification that is a pre-requisite for entry into the bachelor's degree. However, because a bachelor's degree in Quebec takes 3 years to complete instead of 4 years, it can be thought of as an articulation onto the second year of a standard North American bachelor's degree program. Quebec also has a three-year Cégep technical programme preparing students for employment.

=== Europe ===
Qualifications on the short cycle of the Bologna Process/level 5 on the European Qualifications Framework sit between secondary education and bachelor's degree level and are thus approximately equivalent to an associate degree. Such qualifications include the Foundation degree (FdA, FdSc, FdEng), Certificate of Higher Education (CertHE) and Diploma of Higher Education (DipHE) in the United Kingdom, the Higher Certificate in the Republic of Ireland, and the French Diplôme universitaire de Technologie (DUT) and Brevet de Technicien supérieur (BTS).

==== Czech Republic ====
In Czech Republic one equivalent title is DiS. (Diplomovaný Specialista; Certificated Specialist). By Czech school education law, these programs last for three to three and a half years, but most often 3 years. The awarded degree corresponds to EQF 6/ISCED 650, and is equivalent to a bachelor's degree, but without the possibility of continuing to a master's degree, since education is provided by a post-secondary vocational school (vyšší odborná škola). Thus, this degree is not academic but vocational, certifying the holder's ability to perform particular activities and operations. On the contrary, a bachelor's degree is conferred by a university (univerzita, vysoká škola) and is a prerequisite to a master's degree.

==== Denmark ====
A 2–2.5 year education at the BA-level is called an erhvervsakademiuddannelse, or AP-Degree (Academy Professional Degree) in English.

==== Nigeria ====
Associate degrees are not part of the Nigerian higher education system. The closest equivalent is the National Diploma (ND), a two-year higher education qualification awarded by polytechnics, monotechnics, and other accredited institutions.

Nigerian equivalents to associate degrees vary depending on the national system to which they are compared. The National Diploma is generally considered comparable to a two-year short-cycle higher education qualification. Despite sharing the same name, the Nigerian Higher National Diploma is not equivalent to the British Higher National Diploma, as it is a post-diploma qualification requiring prior completion of the National Diploma and is typically completed after approximately five years of study and mandatory industrial training.

==== France ====
For many decades, a diploma comparable to an associate degree was considered a very adequate degree for those willing to work as qualified technicians. Yet as the general population spends an increasing amount of time studying, they are no longer as attractive to students who wish to distinguish themselves. In 2021, the Diplôme Universitaire de Technologie (DUT) was reframed as an intermediate degree, part of a three-year curriculum now referred to as BUT. Prior to the reform of 2006, universities awarded a two-year diploma called DEUG, the purpose of which was also to help the student pursue studies in a field that differed from what was initially intended. The degree was considered a 'stepping stone' to the completion of a bachelor's degree. Aside from the Brevet de Technicien Supérieur (BTS) which remains relevant in many fields for which long academic studies are not deemed crucial and for which young professionals are in demand, degrees comparable to an associate degree are gradually being phased out, although their legitimacy remains in theory (but not always in practice) unchanged for those who were awarded one in the past.

==== Norway ====
A two-year education on the BA-level is called høgskolekandidat, translated as "university college graduate". Only a few professions require 120 ECTS, such as a piano tuner or driving instructor.

==== Spain ====
In Spain, Formación profesional includes post-secondary short-cycle qualifications such as ciclos formativos de grado superior, which combine classroom learning with practical training and lead to the title of Técnico Superior. These programs can provide access to university studies and may also be recognized for credit within higher education.

==== Sweden ====
A 2–2.5 year education on the BA-level is called an AP-Degree (Academy Professional Degree). Business academies offer two-year academy profession programmes; some business academies also offer professional bachelor programmes, further adult education and diploma programmes.

==== United Kingdom ====
Associate degrees are not part of any of the national qualifications frameworks in the United Kingdom. Two-year sub-degree higher education qualifications that are considered short-cycle qualifications in the European Higher Education Area are foundation degrees, Diplomas of Higher Education and Higher National Diplomas (if awarded by a degree-awarding body). One-year sub-degree higher education qualifications, not considered short-cycle qualifications, are Certificates of Higher Education and Higher National Certificates (if awarded by a degree-awarding body).

British equivalents to associate degrees vary depending on the national system which issued them. Based on assessment by the UK NARIC, American and Canadian associate degrees are considered equivalent to one year higher education courses such as the Higher National Certificate at level 4 of the British Framework for Higher Education Qualifications. Australian associate degrees, however, are considered equivalent to two-year higher education courses such as the Higher National Diploma at level 5 on the framework.

=== Asia ===
==== Indonesia ====
In Indonesia, the common name for the equivalent to an associate degree is D3, where D4 is equivalent to a bachelor's degree.
