= Key Stage 5 =

Educational level in the UK

Key Stage 5 refers to the education of students ages 16 to 19 in sixth forms and further education colleges in England and Northern Ireland. It follows Key Stage 4, and technically falls outside the national curriculum. During Key Stage 5, pupils study for A-levels or an equivalent qualification. Other advanced level qualifications pursued at Key Stage 5 may include AS level, International Baccalaureate diploma, and vocational and technical qualifications (VTQ) such as BTEC, BTEC extended diploma, or T Level. In November 2025, the UK government published plans to introduce a new V Level qualification to sit alongside A Levels and T Levels.

== See also ==
- Key Stage
- Key Stage 1
- Key Stage 2
- Key Stage 3
- Key Stage 4
- GCE Advanced Level
