= Samui Centre of Learning =

Coordinates: 13.809378°N 100.562732°E

SCL International School (Samui Centre of Learning)
- โรงเรียนนานาชาติเอสซีแอล
- Koh Samui; Thailand

Information
- Type: International
- Established: August 30, 2004
- Closed: April 2018
- Head of school: Mr. Ryan Caswell
- Staff: 50
- Grades: Foundation Stage through A Levels
- Enrollment: 200

Samui Centre of Learning (Thai: โรงเรียนนานาชาติเอสซีแอล, RTGS: Rong Rian Nana Chat Aet Si Aaen), Koh Samui, Thailand, (SCL) closed permanently in April 2018. It was an international school established in 2004 by Phillip Olson, Rachel Anderson and Roz Thompson. The school offered a mixed international curriculum from nursery to secondary (nursery-Year 11). Samui Centre of Learning is the longest-running international school and an examination centre on Koh Samui.

== Curriculum ==
Samui Centre of Learning operated within an international curriculum framework. Children received an hour of Thai language tuition every day and learn about Thai Culture, Thai Music and Thai Dancing.

Most classes were taught by teaching staff holding either a PGCE, Bachelor of Education or, latterly, TEFL and were predominantly foreign nationals. Where necessary, children received EAL (English as an additional language) support from qualified TEFL teachers.

=== Levels/Classes ===
- Foundation Stage: Foundation Stage 1-2
- Primary Key Stage 1: Year 1-2
- Primary Key Stage 2: Year 3-6
- Secondary Key Stage 3: Year 7-9
- Secondary Key Stage 4: Year 10-11
- Secondary Key Stage 5: Year 12-14

== Facilities ==
Samui Centre of Learning had air-conditioned classrooms, a science lab, a library and an ICT suite. The school building sat alongside the playground and a small playing field.
