= Bursary =

Monetary award to help facilitate study

A bursary is a monetary award made by any educational institution or funding authority to individuals or groups. It is usually awarded to enable a student to attend school, university, or college when they might not be able to otherwise. Some awards are aimed at encouraging specific groups or individuals to study.

== England ==
In England, financial support may be available from the college that the student attends. If the student is studying at either a publicly funded Sixth Form college or in a publicly funded Further Education college, financial support may be offered depending on their financial and personal circumstances. Each college has eligibility criteria and a college is able to provide details on which bursaries are available and what level of financial support students may be eligible for.

Financial support is almost always based on the student's ″household″ income along with other criteria. Income limits and eligibility vary from college to college so students must contact their college to obtain this information, although there are some basic eligibility requirements provided by the UK government on their website. If a student is considered to be a vulnerable student, a bursary of up to £1,200 is available depending on circumstances.

Many colleges will ask students to make a bursary application online. Other colleges will require a paper application form. Evidence to support an application will always be required. Evidence documents may be scanned copies or photographs of documents but they must be verifiable and accepted by the college before a student will have their application approved. Some colleges will only allow paper versions of evidence. Examples of financial support provided by colleges in England are as follows. This list is not exhaustive; it is based on the awards provided by over sixty colleges in England (in 2020).

- Free college meals
- Travel to and from college
- Equipment required for a course
- Uniform required
- Childcare whilst at college

== Scotland ==
To obtain such a bursary, it is customary for the student or their parents or guardians to be asked to provide details of their financial circumstances, supported by documentary evidence. The amounts awarded in Scotland, for instance, are made on a sliding scale, with household income below £34,000 p.a. (as of 2020) attracting awards. The application will be considered by the awarding organisation according to its published conditions although appeals may be considered from applicants in special or extenuating circumstances. The award will usually cover a specific period and may be given as a lump sum or on a declared schedule. Most bursaries are reviewed annually to ensure that the justification for an award remains. Changes in circumstances or study conditions such as a change of course during the academic year may result in the bursary being varied or stopped altogether.

== General ==
Bursaries are similar to but distinct from "scholarships" or "prizes", which are based on performance or sponsorship. Scholarships and prizes are generally awarded for good performance in the study preceding course entrance in which the student achieves grades above the standard entry. These funders are usually education authorities, universities, companies and private trusts.
