= Key Stage =

Feature of the state education system in parts of the UK

A key stage is a stage of the state education system in England, Northern Ireland, the Isle of Man and the British Overseas Territory of Gibraltar setting the educational knowledge expected of students at various ages. The term is also used in some other autonomous territories such as Hong Kong, and countries such as Australia (some states), although the ages at which each key stage applies differ between countries.

Key Stages in England are often abbreviated as KS (eg KS1). Each key stage consists of a certain range of school years so there is no key stage for higher education.

In Wales, the new curriculum replaces key stages with "progression steps" at ages 5, 8, 11, 14 and 16, "relating to broad expectations of a child’s progress".

== Stages ==
In England, the stages are as follows:

Key stage (KS)	Ages (by 1 September)	Duration (by years)	School years (Y)	Final exams
	3-5	2 (1 compulsory)	Nursery and reception	Early Years Foundation Stage Profile is completed by the child's teacher at the end of their Reception year
1	5-7	2	1–2	KS1 SATs, Phonics and Reading Check (taken in Year 1 but may be retaken, if the required standard isn't reached, in Year 2)
2	7-11	4	3–6	SATs, eleven plus exam (generally only for Grammar school entry)
3	11-14	3	7–9	12+ and 13+ (generally only for Grammar school entry) formerly SATs (until 2017)
4	14-16	2	10–11	GCSEs
5	16-18	2	12–13	A-Levels, AS-Levels, NVQs, National Diplomas, International Baccalaureate (IB), T levels

The national curriculum sets out targets to be achieved in various subject areas at each of the Key Stages.

The Key Stages were first defined in the Education Reform Act 1988 to accompany the first introduction of the national curriculum. The precise definition of each of the main 4 key stages is age-related, incorporating all pupils of a particular age at the beginning of each academic year. The key stages were designed to fit with the most prevalent structures which had already grown up in the education system over the previous 100 years of development.

Prior to the four main key stages, pupils attend a Foundation Stage, the latter part of which is compulsory.

Key Stage 1 fits broadly with the first stage of primary education, often known as infant schools. This break had existed for some time, being acknowledged in the 1931 Hadow Report as 'axiomatic' by as early as 1870.

Key Stage 2 fits the later stage of primary education, often known as junior schools. Again, described by Sir William Henry Hadow, this took pupils up to the standardised break at age 11.

Secondary education was split between Key Stage 3 & Key Stage 4 at age 14, to align with long-existing two-year examination courses at GCSE level.

Key Stage 5 is the final Key Stage and refers to education for students beyond secondary school aged 16 to 18 participating in sixth form or college.
