= Credit Accumulation and Transfer Scheme =

UK university credit scheme

Credit Accumulation and Transfer Scheme (CATS) is used by many universities in the United Kingdom to monitor, record and reward passage through a modular degree course and to facilitate movement between courses and institutions. One UK credit is equivalent to the learning outcomes of 10 notional hours of study, thus a university course of 150 notional study hours is worth 15 credits, and a university course of 300 notional study hours is worth 30 credits. A full academic year is worth 120 credits and a full calendar year (normally only at postgraduate level) 180 credits. CATS schemes in use in Higher Education in the UK include CATS (England & Northern Ireland), SCOTCAT (Scotland), the Credit and Qualifications Framework for Wales credit framework (Wales), the Learning and Skills Development Agency credit framework and Open College Network credits.

Credits are associated with a level at which the learning took place. At universities in England, Wales and Northern Ireland, this will be one of Levels 4 to 8 on the Framework for Higher Education Qualifications (FHEQ), representing the first, second and third year of a bachelor's degree (levels 4 – 6), master's level (level 7) and doctoral level (level 8). In Scotland this will be at one of level 7 to 12 on the Scottish Credit and Qualifications Framework (SCQF), representing the first, second, third and fourth year of a bachelor's degree (levels 7 – 10), master's level (level 11) and doctoral level (level 12).

Typically, in England, Wales and Northern Ireland, a bachelor's degree with honours requires 360 credits, with at least 90 at level 6 of the FHEQ; an ordinary bachelor's degree requires 300 credits with 60 at level 6; a foundation degree requires 240 credits with 90 at level 5; an integrated master's degree requires 480 credits with 120 at level 7; a postgraduate taught master's degree requires 180 credits with 150 at level 7; and a professional doctorate requires 540 credits with 360 at level 8. Degrees in medicine, dentistry and veterinary science are not normally credit rated, nor are PhDs or master's degrees by research. In Scotland, a bachelor's degree with honours requires 480 credits, with at least 90 at level 9 of the SCQF and 90 at level 10; an ordinary bachelor's degree requires 360 credits with 60 at level 9; an integrated master's degree requires 600 credits with 120 at level 11; a postgraduate master's degree requires 180 credits with 150 at level 11; and a doctoral degree requires 540 credits with 420 at level 12. "Fast track" two-year bachelor's degrees at the University of Buckingham make use of the full calendar year to fit a 360 credit course into two years.

== Equivalence ==
UK Credits are the same at a nominal 10 hours of learning per credit unit across CATS, the Scottish Credit and Qualifications Framework (covering higher and further education, vocational education and school qualifications in Scotland), the Credit and Qualifications Framework for Wales (ditto for Wales) and the Regulated Qualifications Framework (further education and vocational education in England and Northern Ireland and school qualifications in England).

There is an official equivalence with the European Credit Transfer and Accumulation System (ECTS) where two UK credits equals one ECTS credit, based on there being 120 UK credits and 60 ECTS credits to an academic year.

Four CATS points are equivalent to one US credit hour. Rather than award fractional credits, US universities will sometimes consider a typical British 10 credit module to be worth 3 (rather than 2.5) US credit hours, similarly rounding 15 UK credit modules to 4 US credit hours and 20 UK credit modules to 5 US credit hours.
