= V Level =

V Levels are proposed post-16 qualifications in England. They are level 3 qualifications, introduced as a vocational equivalent to A Levels and T Levels, and to replace level 3 BTECs. They will first be introduced in September 2027 in three subjects: digital, education and early years, and finance and accounting. Each V Level will consist of 360 guided learning hours over two years, the equivalent to one A Level.
