= Professional Graduate Certificate in Education =

The Professional Graduate Certificate in Education (ProfGCE) is a Level 6 award in England and Wales for undergraduate degree holders who wish to become teachers.

It is very similar to the Postgraduate Certificate in Education (PGCE) and enables candidates to gain their Qualified Teacher Status (QTS), but does not carry credits towards a master's degree of which the PGCE provides 60.

It sits on the Honours Level of the Framework for Higher Education Qualifications (FHEQ), a level lower than the Postgraduate Certificate in Education. The Professional Graduate Certificate in Education level 6 is also a stand-alone qualification for those wishing to become a teacher in the post-compulsory sector. It can be used as an advanced pathway for those completing a Diploma in Education and Training level 5. Completion of the Diploma / Professional Graduate Certificate (typically two years part-time) allows you to apply for Qualified Teacher Learning and Skills (QTLS) status.
