= Graduate certificate =

Educational credential

A graduate certificate is a higher education qualification representing completion of specialized coursework at a college or university. A graduate certificate can be awarded by universities upon completion of certain coursework indicating mastering of a specific subject area. Graduate certificates represent training at different levels in different countries, for example a graduate certificate is at master's degree level in Ireland, but is at a bachelor's degree level in the United Kingdom.

== Variations ==
=== Australia ===
In Australia, a graduate certificate is a Level 8 qualification alongside the Bachelor (Honours) degree. Entry to a graduate certificate typically requires completion of a bachelor's degree (level 7) or higher. In some cases, admission may be on the basis of significant work experience. Graduate certificates typically take six months of full-time study to complete.

=== Canada ===
In Canada, a graduate certificate is a university or college credential usually offered to students who have completed an average of 15 credits of graduate course work. Admission requirements vary tremendously among Canadian universities and colleges, but in general both graduate students, as well as undergraduate students having completed a bachelor's degree, can apply to such a program. The graduate certificate can represent part of the coursework required for obtaining a master's degree.

=== Ireland ===
A graduate certificate is a master's-level qualification indicating the successful completion of a postgraduate programme of education. On the National Framework for Qualifications the qualification is at Level 9 or Level 7 on the European Qualifications Framework, normally with a size of 30 ECTS credits. The terms 'graduate certificate' and 'postgraduate certificate' are used interchangeably.

=== United Kingdom ===
A graduate certificate (GradCert, GCert, GradC) is a higher education qualification at the same level as a bachelor's degree but more limited in scope, taking less time to complete – normally between one third and two thirds of an academic year (or full-time equivalent). A longer period of work (but still less than required for a degree) would lead to a graduate diploma.

The graduate certificate is positioned at Level 6 (bachelor's degree level) of The framework for higher education qualifications in England, Wales and Northern Ireland, and at Level 9 or 10 (bachelor's degree at ordinary or honours level) of The framework for qualifications of higher education institutions in Scotland. In reference to the European Qualifications Framework, it is a 'first-cycle' qualification at the same level of knowledge and challenge as a first or bachelor's degree but without the same depth and breadth of study. Successful students will typically demonstrate some, but not all, of the kinds of skills, knowledge and capabilities that would be expected for a bachelor's candidate. Hence this certificate is not considered to be an 'end-of-cycle' qualification (it demonstrates only some of the 'first-cycle' learning outcomes).

Graduate certificates are available in a limited range of subjects that are typically work-related, for example psychology, management, counselling or law.

Graduate certificates are normally taken by those who have already graduated with a bachelor's degree in another discipline (hence the name). This qualification should not be confused with postgraduate certificates or postgraduate diplomas, which are master's degree-level qualification, or with certificates of Higher Education, which are lower-level qualifications normally taken by those without previous HE qualification.

=== United States ===
In the United States, a graduate certificate (GCert, GCERT, or CGS.) is a higher education qualification that may be awarded by universities upon completion of a post-graduate level programme. Graduate certificates are not equivalent to master's or doctoral degrees, typically focusing on a subset of the knowledge domain of such programmes.

In teaching, holding a graduate certificate may satisfy programme-specific education requirements not met with some interdisciplinary degrees.

== See also ==
- Academic certificate / (Undergraduate certificate)
- Australian Qualifications Framework
- Certificate of Advanced Study, a post-masters certification credential.
- Graduate diploma
- Tech certificate
