= National qualifications frameworks in the United Kingdom =

The national qualification frameworks in the United Kingdom are qualifications frameworks that define and link the levels and credit values of different qualifications.

The current frameworks are:

- The Regulated Qualifications Framework (RQF) for general and vocational qualifications regulated by Ofqual in England and the Council for the Curriculum, Examinations and Assessment (CCEA) in Northern Ireland;
- The Credit and Qualifications Framework for Wales (CQFW) in Wales, regulated by Qualifications Wales;
- The Scottish Credit and Qualifications Framework (SCQF) in Scotland;
- The Frameworks for Higher Education Qualifications of UK Degree-Awarding Bodies (FHEQ) for qualifications awarded by bodies across the United Kingdom with degree-awarding powers.

Credit frameworks use the Credit Accumulation and Transfer Scheme, where 1 credit = 10 hours of nominal learning.

== England, Wales and Northern Ireland ==
The Regulated Qualifications Framework (England and Northern Ireland) is split into nine levels: entry level (further subdivided into sub-levels one to three) and levels one to eight; the CQFW (Wales) has the same nine levels as the RQF and has adopted the same level descriptors for regulated (non-degree) qualifications. The FHEQ in England, Wales and Northern Ireland has five levels, numbered four to eight to match the RQF/CQFW levels.

The descriptors for the RQF are as follows:

RQF level	Level criteria	Example qualifications	Equivalent FHEQ qualifications
Level 8	Holder develops original practical, conceptual or technological understanding to create ways forward in contexts that lack definition and where there are many complex, interacting factors. Holder critically analyses, interprets and evaluates complex information, concepts and theories to produce new knowledge and theories. Holder understands and reconceptualises the wider contexts in which the field of knowledge or work is located. Holder extends a field of knowledge or work by contributing original knowledge and thinking. Holder exercises critical understanding of different theoretical and methodological perspectives and how they affect the field of knowledge or work. AND/OR; Holder can use advanced and specialised skills and techniques to conceptualise and address problematic situations that involve many complex, interacting factors. Holder can formulate and use appropriate methodologies and approaches. Holder can initiate, design and undertake research, development or strategic activities that extend or produce significant change in the field of work or study. Holder can critically evaluate actions, methods and results and their short- and long-term implications for the field of work or knowledge and its wider context.	Level 8 Award; Level 8 Certificate; Level 8 Diploma	PhD/DPhil; Professional doctorates
Level 7	Holder reformulates and uses practical, conceptual or technological knowledge and understanding of a subject or field of work to create ways forward in contexts where there are many interacting factors. Holder critically analyses, interprets and evaluates complex information, concepts and theories to produce modified conceptions. Holder understands the wider contexts in which the area of study or work is located. Holder understands current developments in the area of study or work. Holder understands different theoretical and methodological perspectives and how they affect the area of study or work. AND/OR; Holder can use specialised skills to conceptualise and address problematic situations that involve many interacting factors. Holder can determine and use appropriate methodologies and approaches. Holder can design and undertake research, development or strategic activities to inform or produce change in the area of work or study. Holder can critically evaluate actions, methods and results and their short- and long-term implications.	Level 7 Award; Level 7 Certificate; Level 7 Diploma	Master's degree; Integrated master's degree; Primary qualifications (first degrees) in medicine, dentistry and veterinary science; Postgraduate Certificate in Education; Postgraduate Diploma; Postgraduate Certificate
Level 6	Holder has advanced practical, conceptual or technological knowledge and understanding of a subject or field of work to create ways forward in contexts where there are many interacting factors. Holder understands different perspectives, approaches or schools of thought and the theories that underpin them. Holder can critically analyse, interpret and evaluate complex information, concepts and ideas. AND/OR; Holder can determine, refine, adapt and use appropriate methods and advanced cognitive and practical skills to address problems that have limited definition and involve many interacting factors. Holder can use and, where appropriate, design relevant research and development to inform actions. Holder can evaluate actions, methods and results and their implications.	Level 6 Award; Level 6 Certificate; Level 6 Diploma; Degree Apprenticeship	Bachelor's degree; Graduate Certificate; Graduate Diploma; Professional Graduate Certificate in Education
Level 5	Holder has practical, theoretical or technological knowledge and understanding of a subject or field of work to find ways forward in broadly defined, complex contexts. Holder can analyse, interpret and evaluate relevant information, concepts and ideas. Holder is aware of the nature and scope of the area of study or work. Holder understands different perspectives, approaches or schools of thought and the reasoning behind them. AND/OR; Holder can determine, adapt and use appropriate methods, cognitive and practical skills to address broadly defined, complex problems. Holder can use relevant research or development to inform actions. Holder can evaluate actions, methods and results.	Higher National Diploma; Level 5 NVQ; Level 5 Award; Level 5 Certificate; Level 5 Diploma; Level 5 Higher Apprenticeship	Foundation degree; Diploma of Higher Education; Higher National Diploma (awarded by a degree-awarding body)
Level 4	Holder has practical, theoretical or technical knowledge and understanding of a subject or field of work to address problems that are well defined but complex and non-routine. Holder can analyse, interpret and evaluate relevant information and ideas. Holder is aware of the nature of approximate scope of the area of study or work. Holder has an informed awareness of different perspectives or approaches within the area of study or work. AND/OR; Holder can identify, adapt and use appropriate cognitive and practical skills to inform actions and address problems that are complex and non-routine while normally fairly well-defined. Holder can review the effectiveness and appropriateness of methods, actions and results.	Higher National Certificate; Level 4 Award; Level 4 Certificate; Level 4 Diploma; Level 4 NVQ; Level 4 Higher Apprenticeship	Certificate of Higher Education; Higher National Certificate (awarded by a degree-awarding body)
Level 3	Holder has factual, procedural and theoretical knowledge and understanding of a subject or field of work to complete tasks and address problems that while well-defined, may be complex and non-routine. Holder can interpret and evaluate relevant information and ideas. Holder is aware of the nature of the area of study or work. Holder is aware of different perspectives or approaches within the area of study or work. AND/OR; Holder can identify, select and use appropriate cognitive and practical skills, methods and procedures to address problems that while well-defined, may be complex and non-routine. Holder can use appropriate investigation to inform actions. Holder can review how effective methods and actions have been.	A Level; Access to Higher Education Diploma; AS Level; Applied General; Cambridge Pre-U; International Baccalaureate Diploma; T Level; V Level; Level 3 Award; Level 3 Certificate; Level 3 Diploma; Level 3 NVQ; Level 3 ESOL; Level 3 National Certificate; Level 3 National Diploma; Music grades 6, 7 and 8; Advanced Apprenticeship; Welsh Bacc Advanced	
Level 2	Has knowledge and understanding of facts, procedures and ideas in an area of study or field of work to complete well-defined tasks and address straightforward problems. Holder can interpret relevant information and ideas. Holder is aware of a range of information that is relevant to the area of study or work. AND/OR; Holder can select and use relevant cognitive and practical skills to complete well-defined, generally routine tasks and address straightforward problems. Holder can identify how effective actions have been. Holder can identify, gather and use relevant information to inform actions.	GCSE grades A*–C; Reformed GCSE grades 4–9; CSE grade 1; Level 2 Award; Level 2 Certificate; Level 2 Diploma; Level 2 NVQ; Level 2 ESOL; Level 2 Essential Skills; Level 2 Functional Skills; Level 2 National Certificate; Level 2 National Diploma; Music grades 4 and 5; Welsh Bacc National; Intermediate Apprenticeship	
Level 1	Holder has basic factual knowledge of a subject and/or knowledge of facts, procedures and ideas to complete well-defined routine tasks and address simple problems; and is aware of aspects of information relevant to the area of study or work. AND/OR; Holder can use basic cognitive and practical skills to complete well-defined routine tasks and procedures. Holder can identify whether actions have been effective. Holder can select and use relevant information.	First Certificate; GCSE grades D–G; Reformed GCSE grades 1–3; Level 1 Award; Level 1 Certificate; Level 1 Diploma; Level 1 NVQ; Level 1 ESOL; Level 1 Essential Skills; Level 1 Functional Skills; Music grades 1, 2 and 3; Welsh Bacc Foundation	
Entry Level	Entry Level 3 Holder has basic knowledge and understanding to carry out structured tasks and activities in familiar contexts; and knows and understands the steps needed to complete structured tasks and activities in familiar contexts. AND/OR; Holder can carry out structured tasks and activities in familiar contexts. Holder can be aware of the consequences of actions for self and others.	Entry Level Award; Entry Level Certificate; Entry Level Diploma; Entry Level ESOL; Entry Level Essential Skills; Entry Level Functional Skills; Skills for Life	
Entry Level	Entry Level 2 Holder has basic knowledge or understanding of a subject and/or can carry out simple, familiar tasks; and knows the steps needed to complete simple activities. AND/OR; Holder can carry out simple, familiar tasks and activities. Follow instructions or use rehearsed steps to complete tasks and activities.	Entry Level Award; Entry Level Certificate; Entry Level Diploma; Entry Level ESOL; Entry Level Essential Skills; Entry Level Functional Skills; Skills for Life	
Entry Level	Entry Level 1 The holder progresses along a continuum that ranges from the most elementary of achievements to beginning to make use of knowledge and/or understanding that relate to the subject or immediate environment.	Entry Level Award; Entry Level Certificate; Entry Level Diploma; Entry Level ESOL; Entry Level Essential Skills; Entry Level Functional Skills; Skills for Life	

Normally (different rules apply for specifically-named qualifications such as GCSEs), the name of a qualification offered under the RQF will contain the name of the awarding organisation and the level of the qualification. It may also include "NVQ" to indicate that it meets certain criteria to be considered a vocational qualification: "the qualification is based on recognised occupational standards, confers occupational competence and requires work-based assessment and/or assessment in an environment that simulates the work place". The size of the qualification may be indicated by it being called an "Award" (less than 120 hours total qualification time/1–12 credits), "Certificate" (121 to 369 hours/13–36 credits) or "Diploma" (370 or more hours/37+ credits).

In general usage, qualifications are often compared to the best-known qualification at that level. For example, the Level 2 DiDA is often said to be equivalent to four GCSEs at grades A*–C.

While the frameworks say how qualifications compare in terms of size and level, they do not (except for the split of GCSEs across level 1 and 2) take grades into account, e.g. a first class honours degree and a pass degree are both 360 credit qualifications at level 6. For university entrance, the Universities and Colleges Admissions Service (UCAS) produces its own tariff for level 3 qualifications and international equivalents, based on grades achieved and the size of the qualification (in four size bands). Universities, colleges and employers are also free to make their own decisions on how they treat qualifications, and are not bound to follow the frameworks.

=== International equivalence ===
The RQF and CQFW have been referenced to the European Qualifications Framework (EQF) and can also be compared to the Common European Framework of Reference for Languages (CEFR), as laid out in the table below.

RQF/CQFW level	EQF level	CEFR level
8	8	C2
7	7	C2
6	6	C2
5	5	C1
4	5	C1
3	4	B2
2	3	B1
1	2	A2
E3	1	A1
E2		A1
E1		A1

== Scotland ==
The Scottish Credit and Qualifications Framework (SCQF) is a 12-level framework that unites qualifications from the Scottish Qualifications Authority and higher education institutes with Scottish Vocational Qualifications and Modern Apprenticeships:

SCQF level	SQA qualifications			HE qualifications		Vocational qualifications	
12			Professional Development Awards	Doctoral degree		Professional Apprenticeships	
11			Professional Development Awards	Master's degrees	Postgraduate diploma/certificate	Professional Apprenticeships	SVQ 5
10			Professional Development Awards	Honours bachelor's degree	Graduate diploma/certificate	Professional Apprenticeships	
9			Professional Development Awards	Ordinary bachelor's degree	Graduate diploma/certificate	Technical Apprenticeships	SVQ 4
8		Higher National Diploma	Professional Development Awards		Diploma of Higher Education	Technical Apprenticeships	SVQ 4
7	Advanced Higher Awards, Scottish Baccalaureate	Higher National Certificate	Professional Development Awards		Certificate of Higher Education	Modern Apprenticeships	SVQ 3
6	Higher Awards, Skills for Work Higher	National Certificates, National Progress Awards	Professional Development Awards			Modern Apprenticeships	SVQ 3
5	National 5 Awards, Skills for Work National 5	National Certificates, National Progress Awards				Modern Apprenticeships	SVQ 2
4	National 4 Awards, Skills for Work National 4	National Certificates, National Progress Awards					SVQ 1
3	National 3 Awards, Skills for Work National 3	National Certificates, National Progress Awards					
2	National 2 Awards	National Certificates, National Progress Awards					
1	National 1 Awards						

== Higher education qualifications ==
The Frameworks for Higher Education Qualifications of UK Degree-Awarding Bodies (FHEQ) includes separate descriptors for higher education (HE) qualifications in England, Wales and Northern Ireland and in Scotland for bachelor's degrees and below; for master's degrees and doctoral degrees the same descriptors apply across the UK. HE qualifications in Scotland are part of a sub-framework, the Framework for Qualifications of Higher Education Institutes in Scotland (FQHEIS), which is tied to the top six levels (7–12) of the SCQF. In England, Wales and Northern Ireland, the FHEQ uses the same numbering as the top 5 levels of the RQF and CQFW (4–8).

With respect to the European Higher Education Area (EHEA), only qualifications on the FHEQ (and only those with the full number of credits for that level) are certified as being equivalent to Bologna Process cycles, thus:

FHEQ (EWNI)	FQHEIS	Qualifications	Equivalent EHEA cycle
8	12	PhD/DPhil; Professional doctorates	Third Cycle
7	11	Master's degree; Integrated master's degree; Primary qualifications (first degrees) in medicine, dentistry and veterinary science	Second Cycle
7	11	PGCE; PGDip; PGCert	N/A
6	10	Bachelor's degree with honours	First Cycle
6	9	Bachelor's degree (ordinary or pass degree)	First Cycle
6	9	Graduate Certificate; Graduate Diploma; Professional Graduate Certificate in Education	N/A
5	N/A	Foundation degree	Short Cycle
5	8	DipHE	Short Cycle
5	N/A	Higher National Diploma HND (only on the Framework for Higher Education Qualifications if awarded by a degree-awarding body)	Short Cycle
4	7	Certificate of Higher Education	N/A
4	N/A	Higher National Certificate HNC (only on the Framework for Higher Education Qualifications if awarded by a degree-awarding body)	N/A

== History ==
=== Development of the frameworks for higher education qualifications ===
The idea of a national framework for higher education qualifications (FHEQ) was proposed by the Dearing and Garrick Reports in 1997. Dearing's proposed FHEQ had 8 levels, not all of which were subsequently adopted:

Level	Qualifications
H8	Doctorates
H7	MPhil
H6	Master's degree
H5	Higher honours/postgraduate conversion courses
H4	Honours degree
H3	Bachelor's degree
H2	Diploma
H1	Certificate

"Postgraduate conversion courses" were what are now called graduate certificates and diplomas but were, at the time of the report, often awarded as master's degrees, "Higher honours" referred to integrated master's degrees.

The first editions of the FHEQ were published by the Quality Assurance Agency in January 2001 as two documents: one covering England, Wales and Northern Ireland, the other Scotland. As currently, the 2001 England, Wales and Northern Ireland FHEQ had five levels, the 2001 Scotland FHEQ had six levels. The Scottish FHEQ was tied to the SCQF, but the England, Wales and Northern Ireland FHEQ was not tied to the NQF until 2004, when the latter was reorganised (as described below). The levels were:

EWNI 2001	Scotland 2001	Example qualifications	SCQF 2001	NQF 2004
5 – "D level" (Doctoral)	SHE D	Doctoral degree	12	8
4 – "M level" (Master's)	SHE M	Master's degree	11	7
3 - "H level" (Honours)	SHE H	Bachelor's degree with honours	10	6
2 - "I level" (Intermediate)	SHE 3	Non-honours bachelor's degree	9	5
2 - "I level" (Intermediate)	SHE 2	Foundation degree, Diploma of Higher Education	8	5
1 - "C level" (Certificate)	SHE 1	Certificate of Higher Education	7	4

While the framework for England, Wales and Northern Ireland did have numbered levels, the letter designations were often used to avoid confusion with the different numbering on the NQF.

The major difference between the 2001 framework and the current framework was the position of Ordinary (non-honours) bachelor's degrees. These were, at the time, considered to be at the same level as foundation degrees and diplomas of higher education in England, Wales and Northern Ireland, rather than being at the same level as honours degrees but with a lower credit value.

The Scottish FHEQ was certified as aligned with the framework of the European Higher Education Area (EHEQ) in 2007. The second edition of the FHEQ for England, Wales and Northern Ireland was issued in August 2008, and was also then certified as aligned with the EHEA framework. The major changes were the shifting of the non-honours bachelor's degree to its current position, allowing it to be considered a first cycle (end of cycle) qualification in the EHEA framework and the adoption of the NQF/QCF level numbers in place of the separate labelling of higher education levels; it also made explicit that primary qualifications in medicine, dentistry and veterinary science were at master's level. A second edition of the Scottish FHEQ was issued in June 2014, doing away with the separate labelling of levels in higher education and simply adopting the SCQF numbering, and a third edition of both, united into one document as The Frameworks for Higher Education Qualifications of UK Degree-Awarding Bodies, was published in November 2014. This gave unified level descriptors for master's degrees and doctoral degrees, while maintaining separate descriptors for lower level qualifications.

=== The Qualifications and Credit Framework ===
The Qualifications and Credit Framework was used from 2008 until 2015 in England, Wales and Northern Ireland. It replaced the National Qualifications Framework (NQF; see below) and was replaced in turn by the Regulated Qualifications Framework (RQF). It used the same levels as the (post 2004) NQF and the current RQF, but differed from the NQF in that in addition to qualifications being assigned a level they were assigned a credit value, indicating their size. The QCF had prescriptive rules on qualification design and assessment; a review in 2014 found that "the rules placed too much focus on structure, and not enough on validity, and that they were not flexible enough to meet the variety of needs covered by vocational qualifications". This led to the establishment of the RQF, which does not contain specific rules for qualifications in the manner of the QCF.

=== The National Qualifications Framework ===
National Qualifications Framework (NQF) was a former qualification framework developed for qualifications in England, Wales and Northern Ireland, which was in use between 1999 and 2008, although the five levels of NVQ dated from 1986.

The NQF was introduced to help employers compare the many hundreds of qualifications available in England, Wales and Northern Ireland. Originally, the framework only went up to Level 5, but in 2004 the old Level 4 was subdivided into Levels 4, 5 and 6 and the old Level 5 was subdivided into Level 7 and Level 8. This allowed the NQF to better align with its equivalent for higher education, the FHEQ.

The Framework, after 2004, had nine levels (with entry level qualifications offered at Entry 1, Entry 2 and Entry 3) covering all levels of learning in secondary education, further education, vocational, and higher education. Though academic higher education courses (such as academic degrees) were not covered in the NQF, it was broadly aligned with the Framework for Higher Education Qualifications (FHEQ), allowing levels of achievement to be compared.

NQF level	Level criteria
Level 8	Level 8 qualifications recognise leading experts or practitioners in a particular field. Learning at this level involves the development of new and creative approaches that extend or redefine existing knowledge or professional practice.
Level 7	Level 7 qualifications recognise highly developed and complex levels of knowledge that enable the development of in-depth and original responses to complicated and unpredictable problems and situations. Learning at this level involves the demonstration of high-level specialist professional knowledge and is appropriate for senior professionals and managers. Level 7 qualifications are at a level equivalent to master's degrees, postgraduate certificates and postgraduate diplomas.
Level 6	Level 6 qualifications recognise a specialist high-level knowledge of an area of work or study to enable the use of an individual's own ideas and research in response to complex problems and situations. Learning at this level involves the achievement of a high level of professional knowledge and is appropriate for people working as knowledge-based professionals or in professional management positions. Level 6 qualifications are at a level equivalent to bachelor's degrees with honours, graduate certificates and graduate diplomas.
Level 5	Level 5 qualifications recognise the ability to increase the depth of knowledge and understanding of an area of work or study to enable the formulation of solutions and responses to complex problems and situations. Learning at this level involves the demonstration of high levels of knowledge, a high level of work expertise in job roles and competence in managing and training others. Qualifications at this level are appropriate for people working as higher grade technicians, professionals or managers. Level 5 qualifications are at a level equivalent to intermediate higher education qualifications such as diplomas of higher education, foundation and other degrees that do not typically provide access to postgraduate programmes.
Level 4	Level 4 qualifications recognise specialist learning and involve detailed analysis of a high level of information and knowledge in an area of work or study. Learning at this level is appropriate for people working in technical and professional jobs, and/or managing and developing others. Level 4 qualifications are at a level equivalent to Certificates of Higher Education.
Level 3	Level 3 qualifications recognise the ability to gain, and where relevant apply a range of knowledge, skills and understanding. Learning at this level involves obtaining detailed knowledge and skills. It is appropriate for people wishing to go to university, people working independently, or in some areas supervising and training others in their field of work.
Level 2	Level 2 qualifications recognise the ability to gain a good knowledge and understanding of a subject area of work or study, and to perform varied tasks with some guidance or supervision. Learning at this level involves building knowledge and/or skills in relation to an area of work or a subject area and is appropriate for many job roles.
Level 1	Level 1 qualifications recognise basic knowledge and skills and the ability to apply learning with guidance or supervision. Learning at this level is about activities that mostly relate to everyday situations and may be linked to job competence.
Entry Level	Entry level qualifications recognise basic knowledge and skills and the ability to apply learning in everyday situations under direct guidance or supervision. Learning at this level involves building basic knowledge and skills and is not geared towards specific occupations.

Only when a course had been accredited and became part of the NQF was it then eligible for state funding. As such, some courses which were popular internationally and offered by British-based organisations were not available to state schools in England, Wales and Northern Ireland.

The NQF was the joint responsibility of England's QCA, Wales's DCELLS and Northern Ireland's CCEA.

BTECs and Cambridge courses are vocational equivalent, which under the QCF were equivalent to 1, 2 or 3 GCSEs or A Levels, at Grade A*-C. OCR Nationals were discontinued in 2012.

The NQF was replaced with the QCF, Qualifications and Credit Framework in 2010, which was a credit transfer system which indicated the size of qualifications (measured in learning hours), as well as their level. The QCF was, in turn, replaced by the Regulated Qualifications Framework in October 2015.

== Other frameworks ==
=== Frameworks for statistical purposes ===
The Higher Education Statistics Agency (HESA) classifies higher and further education courses using a more detailed framework using letter codes based on the original FHEQ. This separates postgraduate courses into research and taught, based on the largest component in terms of student effort. Doctorate-level courses are coded D for research and E for taught; master's-level courses are coded M for taught (including integrated master's courses) and L for research. Honours-level courses are coded H and non-honours bachelor's-level courses I (across the whole of the UK, not just Scotland, thus splitting level 6 on the England, Wales and Northern Ireland framework). Foundation degree/HND/DipHE-level qualifications are coded J and HNC/CertHE-level C.

At the FE stage, A-levels and similar level 3 qualifications (including the Scottish Advanced Higher, which is at level 7 on the SCQF, the same as HNCs and CertHEs) are coded P. Lower levels file alphabetically: Q for level 2, R for level 1 and S for entry level. X is used to code non-accredited/non-approved qualifications, Access to HE Diplomas and Welsh for Adults qualifications.

The mapping to the ISCED 1997 international statistical classification levels has research courses at both doctoral and master's level (codes D and L) corresponding to ISCED level 6; taught courses at doctoral, master's and honours level (codes E, M and H) corresponding to level 5A; courses at non-honours bachelor's-level and foundation degree/diploma level (codes I and J) corresponding to level 5B; and courses at certificate level (code C) corresponding to level 5B or level 4. No correspondence is given between the HESA framework and ISCED 1997 levels for FE qualifications.

The national mapping for ISCED gives equivalences for UK qualifications in both the 1997 and 2011 classifications:

Programme	ISCED 1997	ISCED 2011
Early Years Foundation Stage	0	0
Primary School (KS 1–2)	1	1
Basic Skills/Essential Skills	1	1
Key Stage 3/National 1–4/Intermediate 1	2	2
Key Skills/Core Skills	3C	2
Foundation Level Diploma	3C	2
Key Stage 4/National 5/Intermediate 2	3C	3
Higher Level Diploma	3C	3
NVQ Level 1 & 2	3C	3
Apprenticeship (level 2)	3C	3
NVQ Level 3	3B	4
Diploma (Advanced Level)	3B	4
Advanced Apprenticeships	3B	4
AS-level/Higher	3A	4
A-level/Advanced Higher	3A	4
Access to HE Diploma	4	4
NVQ Level 4 & 5	5B	5
HNC/HND/DipHE/Foundation Degree	5B	5
Bachelor's Degree	5A	6
Master's Degree/PGCert/PGDip	5A	7
Doctorate	6	8

=== UK ENIC Band Framework ===
The UK ENIC (European Network of Information Centres) uses a 16-level "band framework" in its evaluation of foreign qualifications to identify comparable British qualifications. UK ENIC issues statements of comparability and certificates based on these bands, which are designed to be precise enough to distinguish between different international awards and assist in informed decision making.

Band	Comparison	RQF/FHEQ	SCQF
15	Post-doctoral/higher doctorate	N/A	N/A
14	PhD/professional doctorate	8	12
13	MPhil/MRes	7	11
12	Master's degree/integrated master's degree/primary qualification in medicine/dentistry/veterinary science	7	11
11	PGCert/PGDip	7	11
10	Bachelor's degree (Honours)/GradCert/GradDip/Scottish Ancients MA (Honours)	6	10
9	Bachelor's degree (Ordinary)/Scottish Ancients MA (Ordinary)	6	9
8	Foundation degree/DipHE/HND	5	8
7	CertHE/HNC	4	7
6	A-level/Scottish Advanced Higher/Scottish Baccalaureate/Advanced Welsh Baccalaureate	3	6–7
5	AS-level/Scottish Higher	3	6
4	Between GCSE and AS-level	Between 2 and 3	Between 5 and 6
3	GCSE (grades A*–C/9–4)/Scottish National 5 (grades A–C)/Intermediate Welsh Baccalaureate	2	5
2	GCSE (grades D–G/3–1)/Scottish National 4/Foundation Welsh Baccalaureate	1	4
1	Below GCSE/Scottish National 3	Entry level 3 for academic and vocational qualifications	3 for academic and vocational qualifications
0	Functional Skills Award/Scottish National 1–2	Entry level 1–2 for academic vocational qualifications, entry level 1–3 for occupational qualifications	1–2 for academic vocational qualifications, 1–3 for occupational qualifications

== See also ==
- English as a second or foreign language
- Common European Framework of Reference for Languages (CEFR)
- Leitch Review of Skills
- European Qualifications Framework
