= Postgraduate certificate =

Type of postgraduate qualification

A postgraduate certificate (abbreviated as PGCert, PG Cert or PGC) is a postgraduate qualification at the level of a master's degree.

Like a postgraduate diploma, it is standard practice to use 'PGCert' as a post-nominal designation after completing the certificate course. Another postgraduate qualification above a bachelor's degree includes the Postgraduate Award (PGA)

== United Kingdom ==
In United Kingdom, postgraduate certificate is a postgraduate qualification at the level of a master's degree (level 7 of the Framework for Higher Education Qualifications in England, Wales and Northern Ireland, level 11 of the Framework for Qualification of Higher Education Institutes in Scotland). Postgraduate certificates require a shorter period of study than master's degrees or postgraduate diplomas, typically equivalent to 225 contact hours or one-third of a full-time academic year. They should not be confused with graduate certificates, which are at the level of a bachelor's degree in the United Kingdom.

Although requirements vary depending on the program, a certificate program represents a focused collection of courses that, when completed, affords the student a record of academic accomplishment in a given discipline or set of related disciplines. The standard entry requirement is a UK honours degree or an equivalent foreign qualification.

=== Postgraduate certificate in Education ===
The Postgraduate Certificate in Education (PGCertEd) is the title used for postgraduate qualifications in education England, Wales and Northern Ireland at the level of master's degrees; in Scotland the title Postgraduate Diploma in Education or Professional Graduate Diploma in Education is used. Professional Certificate in Education is the title used for qualifications at bachelor's degree level.

=== Certificate of postgraduate Studies ===
The Certificate of Postgraduate Studies (CPGS, also called Certificate in Postgraduate Studies or Certificate in Postgraduate Study) is a postgraduate certificate offered by a variety of British universities. It is typically taken as the first year exam of a PhD-course and aims at making sure that the student has learnt the necessary knowledge for successfully working on their PhD.

== Ireland ==
In Ireland a postgraduate certificate (PgCert/Pg.Cert.) is a postgraduate qualification at the level of a master's degree (level 9 of the National Framework for Qualifications). Postgraduate certificates have a typical study duration of maximum two years. The typical standard of entry for a postgraduate certificate programme of study is an honour in an undergraduate degree.
