= Foundation degree =

Academic and vocational qualification in the United Kingdom

A foundation degree is a combined academic and vocational qualification in higher education in the United Kingdom, equivalent to two-thirds of an honours bachelor's degree. Foundation degrees were introduced by the Department for Education and Employment in 2000. They are available in England, Wales and Northern Ireland, and offered by universities, colleges with their own foundation degree awarding powers, and colleges and employers running courses validated by universities.

Foundation degrees must include a pathway for graduates to progress to an honours degree. This may be via joining the final year of a standard three-year course or through a dedicated 'top-up' course. Students can also transfer to other institutions to take a top-up course or the final year of an honours course. It may also be possible for students to join the second year of an honours course in a different but related subject.

== History ==
The need for intermediate higher education qualifications that combined vocational and academic elements was recognised in the Choosing to Change report in 1994 and by the Dearing Report in 1997, while the 1999 Delivering Skills for All report recommended the establishment of two-year vocational associate degrees. They were trialled in 2000, at which point the government expected 80% of the future expansion in higher education to come from foundation degrees. Foundation degrees were formally launched in 2001 and the first students enrolled at the start of the 2001/2 academic year.

Foundation degrees expanded initially, particularly taking market share from other sub-degree qualifications such as Higher National Diplomas, but overall enrollments have declined since 2009. Although the number of students studying foundation degrees at colleges has continued to increase, this has not been sufficient to offset the fall in university courses. This has been blamed on a number of factors such as the introduction, in 2009, of student number controls. This limited the number of students that universities could recruit in a year, rather than the total number on courses. The Foundation Degree Forward quango, which had been set up to promote foundation degrees, closed in 2011.

== Status ==
Foundation degrees are not general degrees but are focused on specific professions. There are no generally-set entry conditions: commercial or industrial experience may be more important in gaining a place than formal qualifications, and experience is always taken into account. They are intended to give comprehensive knowledge in a subject to enable the holder to go on to employment or further study in that field. They are normally offered by universities and further education colleges working in partnership. They are also offered by some companies (in partnership with an awarding body) as training for employees, e.g. McDonald's in partnership with Manchester Metropolitan University.

Foundation degrees are at Level 5 in the Framework for Higher Education Qualifications, below bachelor's degrees at level 6. Courses are typically two years full-time study or longer part-time, and it is often possible to 'top up' to a bachelor's degree with a further year of study. They are at the same level as the older Higher National Diploma (HND) and Diploma of Higher Education (DipHE); however, they have a different emphasis and can only be awarded by institutions that have received research, taught or foundation degree awarding powers from the Privy Council.

According to figures from the Higher Education Statistics Agency, over half of foundation degree graduates are in further study six months after graduating, many presumably 'topping up' to a bachelor's degree, and more than 60% are in employment (there is an overlap of slightly over 20% who are both working and studying). Less than 2.5% of foundation degree holders are unemployed six months after graduating.

Further education colleges who wish to award their own foundation degrees must apply to the Office for Students for degree awarding powers.

== See also ==
- Education in the United Kingdom
- British degree abbreviations
