= T Level =

Technical based qualification in England

T-level
- Type: Technical education
- Year started: 2020
- Duration: 2 years
- Regions: England
- Languages: English language
- Website: www.tlevels.gov.uk

T Levels are technically-based qualifications in England, developed in collaboration with employers and businesses, with content that meets the needs of industry and prepares students for work, further training, or study.

T Levels are two-year courses which can be studied by 16-18 year olds after finishing their studies at GCSE level. T Levels are based on the same standards as apprenticeships, designed by employers and approved by the Institute for Apprenticeships and Technical Education. They are the responsibility of the Minister of State for Skills in the Department for Education.

== History ==
The concept of a unified technical qualification with equal status to A-levels was first raised in a government-commissioned review by Lord Sainsbury. This major education change was announced by the Chancellor of the Exchequer Philip Hammond, in his budget statement in 2017. The proposal was tentatively welcomed by professionals. In September 2020 there were 193 colleges planning to offer some T Levels by 2022. The first qualifications were awarded in August 2022.

Speaking at the October 2023 Conservative Party Conference, Rishi Sunak announced that T Levels and A Levels would be merged to form the Advanced British Standard (ABS). However, the proposed ABS was scrapped by Rachel Reeves after the 2024 United Kingdom general election on financial grounds, so this will not occur.

== Aim and content ==
The aim of a T Level qualification is to improve the teaching and administration of technical education which will enable students to directly enter employment on completion of a programme in further education or sixth form. These qualifications will be a mix of theoretical work learnt in the classroom in a Further Education (FE) College or in a sixth form in a secondary school and two industry practical placements with employers working in partnership with the college or sixth form. The T Levels will be a Level 3 qualification on the Regulated Qualifications Framework.

Students can expect to gain

- a broad knowledge; with skills and behaviours necessary for employment in an occupation or industry related to their field of study
- an opportunity to develop specialist technical skills relevant to at least one occupation
- the relevant English, Maths, Science and Digital skills.

Students can expect to be taught the core subjects of English, Maths, Science and Digital skills. Soft-skills are also embedded into the courses. This will be classroom based. They will learn as well the specialised skills necessary to embark in a career in their chosen field, spending 80% of the overall course in the classroom and the other 20% in a "meaningful industry placement", offering training and 45 days of work experience. The total programme time for the course should be over 1900 hours.

== Reaction ==
The Universities and Colleges Admissions Service (UCAS) has said that the highest T Level qualification, a starred distinction, will be worth the equivalent of three A*s at A Level when a student is being considered for a place in higher education, giving them 168 UCAS points; the highest A Level result is worth 56 points.

== Pathways ==
When announced in 2017, 15 pathways were envisioned:

- Agriculture, Environmental and Animal Care
- Business and Administrative
- Catering and Hospitality
- Childcare and Education
- Construction
- Creative and Design
- Digital
- Engineering and Manufacturing
- Hair and Beauty
- Health and Science
- Legal, Finance and Accounting
- Protective Services
- Sales, Marketing and Procurement
- Social Care
- Transport and Logistics

Digital, construction, education and childcare courses were launched in September 2020, and Health and Science courses in September 2021.

As of January 2026, the following T Levels are available:

- Agriculture, Land Management and Production
- Animal Care and Management
- Management and Administration
- Building Services Engineering for Construction
- Design, Surveying and Planning for Construction
- Craft and Design
- Media, Broadcast and Production
- Digital Data Analytics
- Digital Software Development
- Digital Support and Security
- Education and Early Years
- Design and Development for Engineering and Manufacturing
- Maintenance, Installation and Repair for Engineering and Manufacturing
- Engineering, Manufacturing, Processing and Control
- Health
- Science
- Accounting
- Finance
- Legal Services
- Marketing

== See also ==
- Advanced British Standard, a proposed replacement
- Skills England
