= Diploma of Higher Education =

British and Swedish higher-education qualification

A Diploma of Higher Education (DipHE) is a higher education qualification in the United Kingdom and Sweden.

== Overview ==
=== United Kingdom ===
The Diploma is awarded after two years of full-time study (or equivalent) at a university or other higher education institution, or four years of part-time study. A DipHE is an independent tertiary award, an award in its own right, and students can study for a DipHE in various academic disciplines.

At Level 5 on both the national qualifications framework for England, Wales and Northern Ireland, and the European Qualifications Framework, the DipHE was once seen as the more academic equivalent of the Higher National Diploma, which was perceived as vocational. However, universities have since integrated both qualifications into the first and second years of an undergraduate honours degree, and they can now be considered equivalent.

The Diploma certifies that a student has achieved the minimum standard after conclusion of a second year course of tertiary education in science or the liberal arts. If a student is undertaking a full Bachelor of Arts, a Diploma of Higher Education marks two-thirds of their undergraduate degree. This suggests that the British Diploma ranks ahead of an American Associate of Arts (which in American parlance is a two-year undergraduate, or half of a BA/BS). That being stated, American universities generally consider UK Diplomas equivalent to a college-level Associate of Arts even though a British student typically holds more credit hours (and therefore more study time) in the arts, humanities and/or sciences.

In Scotland, a DipHE is worth 240 credit points (at least 120 at Level 7 and at least 80 at Level 8) on the Scottish Credit and Qualifications Framework. (As a guide, an ordinary degree is worth 360 credit points and an honours degree is worth 480 credit points.)

They are accredited by the universities, except in the case of nurse, community and youth work education where the curriculum is prescribed by the Nursing and Midwifery Council. Holders are permitted to use the postnominals DipHE, sometimes followed by the course name in brackets and the university from which they earned their qualification.

Sometimes, having a DipHE can exempt the holder from some of the requirements of a bachelor's degree; for example, it might reduce the length of study or number of courses necessary to complete the qualification. This typically allows a Diploma holder to obtain a BA/BSc in one-third of the time.

Diplomas are generally awarded on a pass/fail basis, and occasionally are awarded with honours when a student has distinguished themself. The two highest honours are Merit and Distinction.

=== Sweden ===
A Swedish Högskoleexamen (Higher Education Diploma) requires 120 ECTS credits including an independent project (degree project). Additional requirements can be decided by each University or University College, but usually at least 60 ECTS credits are required within the same field of study.

== See also ==
- Certificate of Higher Education
- Diploma
- Higher diploma
