= Certificate of Higher Education =

British higher-education qualification

A Certificate of Higher Education (CertHE) is a higher education qualification in the United Kingdom.

== Overview ==
The Certificate is awarded after one year of full-time study (or equivalent) at a university or other higher education institution, or two years of part-time study. A CertHE is an independent tertiary award, an award in its own right, and students can study for a CertHE in various academic disciplines.

At Level 4 on the national qualifications framework for England, Wales and Northern Ireland, the CertHE was once viewed as the academic equivalent of the Higher National Certificate, which was perceived to be vocational. However, universities have since integrated both qualifications into the first year of an undergraduate honours degree and they now can be considered equivalent academically. Prior to 2015, the CertHE was equivalent to an NVQ Level 4. In Scotland, a CertHE is at Level 7 on the Scottish Credit and Qualifications Framework.

On completion, students are permitted to use the postnominals CertHE, sometimes followed by the course name in brackets and the university from which they earned their qualification.

Sometimes, having a CertHE can exempt the holder from some of the requirements of a bachelor's degree; for example, it might reduce the length of study by one or two years, or reduce the number of courses necessary to complete the qualification.

== Comparison with other qualifications ==
A Certificate of Higher Education (CertHE) is equivalent to the first year of a bachelor's degree which is any Level 4 qualification.

A Diploma of Higher Education (DipHE) is equivalent to the second year of a bachelor's degree or any Level 5 qualification.

== See also ==
- Education in the United Kingdom
