= Educational policies and initiatives of the European Union =

In the European Union education is at the responsibility of its Member States and their Ministries of education that they have; in such, the European Union institutions play only a supporting and overseeing role. According to Art. 165 of the Treaty on the Functioning of the European Union, the Community

shall contribute to the development of quality education by encouraging cooperation between Member States, through actions such as promoting the mobility of citizens, designing joint study programmes, establishing networks, exchanging information or teaching languages of the European Union. The Treaty also contains a commitment to promote life-long learning for all citizens of the Union.

The EU also funds educational, professional and citizenship-building programmes which encourage EU citizens to take advantage of opportunities which the EU offers its citizens to live, study and work in other countries. The best known of these is the Erasmus programme, under which more than 3,000,000 students have taken part in inter-university exchange and mobility over the last 20 years. Since 2000, conscious of the importance of Education and Training for their economic and social objectives, EU Member States have begun working together to achieve specific goals in the field of Education. By sharing examples of good policy practice, by taking part in Peer Learning activities, by setting benchmarks and by tracking progress against key indicators, the 27 Member States aim to respond coherently to common challenges, whilst retaining their individual sovereignty in the field of Education policy. This strategy is referred to as the Education and Training 2020 programme (ET2020), which is an update of the Education and Training 2010 programme. The European Union is also a partner in various inter-governmental projects, including the Bologna Process whose purpose is to create a European higher education area by harmonising academic degree structures and standards as well as academic quality assurance standards throughout EU Member States and in other European countries.

== Building a Europe of knowledge ==
The European Union adopted its first education programme (the COMETT programme, designed to stimulate contacts and exchanges between universities and industry) in July 1987. This programme was rapidly followed by the ERASMUS programme, which promoted inter-university contacts and cooperation, as well as substantial student mobility (as, in 1989, did the "Youth for Europe" programme, the EU's first youth exchange support scheme). These programmes were adopted by the EU countries but with considerable support from the European Parliament which made budgets available even before the legal instruments had been adopted.

The European Union has two different types of instrument to increase the quality and openness of the education and training systems of the EU's Member States: a set of policy instruments through which EU countries are encouraged to develop their own education systems and to learn from each other's successes; and a substantial programme to support exchanges, networks and mutual learning between schools, universities or training centres as well as between the political authorities responsible for these areas in the different Member States.

== Education and training policy ==
The European Union's interest in Education policy (as opposed to Education programmes) developed after the Lisbon summit in March 2000, at which the EU's Heads of State and Government asked the Education Ministers of the EU to reflect on the "concrete objectives" of education systems with a view to improving them. The European Commission and the European Union's Member States worked together on a report for the Spring 2001 European Council, and in 2002 the Spring Summit approved their joint work programme showing how they proposed to take the report's recommendations forward. Since then they have published a series of "Joint Reports" every other year.

The Commission seeks to encourage Member States to improve the quality of their education and training systems in two main ways: through a process of setting targets and publishing the position of Member States in achieving them and by stimulating debate on subjects of common interest. This is done using the process known as the Open Method of Coordination.

=== Target setting ===
As regards target setting, the Member States agreed in the Council on 5 May 2003 on five benchmarks on : early school leavers; number of graduates and decrease of gender imbalance in maths, science and technology; upper secondary education completion; low achievers in reading literacy; lifelong learning.

Under the current policy framework in Education and Policy (ET2020), the seven benchmarks require that by 2020:

1 – Early School Leavers : less than 10% of school pupils should leave school before the end of compulsory schooling

2 – Tertiary education attainment : at least 40% of the population aged 30–34 years should have completed tertiary education

3 – Early childhood education and care : 95% of children aged 4 to the age when primary education starts should participate in early education

4 – Low achievement in Reading, Maths and Science : no more than 15% of 15-year-olds should be low-achievers in reading, maths and science as measured at level 2 in the OECD's Programme for International Student Assessment

5 – Employment rate of recent graduates : 82% of the population aged 20–34, who are no longer in education or training and have successfully completed upper secondary or tertiary education, should be employed

6 – Adult participation in life-long learning : participation of the 25-64 age group in lifelong learning (i.e. formal or non-formal continuing education or training including in-company skills development) should be not less than 15% per annum

7 – Mobility between countries : at least 20% of higher education graduates and 6% of 18- to 34-year-olds with an initial professional qualification should have spent some time studying or training abroad

Since 2012, progress against benchmarks and core indicators is yearly assessed in the Education and Training Monitor, published every autumn by the Directorate-General for Education and Culture in replacement of the Progress Report. The benchmark on Early school leavers and the benchmark on Tertiary education attainment are also Europe 2020 targets.

=== Policy discussions ===
In addition to the measurement of progress, the commission also publishes policy papers designed to encourage the EU's Member States to look more closely at particular areas of their education and training policy. The commission has published such papers over many years, but until the Lisbon Summit in March 2000, few were widely followed. Since then, however, Member States have become more open to mutual exchange and learning, and a number of Commission papers have had significant impact. A recent example (late 2006) may be found in the Communication on "Efficiency and equity in European education and training systems". This paper was generally welcomed by Member States but it drew criticism from some (in particular Germany and Austria) who felt that it commented negatively on their education and training systems.

=== Networking ===
Finally, the commission has supported a variety of networking systems between Ministers (and Ministries) in the EU's Member States, in addition to the thrice yearly meetings of the "Education Council" within the EU's own institutional system. These range from biennial meetings of Ministers responsible for Professional Education (the "Copenhagen Process"), through regular meetings of Director Generals for Higher Education or for Professional Education to more specialised networks or "clusters" within the "Education and Training 2010 programme" in areas such as key competences, foreign language learning or the recognition of informal and non-formal qualifications.

== Education and training programmes ==
=== Inside the EU ===
The first European Union exchange programmes were the COMETT Programme for Industry-University links and exchanges, launched in 1987 (and discontinued in 1995); the Erasmus university exchange programme was launched in the same year. Similar programmes have been running ever since, and as from 2007 all the education and training programmes were brought together in one single programme; the Lifelong Learning Programme 2007-2013. The Lifelong Learning programme comprises separate sub-programmes for schools; universities and higher education; professional education; adult education; teaching about the EU in universities; and a 'horizontal' programme for policy development.

The schools exchange programme, named after the 15th century Czech teacher, scientist and educator John Amos Comenius, has helped over 2.5 million school students take part in joint projects across boundaries. The Erasmus programme (named after Desiderius Erasmus, the 16th century Dutch humanist and theologian), has been the icon of university exchange programmes since its launch in 1987. Some two million students have so far spent a fully accredited period of between 3 months and an academic year in another EU university under the programme, which has become a symbol of Europe in universities. The professional education programme is named after the renaissance inventor and all-rounder Leonardo da Vinci. It currently helps around 75,000 young people each year to do an apprenticeship or internship in another EU country. The adult education programme, named after Pastor N. F. S. Grundtvig, the 19th century Danish theologian, poet, philosopher and thinker, helps those involved in adult education to have access to similar international experience. The sub-programme which supports teaching about Europe in higher education is named after the French politician and architect of European Unity, Jean Monnet.

The programme entered into force on 1 January 2007, and will continue until projects launched in its final year 2013 are closed – probably in 2016.

Educational levels across EU regions have become more similar, which has played an important role in increasing employment rates within the European Union. The number of young people not in education, employment, or training (NEETs), notably women, is significantly higher in cohesion regions (less developed regions of Europe) than the EU average (11.2 percent in 2023). Lower educational achievement in these places is exacerbated by relatively low levels of reading and numeracy among young people.

=== Outside the EU ===
The first EU programme to promote educational exchange and cooperation between educational institutions inside the EU and those outside it was the TEMPUS programme, adopted on 7 May 1990 by the Council as part of the assistance provided by the European Community of the day to the countries breaking free of Soviet rule.

The idea behind TEMPUS was that individual universities in the European Community could contribute to the process of rebuilding free and effective university systems in partner countries; and that a bottom-up process through partnerships with individual universities in these countries would provide a counterweight to the influence of the much less trusted Ministries, few of which had by then undergone serious change since Soviet domination. The programme was an immediate success; and by 1993 the number of participating countries had grown from five at the start to eleven. The programme was subsequently enlarged to include the Newly Independent States of the former Soviet Union; again to include the countries of the Western Balkans; and finally to cover the Mediterranean countries.

The TEMPUS programme currently supports projects run by consortia of universities in the EU and in partner countries which aim to update curricula and teaching methods; to improve academic management (e.g., strategic development plans, systems of quality assessment and assurance); and to promote the higher education priorities of its partner countries. It also provides Individual Mobility Grants to enable individuals to travel to or from Europe in connection with these themes. The TEMPUS programme is still running, but will be renewed and revised as from 2007.

TEMPUS was followed by a series of smaller programmes built more round the mobility of academics towards the EU. These included the ALFA/ALBAN programmes with Latin American universities; the Asia-Link programme; and others, sometimes time-limited. A number of these appear to have been set up as a means of development assistance rather than with the development of universities as such, an impression strengthened by the fact that they were managed by the European Commission's development assistance service EuropeAid rather than (like TEMPUS or Erasmus Mundus programme) by its Education and Culture department.

Finally, in 2003 the European Union launched the Erasmus Mundus programme, a project to ensure the place of European Universities as centres of excellence across the world; to attract the best students from around the world to Europe; and to enable partnerships between European universities and those in other countries. The programme had strong support both from the Council of Ministers and from the European Parliament. The first phase of Erasmus Mundus will finish in 2008. The commission has announced its intention to propose a further period. Europe Study Centre (ESC) has lately come up as a reputed and dependable company in Indian providing end to end services in the European overseas education field helping Indian students to avail the Erasmus Mundus benefits.

== See also ==
Pepin, Luce (2006). The history of European cooperation in education and training. Luxembourg: European Commission. ISBN 92-894-8986-3

- Directorate-General for Education and Culture
- Bologna process
- Education and Training 2010
- Lisbon Strategy
- European credit transfer system
- European Day of Languages
- European Studies
- European School
- European higher education area
- The Eurydice Network
- Global Education Network Europe
- Lifelong Learning Programme 2007-2013
- The Comenius programme – relating to primary and secondary education.
- The Erasmus programme – relating to higher education.
- The Leonardo da Vinci programme – relating to professional education
- The Grundtvig programme – relating to adult education.
- Ploteus
- The TEMPUS programme
- Cultural policies of the European Union
- European Cross Media Academy
- Delors Report
- Franco-German University
