= Lifelong Learning Programme 2007–2013 in Finland =

The Lifelong Learning Programme 2007–2013 in Finland consisted of the Finnish participation in the Lifelong Learning Programme 2007–2013 of the European Union.

The program was coordinated by a unit of the Ministry of Education and Culture, Finland, the Centre for International Mobility. Finland has been a member of the European Union since 1 January 1995, and has taken part in the previous educational programmes.

== Educational level oriented programmes ==
- The Comenius programme for improving teaching and learning skills and improving mobility of teachers and students in the EU, to which is devoted 15% of the total Finnish budget for these programs. Some of the participating educational units in Finland:
  - Ahmon koulu, Siilinjärvi, an upper primary school
  - Helsingin medialukio, Helsinki, the Mind the Gap – three European Generations project together with German, Italian, Norwegian, Polish and Spanish participating schools
  - Härkävehmaan koulu, Hyvinkää, an internationalisation course; drafting an article to the paper of the foreign sister school and preparing a ten-minute video presentation
  - Kaitaan lukio, Espoo, a secondary school
  - Kiuruveden yläkoulu, Kiuruvesi municipality, an upper primary school
  - Lapin ammattiopisto, Rovaniemi, the VOICE project with Bladel of the Netherlands and Göttingen of Germany, a secondary level vocational school
  - Martinniemen päiväkoti, Haukipudas, a kindergarten
  - Myrskylän Kirkonkylän koulu, Myrskylä, the project "Coast to Country to Culture" with Cliftonville Primary (Ulster), CEIP Miraflores (Spain) and Merivälja Kool (Estonia).
  - Myllytullin koulu, Oulu, an upper primary school
  - Nurmon yläaste, Nurmo of Seinäjoki town, an upper primary school
  - Ruoveden Yhteiskoulu, Ruovesi, an upper primary school, classes 7–9
- the ERASMUS programme, with 45% of the budget. A number of educational units in Finland participate:
- the Grundtvig programme, with 4% of the budget
- the Leonardo da Vinci programme, for encouraging artistic and creative activity, with 25% of the budget
  - participating educational units in Finland

== Transversal programmes ==
- the transversal programme, with 5% of the budget Some of the participating educational units in Finland are:
- the Jean Monnet programme, for encouraging research in European integration, with 2% of the budget. Some of the participating educational units in Finland are:
