= The Learning Teacher Network =

European non-profit association

- Company type: Non-Profit Organization
- Industry: Education
- Founded: 2002
- Area served: International
- Website: www.learningteacher.eu

The Learning Teacher Network is a European non-profit, member-based education network and association, which performs as a European platform for professional debate in the vanguard of educational progress. The network works closely with UNESCO in Quality Education and the implementation of the Global Action Programme for Education for Sustainable Development (GAP/ESD).

== History ==
The Learning Teacher Network started in 2002 as a Comenius programme 3 Network within the European Socrates Programme. The network was composed of 26 partner institutions from ten European countries and worked in the thematic area of the new role of the teacher.

During the period funded by the European Commission the network successfully organised annual international conferences, published three state of art publications, and arranged European in-service training courses, as well as European contact seminars.

In 2006 the Learning Teacher Network was transformed to an independent, non-profit and membership based educational and international association and network.

In 2009 during the European Year of Creativity and Innovation, the Learning Teacher Network was awarded the European Gold Award by the European Commission as being the best project within the entire EU Lifelong Learning Programme, category Comenius.

From 2015 the Learning Teacher Network is an official UNESCO GAP Key Partner, working in the implementation of the UNESCO Global Action Programme for Education for Sustainable Development (GAP/ESD) in the capacity building of educators and trainers.

== Structure and governance ==
The Learning Teacher Network is an association of individuals, organisations and educational institutions in education and training. The network is formally composed of members with either individual or institutional membership but organises also a wider circle of individuals who link up, give active support or participate in network activities.

The network is managed and coordinated by an international Executive Committee.

For the carrying out of activities, the network has each one Editorial board for the publications, working committees and thematic groups, and national representatives in 34 European countries. The supreme body of the network is the Annual General Meeting.

== Mission ==
The mission of the Learning Teacher Network is to empower and build capacity of 'The Teacher of Tomorrow' as agent for sustainable education and transformation in society. The network's motto is Trust, Respect and Fun .

== Publications ==
=== The Learning Teacher Magazine ===
Launched in 2010, The Learning Teacher Magazine (ISSN 2000-2610) is a quarterly illustrated publication targeting teachers and leaders at schools and teacher education.

=== The Learning Teacher Journal ===
Since 2009 The Learning Teacher Journal (ISSN 1654-0344) is a peer-reviewed academic journal.

== International conferences, seminars and European training courses ==
Since 2004 the Learning Teacher Network organises annual international conferences and European in-service training courses given within the framework of the EU Programme for education and training (The Lifelong Learning Programme 2007-2013 followed by Erasmus+ 2014-2020). In addition, from 2014 and onwards the network organises annual, international seminars in support the UNESCO Global Action Programme.
