= Ch Foundation =

Swiss inter-cantonal organization

The ch Foundation for Federal Cooperation is a Swiss inter-cantonal organization under private law. It is sponsored by all 26 cantons and has its head office in Solothurn. The Foundation's Board of Trustees is composed of 26 members of the individual cantonal governments. Founded in 1967, the Foundation is committed to promoting the principle of federalism. It supports cooperation between the cantons and with the Confederation. As part of its work, it runs the Haus der Kantone (House of Cantons) in Berne, manages the secretariat of the Conference of Cantonal Governments (CCG), and organizes training courses for members of the cantonal governments.

The ch Foundation also encourages links between the different linguistic communities in Switzerland, and works to protect the country's diverse languages and cultures. With the ch Series project, it has promoted the translation of contemporary Swiss literature since 1974, and has been involved in exchange programmes both within Switzerland and internationally since 1976.

The ch Foundation now offers a broad range of exchange programmes in Switzerland, in Europe and internationally in general and vocational education and training, and in extracurricular youth work. The Swiss exchange programmes include Pestalozzi (primary and lower secondary schools), Rousseau (upper secondary schools) and Piaget (vocational training). The European programmes are Comenius (primary to upper secondary schools), Erasmus (university-level institutions), Leonardo da Vinci (professional/vocational training), Grundtvig (adult education) and Youth in Action (extracurricular youth work).

GO is the Swiss Competence Centre for Exchange and Mobility. It is run by the ch Foundation. It advises and supports programme participants before, during and after their projects. In addition, it provides them with contacts, and may even offer help with funding, depending on the programme concerned. These services are based on two mandates from the Swiss Confederation: that of 2010 from the State Secretariat for Education, Research and Innovation to implement the European Lifelong Learning (LLP) and Youth in Action programmes, as well as that of the Federal Office of Culture for domestic exchange programmes (since 2011).

Benedikt Würth, member of the cantonal government of St. Gallen, became Chairman of the ch Foundation in 2013. Sandra Maissen is the Foundation's Managing Director.
