= Ploteus =

PLOTEUS logo

PLOTEUS is an acronym of Portal on Learning Opportunities Throughout European Space, meant to connote πλωτηρ (ploter) which means "navigator" in ancient Greek. It is a European Union web portal, coordinated by the European's Commission Directorate-General for education and culture, that aims to help citizens find out about education and training opportunities, throughout the countries belonging to the European Union, Switzerland, Iceland, Norway and Turkey, though the latter did not participate in PLOTEUS at its launch, as it was not a member of the Leonardo da Vinci programme yet. According to France 5, the portal offers an "easy access" to an "excellent source of information" from primary school to postgraduate education. PLOTEUS has been prioritised as a "project of common interest" by the European Commission (Commission Decision of 23 December 2002, article 8.2.c). The European Parliament and the European Council have confirmed in 2006 their "support for transnational web-based services such as PLOTEUS". The portal is run by the Euroguidance network, financed by the Leonardo da Vinci programme, and is interconnected with EURES, the European Commission's portal on job mobility information. Both PLOTEUS and EURES are considered as examples of "pan-European services". After the launch of PLOTEUS and EURES in 2003, the Bologna process drive to favour student mobility in Europe wa further expressed in 2004 by the launch of the Europass program, which is accessible from the EURES portal, as well as PLOTEUS.

== Genesis of the project (2000–2003) ==
The project was initiated in 2001, further to the conclusions of the Lisbon and Stockholm European Councils (March 2000 and March 2001), as part of the Bologna process, with the purpose to put into effect the right to freedom of movement for European citizens by providing the necessary information on learning opportunities called for by the Conclusions of the 2000 Lisbon Council and making national service inter-operable throughout Europe. It was developed by Atos. The total development cost was €849,000, while the yearly running cost was initially estimated at €250,000.

== PLOTEUS I (2003–2005) ==
The portal was officially launched in March 2003 by Viviane Reding, the Commissioner for Education, Culture, Youth, Media and Sport, during an informal meeting of the ministries for education in Athens. According to the European Commissioner, the project "makes it easier to find the necessary information to study and train in another part of Europe" It provided information on education systems, qualifications, grants and tuition fees in the EEC countries. It also provided practical help on matters such as finding a place to stay, living costs, the legal aspects of studying abroad, taxes, and social security as well as facilitating exchange programmes and the process of moving from one Member State to another. In this first phase, the portal provided access to about 5,000 links available in 11 languages. Approximately 60,000 entries were registered by the end of 2003. People with disabilities were prioritised as a target group. At this stage, it did not directly provide information about single courses but pointed the user toward websites and/or databases, where the required information could be found. The disadvantage of this solution was that it required the user to access different websites with different user interfaces, and of course different classification systems, languages and educational models. In a report of January 2004, the European Commission stated PLOTEUS I was "only the first step, to be followed by a service which will offer citizens direct access to information on learning opportunities, by making national services inter-operable throughout Europe. After discussion with the competent national authorities, a tender has been launched and the development work will start early in 2004." The number of visits, estimated in June 2003 at between 1,500 and 2,000 per day, reached 60,000 per month in 2005. According to 2004 external evaluation, the PLOTEUS portal was considered by 2 thirds of the users "useful for their work". Nevertheless, according to a paper published in 2006, though "laudable in its aims to help citizens find out information about studying in Europe", the PLOTEUS portal "presents learners with a bewildering assortment of learning opportunities, each leading the enquirer to the vagaries of providers' websites [and] none of the information offered to learners is standardised or predictable, making it difficult to determine which goals can be reached by which routes". Another paper criticised the fact these "important instruments" did not exist everywhere and were not completely available in English.

== PLOTEUS II (2006–2008) ==
The aim of the second phase was to make it possible to query directly the content of national databases through the interface of the European portal, and thus to obtain in PLOTEUS direct answers to specific queries about single courses. In order to interconnect national databases in the European portal, a common protocol was developed by member states, using clusterpoint. The site provided as of December 2006 more than 7,000 links to existing information resources in 31 countries and was available in 24 languages. As of 2009, it received, depending on sources, between 800,000 and over 1,000,000 visits per year. In 2010, its promotion was incorporated in the Youth on the Move campaign launched by the European Commission to extend opportunities for learning mobility to all young people in Europe by 2020. The EEC council recommendation of 28 June 2011 stated member states should "cooperate with the Commission to further develop and update the PLOTEUS portal on learning opportunities, namely by increasing the number of national information resources that citizens can directly access through the multilingual Ploteus interface".

== Assessment ==
According to a paper by Ignaco Criado in 2011, the PLOTEUS project is "one of the most relevant" example of "pan-European eGovernment services" developed during the last years in the EEC : it "has enabled the retrieval of comparable data from different national data sources, which required a common protocol for categorization approved by the Commission and member states. On the basis of the follow-up study of this program, an interconnection of national databases has been implemented using web services as a technical solution. Thus, data are updated at national level, and the PLOTEUS portal accesses national databases for information required to answer citizen requests". Another paper considers the project as an example of "convergence and europeanization of public administration". Nevertheless, another paper suggests PLOTEUS does not play an important role in students' decision-making process in case of exchange programs.

== See also ==
- Bologna process
- Educational policies and initiatives of the European Union
- Europass
- European Qualifications Framework
- Eurydice Network
- Leonardo da Vinci programme
- Lifelong Learning Programme 2007–2013
- Lisbon Strategy
- Socrates programme
