= Cultural policies of the European Union =

European Union culture policies aim to address and promote the cultural dimension of European integration through relevant legislation and government funding. These policies support the development of cultural activity, education or research conducted by private companies, NGOs and individual initiatives based in the European Union working in the fields of cinema and audiovisual, publishing, music and crafts.

The European Commission runs Culture Programme (2007–2013), and the EU funds other cultural bodies such as the European Cultural Month, the Media Programme, the European Union Youth Orchestra and the European Capital of Culture programme.

The EU awards grants to cultural projects (233 in 2004) and has launched a web portal dedicated to Europe and Culture, responding to the European Council's expressed desire to see the Commission and the member states "promote the networking of cultural information to enable all citizens to access European cultural content by advanced technological means."

== History and development ==
The Council of Europe, which is distinct from the European Union (EU), first formalised cultural cooperation policy in Europe with its European Cultural Convention.

However, European Union-affiliated cultural policy, promoting unified cooperation between member states was first initiated with the 1992 Maastricht Treaty.

Currently, a cultural contact point (CCP) is established in each EU member state, responsible for facilitating communication between the European Commission's Cultural Programme and each member state.

== Institutions and bodies ==
The most important EU institutions through which decisions are made regarding cultural policies are:

- the European Commission acting in the areas of culture, sport and languages,
- the Committee on Culture and Education of the European Parliament,
- the Education, Youth and Culture sector of the Council of the European Union,
- and the Education, Audiovisual and Culture Executive Agency of the European Commission.

=== List of institutions and bodies ===
The EU promotes cultural development through numerous institutions, civil society organisations and networks such as:

- Cinema of Europe
- Committee on Culture and Education
- Directorate-General for Education and Culture
- Education, Audiovisual and Culture Executive Agency
- Euranet
- Europa Nostra - foundation
- European Audiovisual Observatory
- European Commission
- European Commissioner for Education, Culture, Multilingualism and Youth
- European Film Promotion
- European Institute of Cultural Routes - network
- European League of Institutes of the Arts - network
- European Network of Information Centres - network
- European Union National Institutes for Culture
- European Union Youth Orchestra - network
- Union of the Theatres of Europe - network
- European Network of Cultural Centres - network
- Trans Europe Halles - network
- European Festival Association - network
- European Composer & Songwriter Alliance - ECSA - network
- European Choral Association - Europa Cantat EV - network
- Informal European Theatre Meeting - network
- Federation for European Storytelling - network
- Europe Jazz Network - network
- Club de Directores de Arte de Europa (Arts Director Club of Europe) ADCE - network
- Convention Theatrale Europeenne - network
- European Dancehouse Network - network
- European network on cultural management and policy (ENCATC) - network
- Eurozine - Network of European Cultural Journals
- Amateo the European Network for Active Participation in Cultural Activities Arts Take Part - Active Participation for Creative Europe
- Live (DMA) - network
- European Route of Industrial Heritage) - network
- European Music Council) - network
- Reseau Europeen de Musique Ancienne) - network
- Conseil des Architectes d'Europe) - network
- Association Europenne des Conservatoires, Academies de Musique et Musikhochschulen AEC) - network
- Circostrada) - network
- Secretariat de Jeunesses Musicales International JMI) - network

=== List of programmes ===
The EU promotes cultural development through numerous programmes such as:

- Culture 2000
- Erasmus Mundus
- Erasmus Programme
- Europa coin programme
- European Capital of Culture
- European Cultural Month
- European Cultural Route
- European Heritage Days
- European Library
- Europeana
- EUscreen
- MEDIA Programme
- Modul-dance
- Protected areas of the European Union
- Video Active

European Cultural Month ran from 1990-2008 to promote culture, mainly for the Central and Eastern European countries.

=== List of awards ===
The EU promotes cultural development through the policy of awards:

- Aristeion Prize
- Civis media prize
- Europe Book Prize
- European Border Breakers Award
- European Inventor of the Year
- European IST Grand Prize
- European Union Prize for Contemporary Architecture
- European Union Prize for Literature
- Lux Prize
- Young European of the Year

=== List of non-EU cultural institutions, bodies and programmes ===
The following is a list of European institutions, bodies and programmes which may be thought to be related to the EU/EU policy, but are not:

- Arte
- Council of Europe
- Compendium of cultural policies and trends in Europe
- Eurocities
- EUROFRAME
- Europalia
- European Broadcasting Union
- European Cultural Foundation
- European Dancehouse Network
- European Film Academy
- European Museum Forum
- University Network of the European Capitals of Culture

== Policies by sector ==
=== Arts and culture ===
The European Commission runs the EU's Culture Programme, which typically runs in 7 year intervals. The last Culture Programme was called Culture 2000. For the next Culture Programme (2007-2013) was spent €400 million. Current program is called Creative Europe (2014-2020).

=== Sports ===
Sport is largely the domain of the member states, with the EU mostly playing an indirect role. Recently the EU launched an anti-doping convention. The role of the EU might increase in the future, if (for example) the Treaty of Lisbon were to be ratified by all member states. Other policies of the EU have affected sports, such as the freedom of employment which was at the core of the Bosman ruling, which prohibited national football leagues from imposing quotas on foreign players with EU nationality.

=== Languages ===
The languages of the European Union are languages used by people within the member states of the European Union. They include the 24 official languages of the European Union plus many others. EU policy is to encourage all its citizens to be multilingual; specifically, it encourages them to be able to speak two languages in addition to their mother tongue. The reason for this is not only to promote easier communication between Europeans, but also to encourage greater tolerance and respect for diversity. A number of EU funding programmes actively promote language learning and linguistic diversity. The content of educational systems remains the responsibility of individual member states. Further information can be found at language policy.

== See also ==
- Bologna Process
- Cultural policy
- Culture of Europe
- Educational policies and initiatives of the European Union
- European Communities
- Europeanisation
- Greater Region
- Lifelong Learning Programme 2007–2013
- Religion in the European Union
- Trans-cultural diffusion
