= European League of Institutes of the Arts =

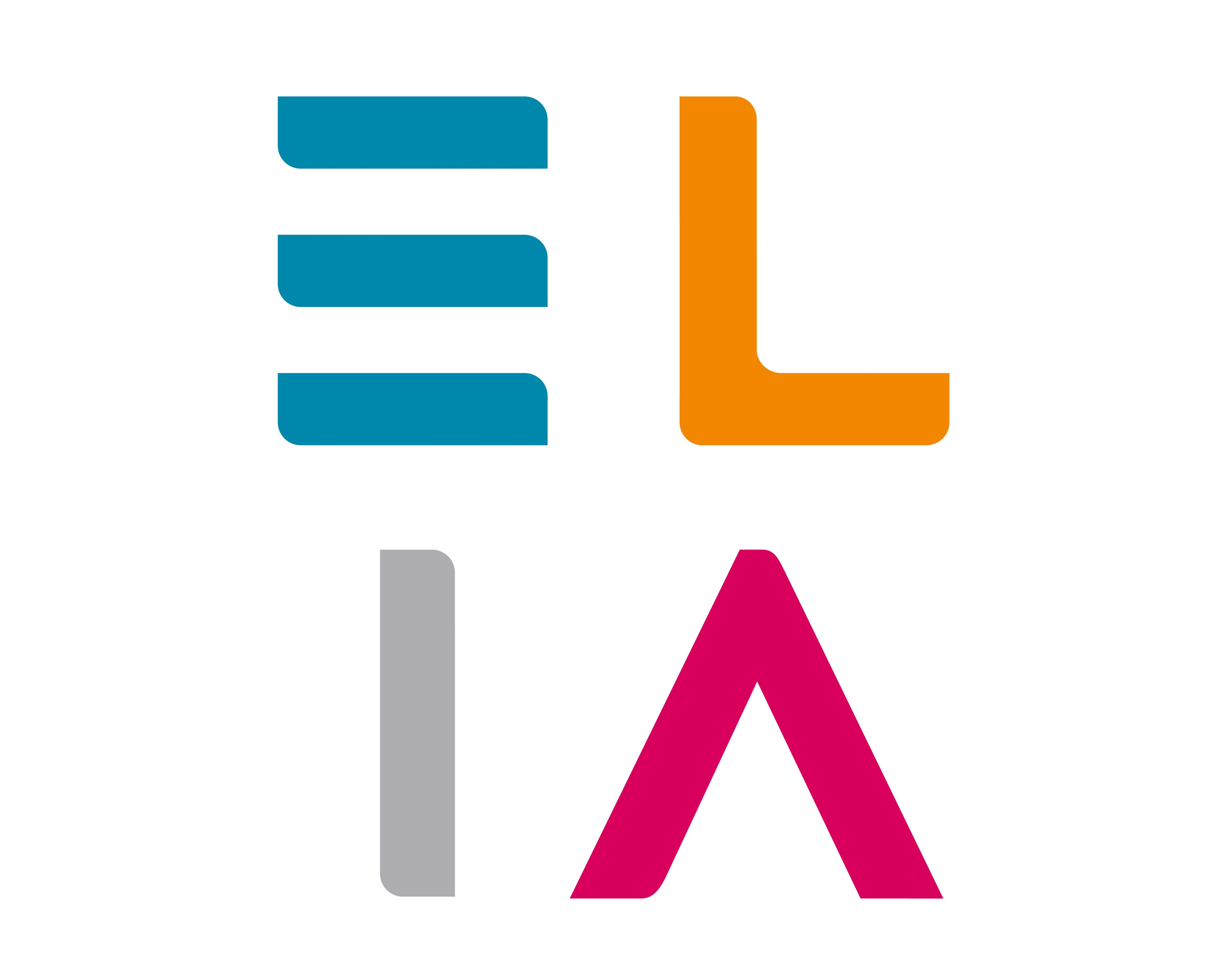
- Formation: 1990
- Headquarters: Amsterdam, Netherlands
- President: Andrea B. Braidt
- Treasurer: Marjanne Paardekooper
- Executive Director: Maria Hansen
- Website: www.elia-artschools.org

ELIA (formerly known as the European League of Institutes of the Arts) represents some 300,000 students in all art disciplines.

== History ==
ELIA emerged from a conference organized in Amsterdam in 1990, Imagination and Diversity, which promoted cooperation in art education around Europe. The organiser of the conference and founder of ELIA, Carla Delfos, was the organization's first Executive Director. She was knighted Chevalier des Arts et des Lettres in 1993, and received honorary doctorates from Robert Gordon University, Aberdeen in 2001, and Columbia College Chicago in 2009.

In 1991, ELIA helped to found the European Forum for Arts and Heritage (EFAH). In the same year, a conference in Budapest, in the wake of the fall of the Iron Curtain, opened up vistas for collaboration with Eastern Europe. At ELIA's second General Assembly in Strasbourg 1992, the Manifesto for Arts Education in Europe was approved. A new version was approved in 2000. In 1996, ELIA was designated to organize a ‘Thematic Network for Higher Arts Education’ as part of the SOCRATES programme. Thematic Networks for closer collaboration and research have since been central to ELIA's activities.

Following the Bologna Declaration in 1999, these networks have been crucial in facilitating discussion and taking a position on the implications of the Bologna Process for higher arts education. To this end, ELIA has been cooperating closely with the European Association of Conservatoires (AEC), publishing four position papers together.

In 2008, ELIA received a European grant for a new multi-year project, Art Futures. It was renewed in 2011. In 2015, ELIA launched a 3-year Creative Europe co-funded project NXT Making a Living from the Arts, which ended in April 2018.

== Structure ==
The main branches of the organization:
ELIA members participate in various ELIA projects and events. They are encouraged to network and share information not only during ELIA events, but also with the network via the ELIA website.

The Representative Board consists of a maximum of 21 members elected during the General Assembly from and by registered full members of the organisation, ensuring a proportional representation of disciplines and regions. The Representative Board elects the President and Treasurer. The tenure is for a period of two years.

The Executive Board, including the President, comprises a maximum of nine members chosen from the Representative Board.

The Executive Office, currently residing in Amsterdam, coordinates daily affairs, project manages the events in cooperation with local partners and handles all membership requests and related inquiries.

=== The ELIA Board ===
The ELIA members are represented by the Representative Board, max. 21 members, which is elected by the General Assembly. From this Representative Board, an Executive Group of 5-9 members is elected, which monitors the activities carried out by the office and various steering groups. The Executive Group includes the President, Vice-President, Treasurer, and Executive Director. Board members are elected for a period of two years. Members of the Board and Executive Group can be re-elected up to a maximum of ten years; the President only once.

Year	President	Executive Director	Vice-President	Treasurer
2018-2020	to be elected	Maria Hansen (since 2017)	to be elected	to be elected
2016–2018	Thomas D. Meier	Carla Delfos (since 1990)	Paula Crabtree	Bridget Kievits
2014–Present	Thomas D. Meier	Carla Delfos (since 1990)	Paula Crabtree	Bridget Kievits
2010 - 2014	Kieran Corcoran			
2006 - 2010	Chris Wainwright			
2004 - 2006	Maarten Regouin			
2000 - 2004	John Butler			
1996 - 2000	Chantal de Smet			
1994 - 1996	Martin Rennert			
1992 - 1994	Johan A. Haarberg			
1990 - 1992	Patrick Talbot			

=== Membership Structure ===
ELIA has three types of membership: full, associate, and non-European. Full members have the right vote during the General Member's Assembly at the ELIA Biennial. Non-European members have all rights equal to full members, except the right to vote. Associate members are institutions that do not fulfill the requirements to be full members and to natural as well as legal persons.

ELIA has over 300 members in 47 countries, it represents some 300,000 students in all art disciplines around the world.

== Activities & projects ==
On a regular bases ELIA offers the following activities and services to its members:

- Organises three core events and multiple small-scale regional events to address relevant topics and issues within higher arts education across all disciplines, such as digitality in teaching and learning, and resilience in arts education and society at large.
- Helps the higher arts education sector take the next steps on content issues such as artistic research and art in education
- Advocates for higher arts education on a European level by actively participating in the discussion with policymakers and relevant stakeholders in Brussels.
- Matchmakes and connects its members to facilitate cooperation on (inter)national projects.
- Initiates and supports European funded projects or projects relevant to its members.
- Offers an online knowledge platform with regular updates on funding opportunities and job adverts, and initiatives and news of its members.
- Publishes conference proceedings, position papers, books and materials on topics that are important to the sector and its members.

=== Events ===
Together with its member institutions, ELIA initiates conferences, symposia, publications and research projects, targeting all sectors of the higher arts education community - artists, teachers, leaders, managers and students - as well as the wider public.

These events include:

- The ELIA Biennial Conference - a world-class event profiling current developments in higher arts education and facilitating dialogue.
- The ELIA Academy (formerly Teacher's Academy) - an international platform for ideas and practices for teachers in art schools in Europe and beyond.
- The Leadership Symposium - a meeting of selected leaders and key decision makers representing a diverse set of arts and design institutions throughout the world.
- NEU NOW Festival - a four-day international arts festival based in Amsterdam, that celebrates emerging artists who are alumni of ELIA member institutions.

Apart from these multi-day events, ELIA has organized many symposia and workshops, and other large conferences, as in Chicago (2010), Tallinn (2007), Berlin (2005), and Tilburg (2003).

- NXT-Making a Living from the Arts - a series of residencies (Amsterdam and Vienna) and a conference focusing on cultural entrepreneurship. On 12 April 2018, the NXT Project officially wrapped up during the NXT Seminar Making a Living from the Arts in 2025 and launched a publication entitled Careers in the arts: Visions for the future.

ELIA Biennial venues

1990	1992	1994	1996	1998	2000	2002	2004	2006	2008	2010	2012	2014	2016
Amsterdam	Strasbourg	Berlin	Lisbon	Helsinki	Barcelona	Comhár	Luzern	Ghent	Gothenborg	Nantes	Vienna	Glasgow	Florence

=== Projects, Partnerships and Publications ===
One of ELIA's most successful projects was SHARE (Step-Change for Higher Arts Research and Education) - an international networking project, with 39 contributing partners in 36 countries, and structural support from the EU, working together on enhancing the '3rd cycle' of arts research and education.

NXT - Making a living from the arts, an ongoing project that supports emerging artists to initiate successful international careers, improving their capacity to make a living from their artistic production.

EQ-Arts is an independent foundation and is an affiliate of ENQA. Founded by ELIA, it collaborates with the EUA and has co-operation agreements with a.o. SKVC Lithuania, the Estonian Higher Education Quality Agency and AQ Vienna/Austria. Through its activities (projects, training programmes, workshops, external peer reviews and accreditation procedures) EQ-Arts supports higher arts education institutions in the self-evaluation and enhancement of their internal quality systems to promote a strong quality culture across the higher arts education sector.

ELIA is deeply concerned with the implications of the Bologna Process for higher arts education: it has published a handbook and various position papers on the topic, and contributed to European projects in Quality Assurance and the assessment of Art degrees. Moreover, it has surveyed the development of innovative MA and PhD programmes, particularly in the field of Artistic Research, which has been the topic of a 2005 conference and 2008 strategy paper.

== See also ==
- Creative industries
- Cultural policies of the European Union
- Lifelong Learning programme
- SOCRATES programme
- Creative Europe

== Publications ==
- ArtFutures: Current Issues in Higher Arts Education (2010) ISBN 978-90-810357-4-3
- Peer Power: The Future of Higher Arts Education in Europe (2010) ISBN 978-90-810357-3-6
- Reminder: speeches and reflections from the 10th ELIA Biennial (2009)
- ...I see you: The Language of the Arts and Intercultural Dialogue (2008)
- Tapping into the potential of Higher Arts Education in Europe (2008) ISBN 978-90-810357-2-9
- Teachers’ Academy Papers (2007) eds. Anne Boddington & David Clews ISBN 978-1-905593-07-1
- New Practices, New Pedagogies (2005) ed. Malcolm Miles ISBN 0-415-36618-6
- SHARE Handbook for Artistic Research Education(2013) ISBN 978-90-810357-0-5
- Florence Principles On the Doctorate in the Arts
- Careers in the arts: Visions for the Future
