= György Kárpáti (film director) =

Hungarian film director (born 1933)

- Born: July 3, 1933; Budapest, Hungary
- Died: June 3, 2023; Budapest, Hungary

György Kárpáti (born 3 July 1933 in Budapest) was a Hungarian film director whose most celebrated feature film is Nem szoktam hazudni (I Hardly Ever Lie, 1966). Over the last five decades of his life, he directed around 200 films, including documentaries, feature films, short films and commercials. His films won several awards at major international film festivals, and he received the Hungarian Programme of the Year award eight times for his television programmes.

== Career ==
György Kárpáti received his first degree in medicine in 1957 and his second degree in film directing in 1964. He was employed until 1991 as a film director by the MAFILM-MOVI studios of the Hungarian state film industry. As a freelance producer-director he was responsible for more than 300 productions for the Hungarian Television Network, including comedies, music shows, documentaries, scientific programmes, live broadcasts, variety shows, and programmes on jazz and the cinema. From 1973-83 he was commissioned by the International Committee of the Red Cross to shoot documentaries in 80 countries over five continents. From his graduation in 1964 until his retirement in 1999 he taught non-fiction directing and editing at the Academy of Drama and Film (SzFF) in Budapest.

== Honours ==
As a member of the Executive Board of the European League of Institutes of the Arts (ELIA), he was made Chevalier of the Ordre des Arts et des Lettres by the government of France in 1992 and of the Order of the White Rose of Finland in 1998, both distinctions given for his contribution to European art teaching and for bilateral cultural relations.

== Filmography ==
- Mese (1962)
- A póráz két végén (1963)
- Nem fog fájni (1964)
- Kontraszt (1964)
- Hajrá, Bikavér (1964)
- Búcsú a fővárosban (1965)
- Próbafelvétel (1966)
- Nem szoktam hazudni (1966)
- Szirtaki (1968)
- Kórtünet (1969)
- Cirkusz a jégen (1969)
- Kis lakás nagy gond (1970)
- Ne a gyerek előtt! (1970)
- Hamis illúziók (1970)
- Nyár, ifjúság (1970)
- Pergő képek (1971-1979)
- Hogyan segítsünk a bűnözőknek? (1971)
- Helyi gyulladásgátlók (1972)
- Cézár és Cecília (1972)
- Kutyabaj (1972)
- Híradástechnika (1973)
- Az öröklés titkai (1974)
- Glóbusz kis hibával (1974)
- Szép, tiszta Budapest (1974)
- Mozdulj! (1975)
- Katasztrófák (1975)
- Születésünk titkai (1976)
- Lángelmék a szigeten (1976)
- Vöröskereszt a világon mindenütt fiatal (1976)
- Ruanda (1976)
- Mama, hallod? (1976)
- Vöröskereszt tagtoborzó (1978)
- Kicsi vagyok én! (1978)
- A mikroelektronika világa (1978)
- Győr, a három folyó városa (1978)
- Ez a Maxim (1979-1985)
- Vöröskereszt mindenütt, mindenkinek (1979)
- A gyermek mosolyáért (1979)
- Jövőnk titkai (1980)
- Pori Jazz (1980-?)
- Hogyan vezessük tévútra embertársainkat? (1980)
- Száz év emberség (1981)
- Akarat, és... (1982)
- Az Apokalipszis lovagjai (1984)
- A bizalom jele (1984)
- A bika jegyében (1985)
- Fejezetek a magyar repülés történetéből (1985)
- Az Élet él és élni akar (1986)
- Kábítószer (1988)
- Kerékpársuli (1988)
- Egészséget mindenkinek (1991-1992)
- Szívdobbanás (1992)
- Rajtunk a sor? (1996)
