= Sincere cooperation =

One of the foundational principles of the EU

In European Union law, sincere cooperation (Article 4(3) TEU) is one of the foundational principles of the European Union, which determines that the Union and the Member States are required to implement any necessary measures to guarantee compliance with the duties stemming from the Treaties "in full mutual respect".

Sincere cooperation is mentioned explicitly not only in the Treaty on European Union but also in the Court of Justice of the EU's case law, applicable to different exclusive, shared, supporting competences, such as the environment, the Area of Freedom, Security, and Justice, public health, competition rules governing the internal market, and others.

The jurisprudence of the CJEU has elaborated on four main responsibilities that derive from the principle of sincere cooperation:

1) An obligation for respect and assistance between the EU and Member States in attaining the Treaties' objectives

2) Member States have an active obligation to cooperate and comply with original and derivative European law

3) Member States need to refrain from taking any measures that would impede the aims and goals of the Union

4) Member States should facilitate the institutions of the EU to accomplish the Union's objectives.

== Legal origins ==
In Article 10 of the Treaty establishing the European Community (TEC) from 2002, the provision contains the outlines of what is today known as "the principle of sincere cooperation":

"Member States shall take all appropriate measures, whether general or particular, to ensure fulfilment of the obligations arising out of this Treaty or resulting from action taken by the institutions of the Community. They shall facilitate the achievement of the Community's tasks. They shall abstain from any measure which could jeopardise the attainment of the objectives of this Treaty."

— Treaty establishing the European Community (Consolidated version 2002), Article 10

However, since the Treaty of Lisbon the provisions have been enhanced through Articles 4(3) and Article 24(3) of TEU:

3. Pursuant to the principle of sincere cooperation, the Union and the Member States shall, in full mutual respect, assist each other in carrying out tasks which flow from the Treaties.

The Member States shall take any appropriate measure, general or particular, to ensure fulfilment of the obligations arising out of the Treaties or resulting from the acts of the institutions of the Union.

The Member States shall facilitate the achievement of the Union's tasks and refrain from any measure which could jeopardise the attainment of the Union's objectives.

— Treaty on European Union, Article 4

Initially, it is notable that sincere cooperation gained a more significant prominence in the founding treaties and a more central position, that follows immediately after the Union's values. More importantly, the relationship with the principle of sincere cooperation has been widened as a two-way street, that does not only involve the Member States but also requires reciprocity from the Union's institutions. This balance can be witnessed in Article 13 TEU:

2. Each institution shall act within the limits of the powers conferred on it in the Treaties, and in conformity with the procedures, conditions and objectives set out in them. The institutions shall practice mutual sincere cooperation.

— Treaty on European Union, Article 13

This balance with sincere cooperation between inter-parties relationship, regarding the Member States and the Union, has been extended to intra-institutional relationships, within the EU. The constitutional origin of this intra-institutional commitment to sincere cooperation could be traced in CJEU case law, such as the case Greece v Council from 1986 and Luxembourg v Parliament from 1981, where the Court established that "the operation of the budgetary procedure..., is based essentially on inter-institutional dialogue. That dialogue is subject to the same mutual duties of sincere cooperation which, as the Court has held, govern relations between the Member States and the Community institutions...".

Aside from the extension of sincere cooperation on an intra-institutional level, it is crucial to underscore that there is a mixed relationship between sincere cooperation (Article 4(3) TEU), and the requirement of unity and close cooperation. The latter are duties applicable to the Union's Common Foreign and Security Policy. For instance, Article 24 TEU, underlines:

2. Within the framework of the principles and objectives of its external action, the Union shall conduct, define and implement a common foreign and security policy, based on the development of mutual political solidarity among Member States, the identification of questions of general interest and the achievement of an ever-increasing degree of convergence of Member States' actions.

3. The Member States shall support the Union's external and security policy actively and unreservedly in a spirit of loyalty and mutual solidarity and shall comply with the Union's action in this area.

The Member States shall work together to enhance and develop their mutual political solidarity. They shall refrain from any action which is contrary to the interests of the Union or likely to impair its effectiveness as a cohesive force in international relations.

The Council and the High Representative shall ensure compliance with these principles.

— Treaty on European Union, Article 24

This specific CFSP obligation is to a certain extent related to the principle of sincere cooperation but has its own space in the Treaty as these two principles could be perceived as distinct: the principle of close cooperation under CFSP is applicable "once a decision for mixed external action has been made", as opposed to the principle of sincere cooperation that in other competences applies before, while the decision has been made, and after it comes into force. As a result, and due to the sensitivity of EU external action regarding close cooperation between the Members, the scope of Article 24 leaves little room for exemptions through its direct language ("shall work", "shall refrain", "actively and unreservedly"). The need for a close cooperation among members in this special competence is even more accentuated since the Court of Justice, with the exception of Article 40 TEU and Article 275 TFEU, does not have jurisdiction over CFSP.

== Constitutional identities and sincere cooperation ==
A legal limit to sincere cooperation has been imposed within the same Article 4:

2. The Union shall respect the equality of Member States before the Treaties as well as their national identities, inherent in their fundamental structures, political and constitutional, inclusive of regional and local self-government. It shall respect their essential State functions, including ensuring the territorial integrity of the State, maintaining law and order and safeguarding national security. In particular, national security remains the sole responsibility of each Member State.

— Treaty on European Union, Article 4

Right before the principle of sincere cooperation is introduced, the legislator notes the importance of national identities. Therefore, by looking at Article 4(2) and 4(3) TEU simultaneously, there are "constitutional limits in an institutional and procedural framework" that are inherent to the framework around which the principle of sincere cooperation operates. Simultaneously, this does not infer that national identity enjoys supreme power within the Union's system, yet it is balanced against the "uniform application of EU law" through a composite constitutional structure of the CJEU and the national courts and institutions. Precisely for this to function in practice, the principle of sincere cooperation is invoked again as it its importance is crucial for the coordination of this multi-dimensional jurisprudence.

=== Limits regarding Common Foreign and Security Policy ===
Consequently, this once again, emphasizes the interconnection between national identities, sincere cooperation, and the Union's foreign policy. To this end, the Member States concerned for their rights to sovereignty within this multi-dimensional jurisprudence that requires sincere cooperation on an international level, have emphasized the non-exclusionary rights through Declarations 13 and 14 of the Lisbon Treaty: the mutual political solidarity and sincere cooperation on the CFSP EU level, "do not affect the responsibilities of the Member States... for the formulation and conduct of their [national] foreign policy...".

== Case law ==
=== ECHR and sincere cooperation ===
The EU legal order and the ECHR legal system are two separate ones, and while the EU is not a member of the Council of Europe, the Member States of the Union are; consequently, the principle of sincere cooperation has appeared in cases before the European Court of Human Rights.

==== Hungary ====
The case Könyv-Tár Kft and Others v. Hungary (Application No. 21623/13) concerned three applicant companies, all schoolbook distributors, which claimed that the creation of a state monopoly on school books is a breach of Article 1 of the Protocol No.1, namely the peaceful enjoyment of possessions. In the ECtHR deliberations, the Court has made the following arguments regarding the principle of sincere cooperation as part of the European Union legislation:

38. The Court further notes that, in accordance with Article 267 of the TFEU and the well-established case-law of the CJEU, a preliminary rulinggiven by the CJEU is binding on the referring national court as to the interpretation of the provision of EU law in question. It clarifies and defines the meaning and scope of that provision as it must be, or ought to have been, understood and applied at the time it came into force. Furthermore, pursuant to the principle of “sincere cooperation”, the authorities of EU member States have the task of ensuring, within the sphere of their competence, that the rules of EU law, as interpreted by the CJEU, are observed and that individuals’ rights under EU law are judicially protected. Consequently, the Court considers that guidance provided by a preliminary ruling must be observed not only in the specific dispute which has given rise to the referral but also, indirectly, in other cases, even those concerning legal relationships which had arisen before the CJEU gave the ruling in question.

— ECtHR, para 38

Here, the ECtHR notes the importance of sincere cooperation on a judicial level between the Court of Justice of the European Union and the national courts, while also stipulating that the Union's authorities have a responsibility to observe the practice of sincere cooperation within their conferred competence.

=== Court of Justice of the European Union ===
While the respect for national identities has been enshrined in Article 4 TEU, it is notable that post-Lisbon, for any competences that are not conferred on the Union where the Member States could exercise their sovereignty, they are still restricted in that they need to facilitate the Union's objectives and goals within their sovereignty—according to the principle of sincere cooperation. Consequently, Member States' interactions with the Union is continuously guided by the aforementioned principle. This has been reflected in CJEU case law in different areas of competence across the EU.

==== United Kingdom ====
In Case C-516/22 Commission v United Kingdom of Great Britain and Northern Ireland decided on 14 March 2024, the Court assessed the judgment of the Supreme Court of the United Kingdom in the case Micula v Romania. The Supreme Court of the United Kingdom in the aforementioned case ordered Romania to pay a compensation to Swedish investors, despite the Commission prohibiting Romania to do so, as it was incompatible with EU law. As a result of the decision of the Supreme Court of the United Kingdom, the CJEU declared that "the United Kingdom has failed to fulfil its obligations under EU law":

"...Consequently, where the outcome of the dispute before the national court depends on the validity of the Commission decision, it follows from the obligation of sincere cooperation that the national court should, in order to avoid reaching a decision that runs counter to the Commission decision, stay its proceedings pending final judgment in the action for annulment before the Courts of the European Union, unless it takes the view that, in the circumstances of the case, a reference to the Court of Justice for a preliminary ruling on the validity of the Commission decision is warranted."

— CJEU, para 98

Therefore, the Court establishes a direct link through the principle of sincere cooperation between the national courts, and the institutions of the European Union:

"...In particular, the application of the rules of EU law on State aid laid down in Articles 107 and 108 TFEU is based on an obligation of sincere cooperation between, on the one hand, the national courts, and, on the other hand, the Commission and the Courts of the European Union, in the context of which each acts on the basis of the role assigned to it by the Treaty."

— CJEU, para 95

==== Latvia ====
In the case (C-454/22), Commission v Latvia, the European Commission brought the Republic of Latvia before the Court for failing to adopt all the legal provisions by transposing "necessary to comply with Article 124(1) of Directive (EU) 2018/1972 of the European Parliament and of the Council of 11 December 2018 establishing the European Electronic Communications Code". Consequently, the Court has elaborated on the role of Member States in the process of transposition of a Directive, according to the principle of sincere cooperation:

"In that context, the Court has already held that the expression ‘obligation to notify measures transposing a directive’ in Article 260(3) TFEU refers to the obligation of the Member States to provide sufficiently clear and precise information on the measures transposing a directive. In order to satisfy the obligation of legal certainty and to ensure the transposition of the provisions of that directive in full throughout their territory, the Member States are required, in accordance with the principle of sincere cooperation laid down in Article 4(3) TEU, to state, for each provision of the directive, the national provision or provisions by means of which they consider that they have fulfilled the various obligations imposed on them by that directive. Once notified, where relevant in addition to a correlation table, it is for the Commission to establish, for the purposes of seeking the financial penalty to be imposed on the Member State in question laid down in Article 260(3) TFEU, whether certain transposing measures are clearly lacking or do not cover all of the territory of the Member State in question, bearing in mind that it is not for the Court, in judicial proceedings brought under that provision, to examine whether the national measures notified to the Commission ensure a correct transposition of the provisions of the directive in question."

— CJEU, para 74

==== Slovenia ====
In the case (C‑316/19), Commission (supported by the European Central Bank) v Slovenia, the Commission brought the Republic of Slovenia before the Court because it alleged that it breached the Union's law and failed to cooperate sincerely "by unilaterally seizing at the premises of the Banka Slovenije (Central Bank of Slovenia) documents connected to the performance of the tasks of the European System of Central Banks (ESCB) and of the Eurosystem". The Court, in its findings, focuses on the reciprocity of the relationship between the Union's institutions and the Member States:

"According to settled case-law of the Court, under the principle of sincere cooperation provided for in Article 4(3) TEU, the Member States are required to eliminate the unlawful consequences of a breach of EU law and such an obligation is owed, within the sphere of its competence, by every organ of the Member State concerned."

— CJEU, para 124

"Admittedly, the obligation of sincere cooperation is, by its very nature, reciprocal (judgment of 16 October 2003, Ireland v Commission, C‑339/00, EU:C:2003:545, paragraph 72). It was consequently for the ECB to assist the Slovenian authorities so that the latter could remedy, as far as possible, the unlawful consequences of its seizure of documents at the premises of the Central Bank of Slovenia on 6 July 2016."

— CJEU, para 125

Therefore, the Court establishes that even in a situation where there is a breach of Union's law on the side of the Member State, thus failing to adhere to the principle of sincere cooperation—reciprocity remains a core component of this principle, and a way to continue to uphold it is by providing assistance from the Union's institutions.
