= Henri Knuutinen =

Finnish ice hockey winger

- Born: 27 December 1997 (age 28) Kiuruvesi, Finland
- Height: 6 ft 3 in (191 cm)
- Weight: 194 lb (88 kg; 13 st 12 lb)
- Position: Winger
- Shoots: Left
- Liiga team: KalPa
- Playing career: 2016–present

Henri Knuutinen (born 27 December 1997) is a Finnish professional ice hockey winger currently playing for KalPa in Liiga.

Knuutinen made his Liiga debut for KalPa on 12 November 2016 against HIFK and went on to play 26 games for the team that season, scoring one goal and one assist.
