= Indian Institute of Remote Sensing =

Training and research centre of ISRO India

Coordinates: 30°20′26.8″N 78°2′38.51″E

- Type: Government
- Established: 1966; 60 years ago
- Affiliations: Indian Space Research Organisation
- Chairman: V. Narayanan
- Director: R. P. Singh
- Location: 4-Kalidas Road, Post Box No. 135, Dehradun – 248 001, Uttarakhand (India)
- Website: www.iirs.gov.in

The Indian Institute of Remote Sensing (IIRS) was established in the year 1966 under the Indian Department of Space at Dehradun, Uttarakhand. The institute was set up for research, higher education and training in the fields of remote sensing, eco-informatics and GPS technology for natural resources, environmental and disaster management.

Formerly known as the Indian Photo-interpretation Institute (IPI), the institute was founded on 21 April 1966, under Survey of India (SOI). It was established with the collaboration of the Government of the Netherlands on the pattern of the Faculty of Geo-Information Science and Earth Observation (ITC) of the University of Twente, formerly known as the International Institute for Aerospace Survey and Earth Sciences. The institute was conceptualized by India's first prime minister, Shri Jawaharlal Nehru, during his visit to the Netherlands in 1957.

== Courses ==
The IIRS focuses on education and training in the field of geoinformatics, to include technology and applications of remote sensing, GIS, and GPS.

Some are affiliated with Andhra University, located in Visakhapatnam.

=== Collaborations ===
The IIRS has collaborated with ITC, IHE (International Institute for Infrastructural, Hydraulic and Environmental Engineering), Wageningen University in the Netherlands, ITTO (International Timber Research Organization), UNESCO, WMO (World Meteorological Organization), ADPC (Asian Disaster Preparedness Centre), and NGI (Norwegian Geological Institute).
