= Xavier Prats Monné =

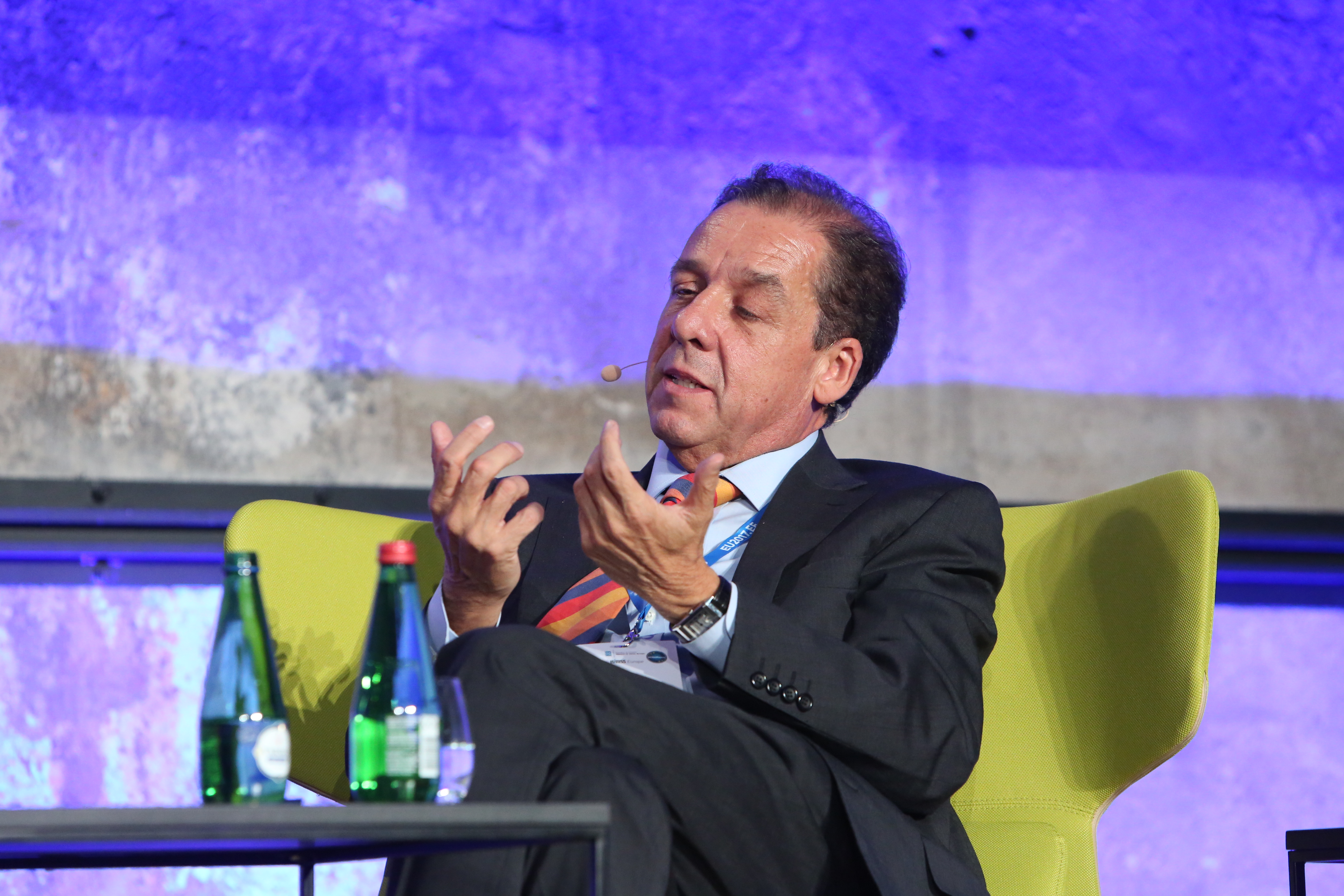
- Born: 1956 (age 69–70); Tarragona, Spain
- Education: Complutense University of Madrid, College of Europe
- Occupations: Former Director-General of DG Health and Food Safety, Former Director-General of DG Education and Culture

Xavier Prats Monné (born 1956 in Tarragona, Spain) is a Spanish former high-ranking official of the European Commission, who served as Director-General of the Directorate-General for Health and Food Safety (2015–2018) and Director-General at the Directorate-General for Education and Culture (2014–2015).

== Background ==
Born in Tarragona, Spain, he completed his primary and secondary education at the Istituto Massimo of Rome, Italy. He majored in social anthropology at the Complutense University of Madrid, and holds degrees in development economics from the International Center for Advanced Mediterranean Agronomic Studies in France; and in European Affairs from the College of Europe in Belgium, where he graduated first of the Class of 1981–82 (the Johan Willem Beyen Promotion) and served as assistant professor. He is fluent in Spanish, English, French, Italian, and Catalan.

== European Commission career ==
He served as a high-ranking official of the European Commission, including as: Director General of the Directorate-General for Health and Food Safety (2015-2018), Deputy Director General (2010–2014) and Director General (2014–2015) at the Directorate-General for Education and Culture.

As Director-general for Health and Food Safety he was responsible for the promotion of public health, the assessment of national healthcare systems' performance, animal health and welfare, and the strengthening of Europe's capacity to deal with crisis situations in human health and food safety.

As Director-general for Education and Culture, the main policy areas under his responsibility were: the modernisation of European education and training systems; educational mobility, including the Erasmus+ programme for students; and international relations in the field of education, culture and youth. He represents the European Commission (EC) at the European Institute for Innovation and Technology (EIT).

From mid-2007 till the end-2010, he served as the EC Director for employment policy, Europe 2020 Strategy and international relations in the field of employment. In this capacity, he was also responsible for relations between the EC and the International Labour Organization (ILO), and EC "sherpa" representative at the G20 Labour Ministers meeting.

From 2007 to end-2010 he served as one of the five founding members of the EC Impact Assessment Board, which vets all impact assessments produced by the institution. He previously served as: Director for the European Social Fund; Deputy Chief of Staff of the EC Vice-President for external relations; Advisor of the EC Commissioner for Regional policy; assistant to the European Commission Spokesperson; Administrator at the Directorate General for Development policy and at the General Secretariat of the European Commission.

In 2014, he received the Order of Alfonso X El Sabio, granted by Spain in recognition of achievements in the fields of science, culture, higher education and research.

== Later work ==
Xavier Prats Monné left the European Commission in October 2018 to serve in a number of non-profit institutions in the field of education and health. Current activities [Jan 2025]:

Special advisor at Teach For All, a global non-profit organisation focusing on expanding education opportunities around the world; chair of Teach For All's Europe Board.

President of the Board of Governors of the Hospital de la Santa Creu i Sant Pau in Barcelona (Spain's oldest hospital), and of the Sant Pau Research Institute.

President of the Advisory Board of the Open University of Catalonia (UOC).

Member of the Board of Trustees of the Fundación Banco Sabadell. Advisor to the Institut Jacques Delors in Paris, and other non-profit organisations.
