= GROWL =

International education network for degrowth

GROWL is an international education network for degrowth formed by academics, practitioners, researchers and political activists. One central aim of the network is to promote collective action across initiatives related to degrowth (e.g. Transition Towns, agroecology, Solidarity economy, DIY among other "nowtopias"), in order to reduce the atomization and dispersal of initiatives that hinder their capacity to scale up and present a solid alternative to the dominant economic paradigm.

== History ==
GROWL was founded in 2013 by ten non-profit, research and higher education organisations under the coordination of the think-tank Research & Degrowth. The network build-up has been supported with a ca. €200000 grant from the Grundtvig programme for the period between August 2013 and July 2015.

In 2014, the first international thematic courses took place:

- Social dimension of agroecology
- Solidarity & Cooperative Economy
- Mental Infrastructures
- Local Economic Alternatives

== Philosophy ==
The network departs from the acknowledgment of major shortcomings of contemporary education institutions in providing adequate knowledge and skills required to critically address the problems of limits to growth and engage in the transformations towards a post growth and sustainable society.

The network relies on the theoretical foundations of social constructivism and the concept of peer learning based on communities of practice.
