= Grammar Explorer =

Language learning resource

Grammar Explorer is a language learning resource that was co-founded by the European Commission as part of its Lingua programme within the SOCRATES programme. The grammar is based on the requirements of the Common European Framework of Reference for Languages.

== Background ==
The primary objective of the Lingua 2 programme is "to help raise the standards in language teaching and learning by ensuring the availability of sufficient high quality language learning instruments and tools for assessing linguistic skills acquired. Lingua 2 will encourage both the development of new tools and a wider dissemination of existing tools that represent best practice and provide European added value."

The specific objectives of the Lingua 2 programme are:

- to encourage innovation in the development of language learning and teaching tools for all sectors of education;
- to encourage the sharing of best practices;
- to provide a wider variety of language teaching materials to more clearly defined groups, by encouraging the production of language tools which are commercially under-represented or difficult to market on a large scale, notably because of the target group or the nature of the educational approach involved;
- to encourage the acquisition of sufficient knowledge of foreign languages to meet the requirements of particular situations and contexts, provided that these measures are not linked to a specific profession (which would fall more within the scope of the Leonardo da Vinci programme);
- to improve the distribution and availability of products.

The programme ceased in 2006 and has been replaced by the Lifelong Learning Programme 2007-2013, which pursues similar goals.

=== The Common European Framework of Reference for Languages ===
Complementary to this programme and to support the objectives, the Council of Europe has produced a Europe-wide curriculum entitled The Common European Framework of Reference for Languages. This document provides a detailed model for describing and scaling language use and the different kinds of knowledge and skills required.

== Evolution of the online grammar ==
=== Print-based grammar and the Internet ===
There are countless Internet sites that call themselves "grammars" of a certain language. Many of these online grammars are text-based reproductions of traditional descriptive print grammars which expect the student to sit in front of a computer screen and read as they would read a grammar book. These grammars view grammar as an independent system of rules that is not directly linked to or relevant to language usage, nor to the language user and learner. Further evidence of this view and approach is found in the fact that these grammars do not include practice material that asks learners/users to test their understanding and command of language usage.

None of these online grammars are structured to take advantage of the many benefits of multimedia and of the internet while successfully avoiding the inherent pitfalls of that medium. Furthermore, none of them are structured with the Basic User (as defined in the Common European Framework of Reference) in mind.

Additionally, existing online materials do not make full use of the ideas laid down in the Common European Framework of Reference for Languages. They do not support a syllabus such as Waystage, pitch themselves at a clearly defined level (A2) or help students to prepare for a recognized European Language Certificate.

Grammar Explorer was created to address the missing pedagogical link between grammar as rule system and the needs of the language learner. This is achieved by putting into practice a functional and constructivist pedagogical concept that focuses on the aspect of usage in the language system and the individual learner's need to acquire practical competence which does not require the ability to account for one's grammatical knowledge.

=== Pedagogical approach ===
The pedagogical concept underlying Grammar Explorer is firmly rooted in Constructivism (learning theory), cognitive psychology and recent findings of the neurosciences with regard to learning. It, therefore, fulfils the criteria laid down in The Common European Framework of Reference: The materials are multi-purpose, flexible, easily accessible, dynamic and non-dogmatic.

Grammar Explorer surpasses the descriptive, form-focused grammars currently available, because it treats learners as active meaning-makers and puts them firmly in control of their learning experience. Within the structure of the grammar, learners are able to enter into a non-linear process of negotiation with grammatical material that requires and encourages the use of basic cognitive and meta-cognitive strategies such as inferencing, grouping and recombination. It is through this process of exploration and negotiation that the learners acquire the type of functional grammatical competence that is essential for the successful acquisition of pragmatic competence and for the development of cognitive and metacognitive skills.

Information technologies and the hypertext principle underlying the World Wide Web/relational databases are ideally suited to support a constructivist approach to grammar acquisition.

=== Innovation in online language learning ===
Grammar Explorer aims to seriously use a constructivist approach for developing web-based language learning material. It will, therefore, fill the gap created, on the one hand, by the influence of the neurosciences on language teaching methodology, and on the other hand, through the persistent adherence of all previously and currently published grammars to outdated concepts. There is no model for such a grammar.

== The structure of the grammar ==
Grammar Explorer is arranged in a modular way. The modules are arranged in alphabetical order rather than according to the structure of the grammar. In this respect Grammar Explorer is more like a dictionary. This is a clear indication that Grammar Explorer has adopted what the neurosciences have argued for some time, that our memory tends to store semantically, especially at the level of the Basic User.

Furthermore, the neurosciences clearly support Michael Lewis's didactic approach to language acquisition/learning that has been in circulation for about two decades now: Language must be seen as 'grammaticalized lexis'. A learner must have sufficient semantic data at hand in order to be able to construct meaning. Initially, this is exclusively semantic meaning, which is then transferred into higher level thinking once sufficient semantic data is available to enable the learner to infer the underlying structures. Learners move progressively from semantic meaning to more abstract syntactic and morphological meaning.
