= Juho Rytkönen =

Finnish lumberjack and politician (1917–1973)

Juho Fredrik Rytkönen (2 February 1917 – 31 December 1973) was a Finnish lumberjack and politician, born in Kiuruvesi. He was a member of the Parliament of Finland from 1951 to 1958, representing the Finnish People's Democratic League (SKDL). Rytkönen was a member of the Communist Party of Finland (SKP). He was a presidential elector in the 1956 Finnish presidential election.
