= Integrated programme =

Integrated programme may refer to:

- Integrated Programme - an education programme in Singapore
- EU Integrated programme - European Union Integrated action programme in the field of Lifelong learning
- Integrated Programme in Management (IPM) - IIM Indore, India
