= Education and Training 2010 =

"Education and Training 2010" was the name given by the European Commission to the activities it supports which pursue the agenda set out in the 2001 report of European Ministers of Education to the Spring 2001 European Council, and in their 2002 joint work programme with the Commission. It functions under the Open Method of Coordination and involves exchanges of experience and good practice, joint policy development, benchmarking and measurement of progress.

== Background ==
In the Communique following the Lisbon Spring Summit in March 2000, the Heads of State and Government of the European Union ear-marked a number of areas where they felt that improvements in education and training were needed, and asked the Ministers of Education to reflect together about the future of education systems and how they serve citizens. "The European Council asks the Council (Education) to undertake a general reflection on the concrete future objectives of education systems, focusing on common concerns and priorities while respecting national diversity, with a view to ... presenting a broader report to the European Council in the Spring of 2001." (paragraph 27).

The Education Council in June 2000 asked the European Commission to prepare a draft of this report, following the Community method, and in January 2001 the draft was presented to the Council and the European Parliament. In this draft the Commission extended the concept of "education" in the original European Council conclusions to "education and training"; and this extension has remained in force ever since. The Commission's draft was accepted with few amendments and the Education Ministers adopted it for transmission to the European Council on 14 February 2001. The European Council met in Stockholm on 23 and 24 March 2001, and in the light of the council's document, asked the Council and Commission to report back to the Spring European Council 2002, a year later, giving "a detailed work programme on the follow-up of the objectives of education and training systems, including an assessment of their achievement in the framework of the open method of coordination and in a worldwide perspective; special attention must be given to ways and means of encouraging young people, especially women, in scientific and technical studies as well as ensuring the long-term recruitment of qualified teachers in these fields". The Commission presented a draft work programme in September 2001. This was considerably worked over and a revised version was adopted jointly by the Council and Commission on 14 February 2002. The European Council welcomed the Work Programme, asked the Ministers and the commission to implement it, and to report back two years later. The Open Method of Coordination had found its place in Education and Training.

=== Content of the original Work Programme ===
The original work programme adopted jointly by the council and the commission was a consensual document. It underlined the importance for the European Union of improving education and training systems, and set three strategic objectives:

- improving the quality and effectiveness of education and the measurement of progress through agreed instruments,

training systems in the European Union

- facilitating the access of all to education and training systems
- opening-up education and training systems to the wider world.

The Work Programme recognised the importance of Education and Training for competitiveness and as a part of Europe's response to the challenges of globalisation; and in that context set what it described as "ambitious but realistic goals":

1. The Highest quality will be achieved in education and training and Europe will be recognised as a world-wide reference for the quality and relevance of its education and training systems and institutions
2. Education and training systems in Europe will be compatible enough to allow citizens to move between them and take advantage of their diversity
3. Holders of qualifications, knowledge and skills acquired anywhere in the EU will be able to get them effectively validated throughout the Union for the purpose of career and further learning
4. Europeans, at all ages, will have access to lifelong learning
5. Europe will be open to cooperation for mutual benefits with all other regions and should be the most-favoured destination of students, scholars and researchers from other world regions.

The Work Programme underlines the way in which the Open Method of Coordination should work in Education and Training. This was to draw on tools "such as indicators and benchmarks as well as on comparing best practice, periodic monitoring, evaluation and peer review, organised as mutual learning processes".

== "Education and Training 2010" ==
The actual name "Education and Training 2010" does not appear until the first Joint Report between the Commission and the Council in Spring 2004. In the commission's draft report, presented on 11 November 2003 the Work Programme jointly adopted earlier is referred to as "Education and Training 2010" – a deliberate attempt by the commission to provide an overall identity and coherence to a multifarious process involving numerous departments and services within each Member State. The joint report adopted by the Commission and the Council on 26 February 2004 "Education & Training 2010" – The success of the Lisbon Strategy hinges on urgent reforms" keeps the name originally proposed by the commission, but comparison between the two documents shows that while the content is parallel, the tone was lowered and made less urgent – and therefore easier for the European Union's Member States to accept. The report:

- argues for the importance of education and training in the Lisbon Strategy;
- underlines the lack of progress over the previous years
- calls for:
  - reform and investment (including private investment) to be focused on key areas for the knowledge society;
  - access to lifelong learning to be a reality for all; and
  - for a European framework "to stand as a common reference for the recognition of qualifications and competences".

The 2006 joint report was almost exactly the commission's draft, with an additional set of "key messages" to the European Council. Like its predecessor, it underlined the importance of education and training within the Lisbon Strategy and for competitiveness reasons and stressed the need for better progress.

== The Substance of the programme ==
=== Policy development and exchange ===
The commission's original strategy to encourage exchanges of policies and practices between the Education Ministries of the European Union was based on the development of thematic working groups in the various areas covered by the strategy. Member States were to take part on those areas which interested them. In practice, only a certain number of these groups functioned well – notably those in the areas of teacher training, ICTs and Education/training, key competences for school leavers, and measuring progress through indicators and benchmarks. The latter group has overseen the production of reports by the Commission each year measuring progress and analysing movements in educational indicators against a set of benchmarks (see below).

Reports from these groups are available on the Commission's web site at .

=== Benchmarking ===
The concept of benchmarking is viewed with considerable suspicion by a number of European countries, though all accept the principle that education and training policies should be based on evidence. When the Commission therefore put forward its proposal for benchmarking, it therefore clarified that its proposals were not benchmarks in the normal sense but "targets" which the European Union as a whole should seek to achieve. After difficult discussions between countries, this concept was adopted by the Education Council in its conclusions of May 2003.
