= Culture 2000 =

Incentive program of the EU

Culture 2000 was a seven-year European Union (EU) programme, which had among its key objectives to preserve and enhance Europe's cultural heritage. Its duration was from 2000 to 2006, and it had a budget of €236.5 million.

Culture 2000 provided grants to cultural cooperation projects in all artistic and cultural fields (performing arts, plastic and visual arts, literature, heritage, cultural history, etc.).

The objective of Culture 2000 was to promote a common cultural area characterised by its cultural diversity and shared cultural heritage. Its stated aims were to encourage creativity and mobility of artists, public access to culture, the dissemination of art and culture, inter-cultural dialogue and knowledge of the history and cultural heritage of the peoples of Europe.

The program contributed to the financing of European Community co-operations in all artistic fields: performing arts, visual arts, literature, music, history and cultural heritage, etc. Equipped with €240 million over the period 2000–2006, this program aimed to develop the cultural diversity of the European Union, the creativity and the exchange between European cultural actors, whilst making culture more accessible to a larger public. Financial support was granted to projects which were selected on the basis of an annual Call for Proposals.

== See also ==
- Cultural policies of the European Union
- MEDIA Programme
