= Environmental issues in the European Union =

Environmental issues in the European Union include the environmental issues identified by the European Union as well as its constituent states. The European Union has several federal bodies which create policy and practice across the constituent states.

== Issues ==
=== Air pollution ===
A report from the European Environment Agency shows that road transport remains Europe's single largest air polluter.

National Emission Ceilings (NEC) for certain atmospheric pollutants are regulated by NECD Directive 2001/81/EC (NECD). As part of the preparatory work associated with the revision of the NECD, the European Commission is assisted by the NECPI working group (National Emission Ceilings – Policy Instruments).

Directive 2008/50/EC of the European Parliament and of the Council of 21 May 2008 on ambient air quality and cleaner air for Europe (the new Air Quality Directive) has entered into force on 11 June 2008.

Individual citizens can force their local councils to tackle air pollution, following an important ruling in July 2009 from the European Court of Justice (ECJ). The EU's court was asked to judge the case of a resident of Munich, Dieter Janecek, who said that under the 1996 EU Air Quality Directive (Council Directive 96/62/EC of 27 September 1996 on ambient air quality assessment and management) the Munich authorities were obliged to take action to stop pollution exceeding specified targets. Janecek then took his case to the ECJ, whose judges said European citizens are entitled to demand air quality action plans from local authorities in situations where there is a risk that EU limits will be overshot.

==== Legislation ====
Since the late 1970s, the European Union's (EU) policy has been to develop and drive appropriate measures to improve air quality throughout the EU. The control of emissions from mobile sources, improving fuel quality and promoting and integrating environmental protection requirements into the transport and energy sector are part of these aims.

The main advising agency of the EU is the European Environment Agency (EEA). It came into force in 1993, after the decision to locate the EEA in Copenhagen. Work started in earnest in 1994. The EEA's mandate is to help the community and member countries make informed decisions about improving the environment and integrating environmental considerations into economic policies and to coordinate the European environment information and observation network (Eionet). Eionet is a partnership network across member states involving approximately 1000 experts and more than 350 national institutions. The network supports the collection and organization of data and the development and dissemination of information concerning Europe's environment.

=== Climate change ===
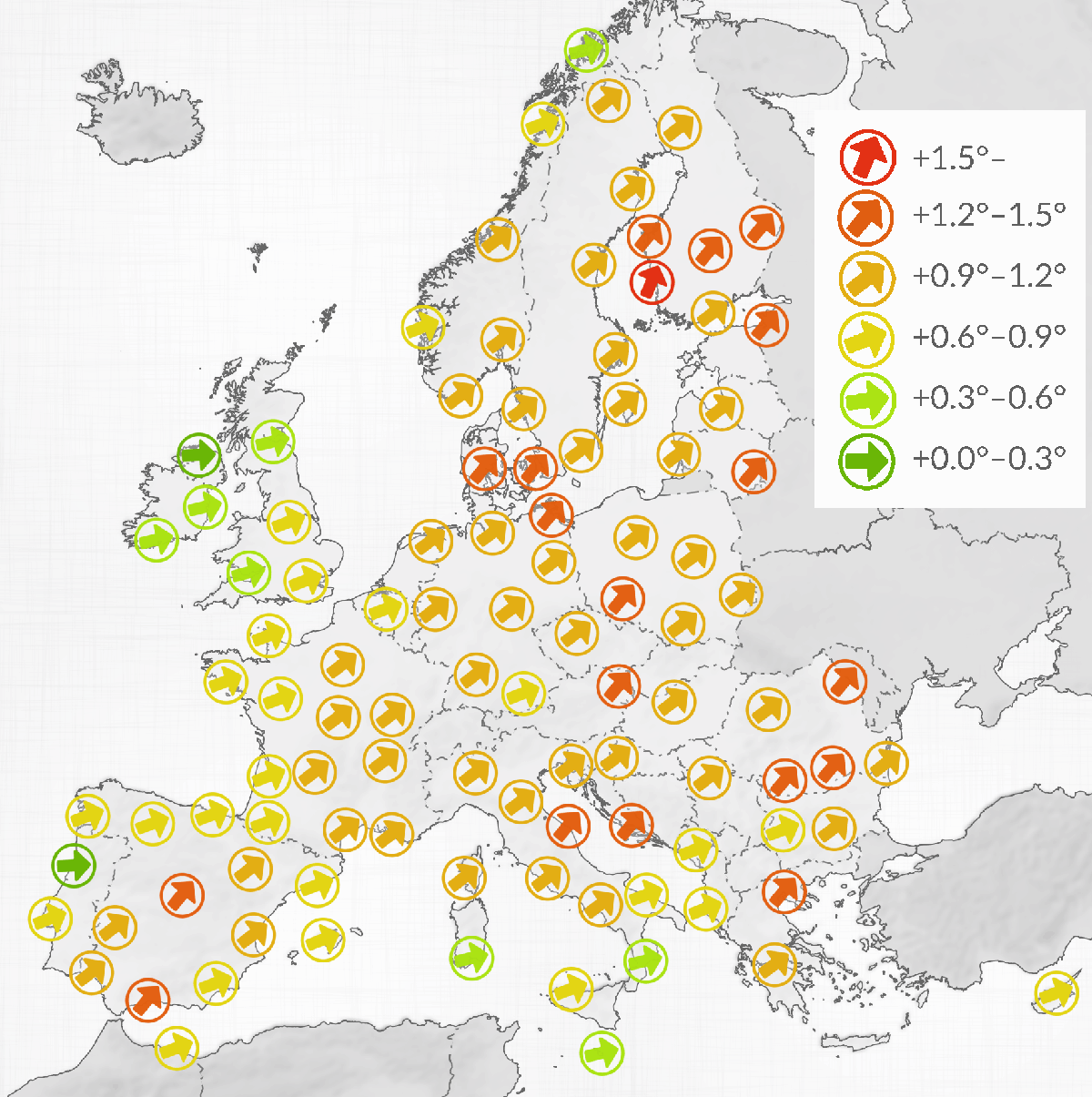
Increase of average yearly temperature (2000–2017) above the 20th century average in selected cities in Europe

Climate change has resulted in an increase in temperature of 2.3 °C (4.14 °F) (2022) in Europe compared to pre-industrial levels. Europe is the fastest warming continent in the world. Europe's climate is getting warmer due to anthropogenic activity. According to international climate experts, global temperature rise should not exceed 2 °C to prevent the most dangerous consequences of climate change; without reduction in greenhouse gas emissions, this could happen before 2050. Climate change has implications for all regions of Europe, with the extent and nature of effects varying across the continent.

Effects on European countries include warmer weather and increasing frequency and intensity of extreme weather such as heat waves, bringing health risks and effects on ecosystems. European countries are major contributors to global greenhouse gas emissions, although the European Union and governments of several countries have outlined plans to implement climate change mitigation and an energy transition in the 21st century, the European Green Deal being one of these.

Public opinion in Europe shows concern about climate change; in the European Investment Bank's Climate Survey of 2020, 90% of Europeans believe their children will experience the effects of climate change in their daily lives. Climate change activism and businesses shifting their practices has taken place in Europe.

== Protected areas ==
Protected areas of the European Union are areas which need and/or receive special protection because of their environmental, cultural or historical value to the member states of the European Union.

- NATURA 2000
- Special Area of Conservation (SAC)
- Special Protection Area (SPA)

== Policy ==
Development of CO_{2} emissions in the European Union

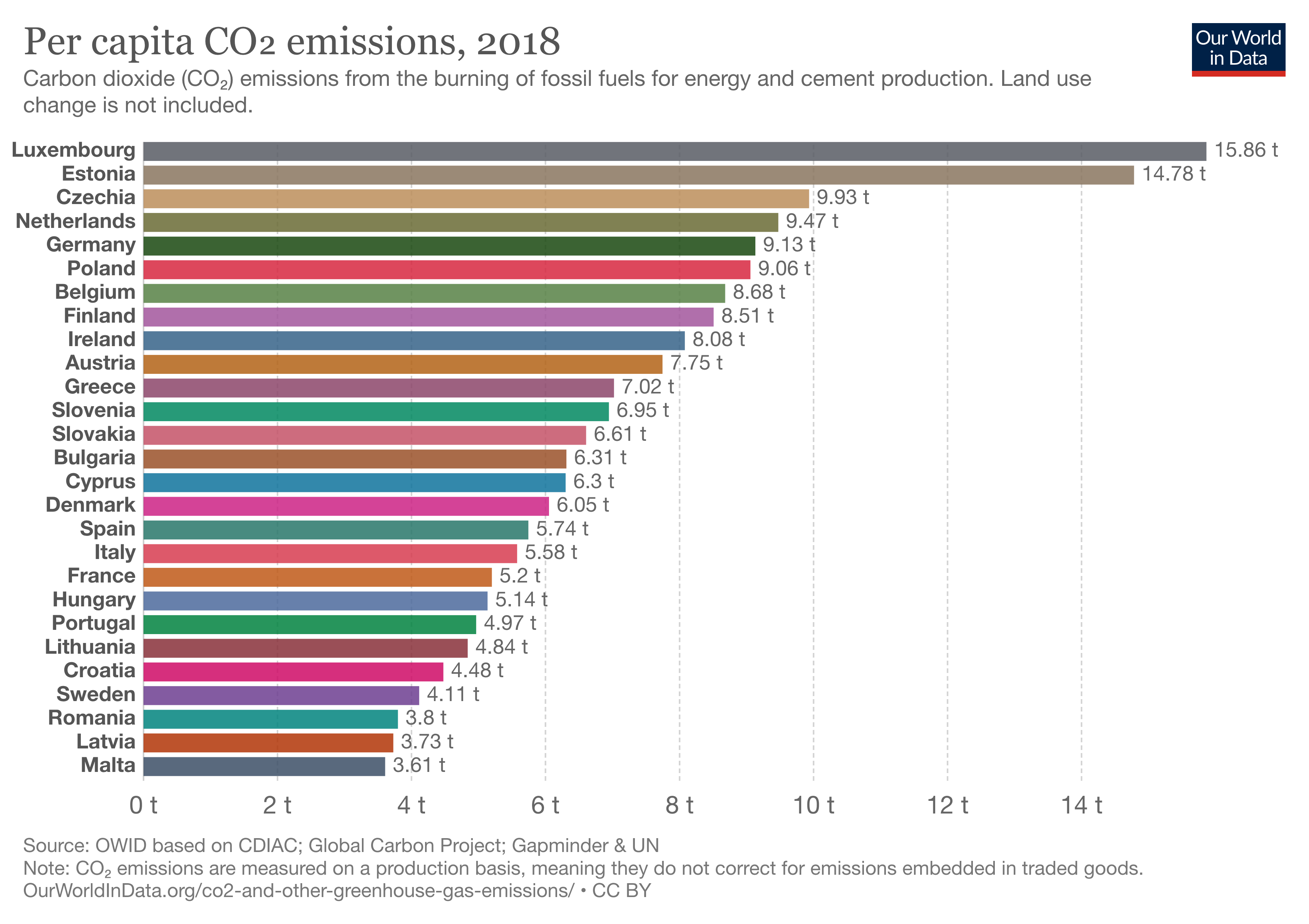
CO_{2} emissions per capita in the European Union

The European Union (EU) Environmental Policy was initiated in 1973 with the "Environmental Action Programme" at which point the Environmental Unit was formed (named Directorate General for the Environment in 1981). The policy has thereafter evolved "to cover a vast landscape of different topics enacted over many decades" (Reuters) and in 2015 the Institute for European Environmental Policy estimated that "the body of EU environmental law" amounted to more than 500 directives, regulations and decisions.

"Over the past decades the European Union has put in place a broad range of environmental legislation. As a result, air, water and soil pollution has significantly been reduced. Chemicals legislation has been modernised and the use of many toxic or hazardous substances has been restricted. Today, EU citizens enjoy some of the best water quality in the world" (European Commission, EAP 2020)

=== Renewable energy ===
Share of renewable energy in gross final energy consumption in selected European countries: 10–20% 20–30% / 30–40% 40–50% / 50–60% >60%

Renewable energy progress in the European Union (EU) is driven by the European Commission's 2023 revision of the Renewable Energy Directive, which raised the EU's binding renewable energy target for 2030 to at least 42.5%, up from the previous target of 32%. Effective since November 20, 2023, across all EU countries, this directive includes reducing greenhouse gas emissions by at least 55% by 2030 and achieving climate neutrality by 2050. The Energy 2020 strategy exceeded its goals, with the EU achieving a 22.1% share of renewable energy in 2020, surpassing the 20% target.

The largest renewable energy category for Europe in 2023 was solid, liquid, and gaseous biomass, which comprised half of all renewable energy consumption that year. In particular, wood is the leading source of renewable energy in Europe, far ahead of solar and wind. In 2023, renewables provided 26.2% of total EU energy consumption in heating and cooling, marking an 11.7% increase since 2004. In electricity, renewables accounted for 45.3% of gross energy consumption, led by wind (38.5%) and hydro-power (28.2%), followed by solar (20.5%), solid biofuels (6.2%) and other renewable sources (6.6%). In transport, the share of renewable energy used reached 10.8%. Renewable electricity generation reached 50% of total EU electricity in the first half of 2024.

In 2023, Sweden led among EU countries with 66.4% of its gross final energy consumption derived from renewable sources, followed by Finland (50.8%), Denmark (44.9%), and Latvia (43.2%). Conversely, Luxembourg reported the lowest renewable energy proportion with only 11.6%, followed by Belgium (14.7%), Malta (15.1%), and Ireland (15.3%).

The renewable energy directive enacted in 2009 lays out a framework for individual member states to share the overall EU-wide 20% renewable energy target for 2020. Promoting the use of renewable energy sources is important both to the reduction of the EU's energy dependence and in meeting targets to combat global warming. The directive sets targets for each individual member state taking into account the different starting points and potentials. Targets for renewable energy use by 2020 among different member states varied from 10% to 49%. 26 EU member states met their national 2020 targets. The sole exception was France, which had aimed for 23% but only reached 19.1%. As of 2023, Ireland had also dropped below its 2020 target.

raw data

chart page
History of the percentage-share of renewables on the gross final energy consumption in the European Union since 2004

=== European Green Deal ===
The European Green Deal, approved in 2020, is a set of policy initiatives by the European Commission with the overarching aim of making the European Union (EU) climate neutral in 2050. The plan is to review each existing law on its climate merits, and also introduce new legislation on the circular economy (CE), building renovation, biodiversity, farming and innovation.

The president of the European Commission, Ursula von der Leyen, stated that the European Green Deal would be Europe's "man on the moon moment". On 13 December 2019, the European Council decided to press ahead with the plan, with an opt-out for Poland. On 15 January 2020, the European Parliament voted to support the deal as well, with requests for higher ambition. A year later, the European Climate Law was passed, which legislated that greenhouse gas emissions should be 55% lower in 2030 compared to 1990. The Fit for 55 package is a large set of proposed legislation detailing how the European Union plans to reach this target. ETS2 is the new EU Emissions Trading System that will enter into force in 2027 and, for the first time in history, will set a price for CO2 emissions from fuels used in the building and road transport sectors.

The European Commission's climate change strategy, launched in 2020, is focused on a promise to make Europe a net-zero emitter of greenhouse gases by 2050 and to demonstrate that economies will develop without increasing resource usage. However, the Green Deal has measures to ensure that nations that are already reliant on fossil fuels are not left behind in the transition to renewable energy. The green transition is a top priority for Europe. The EU member states want to reduce greenhouse gas emissions by 55% by 2030 from 1990 levels, and become climate neutral by 2050.

Von der Leyen appointed Frans Timmermans as Executive Vice President of the European Commission for the European Green Deal in 2019. He was succeeded by Maroš Šefčovič in 2023, and Teresa Ribera in 2024.

=== Environments or ecosystems ===
The Nature Restoration Law is a regulation (Regulation (EU) 2024/1991) of the European Union to protect the EU environments and restore its nature to a good ecological state through renaturation. The law is a core element of the European Green Deal and the EU Biodiversity Strategy and makes the targets set therein for the "restoration of nature" binding. EU member states will have to develop their national restoration plans by 2026. They will have to restore at least 30% of habitats in poor condition by 2030, 60% by 2040, and 90% by 2050.

The regulation is a response to Europe's declining natural environments, with more than 80% of habitats in poor condition. Its goals include protecting the functioning of ecosystem services, climate change mitigation, resilience and autonomy by preventing natural disasters and reducing risks to food security, and restoring damaged ecosystems.

The regulation was proposed by the European Commission on 22 June 2022. The law was adopted in the Council of the European Union on 17 June 2024 and was published in the EU's Official Journal on 29 July 2024, thus coming into force on 18 August 2024 (20th day after publication).

=== Pesticides ===
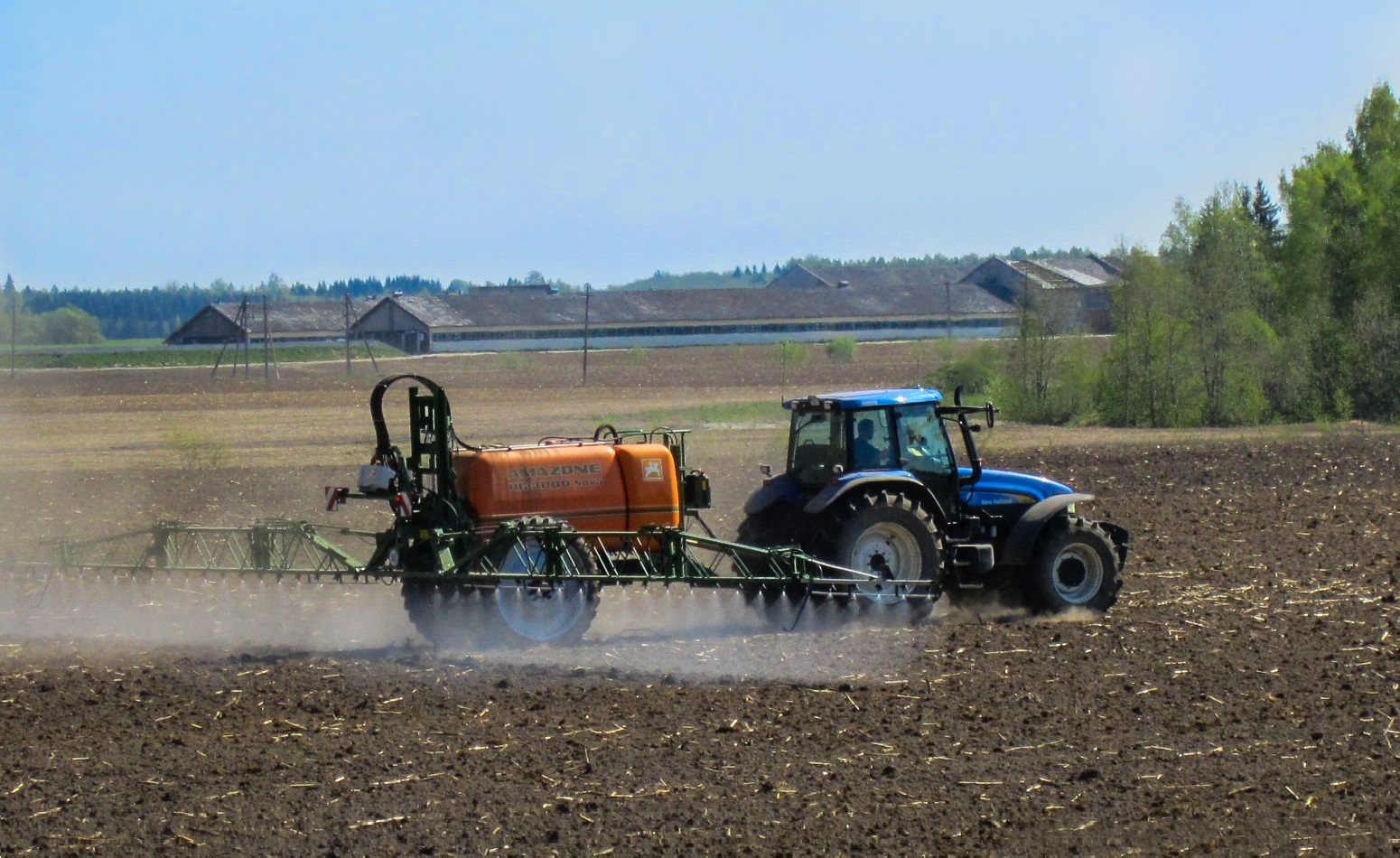
Pesticide spraying in spring

A pesticide, also called Plant Protection Product (PPP), which is a term used in regulatory documents, consists of several different components. The active ingredient in a pesticide is called “active substance” and these active substances either consist of chemicals or micro-organisms. The aims of these active substances are to specifically take action against organisms that are harmful to plants (Art. 2(2), Regulation (EC) No 1107/2009). In other words, active substances are the active components against pests and plant diseases.

In the Regulation (EC) No 1107/2009, a pesticide is defined based on how it is used. Thus, pesticides have to fulfill certain criteria in order to be called pesticides. Among others, the criteria include that they either protect plants against harmful organisms - by killing or in other ways preventing the organism from performing harm, that they enhance the natural ability of plants to defend themselves against these harmful organisms, or that they kill off competing plants such as weeds.

Within the European Union a 2-tiered approach is used for the approval and authorisation of pesticides. Firstly, before an actual pesticide can be developed and put on the European market, the active substance of the pesticide needs to be approved for the European Union. Only after approval of an active substance, a procedure of approval of the Plant Protection Product (PPP) can begin in the individual Member States. In case of approval, there is a monitoring programme to make sure the pesticide residues in food are below the limits set by the European Food Safety Authority (EFSA).

The use of PPPs (i.e. pesticides) in the European Union (EU) is regulated by the Regulation No 1107/2009 on Plant Protection Products in cooperation with other EU Regulations and Directives (e.g. the regulation on maximum residue levels in food (MRL); Regulation (EC) No 396/2005, and the Directive on sustainable use of pesticides; Directive 2009/128/EC). These regulatory documents are set to ensure safe use of pesticides in the EU regarding human health and environmental sustainability. The responsible authorities within the EU working with pesticide regulation are the European Commission, European Food Safety Authority (EFSA), European Chemical Agency (ECHA); working in cooperation with the EU Member States. Additionally, important stakeholders are the chemical producing companies, which develop PPPs and active substances that are to be evaluated by the regulatory authorities mentioned above.

Conservative Agriculture Spokesman Anthea McIntyre MEP and colleague Daniel Dalton MEP were appointed to the European Parliament's special committee on pesticides on 16 March 2018. Sitting for nine months, the committee will examine the scientific evaluation of glyphosate, the world's most commonly used weed killer which was relicensed for five years by the EU in December after months of uncertainty. They will also consider wider issues around the authorisation of pesticides.

=== Invasive species ===
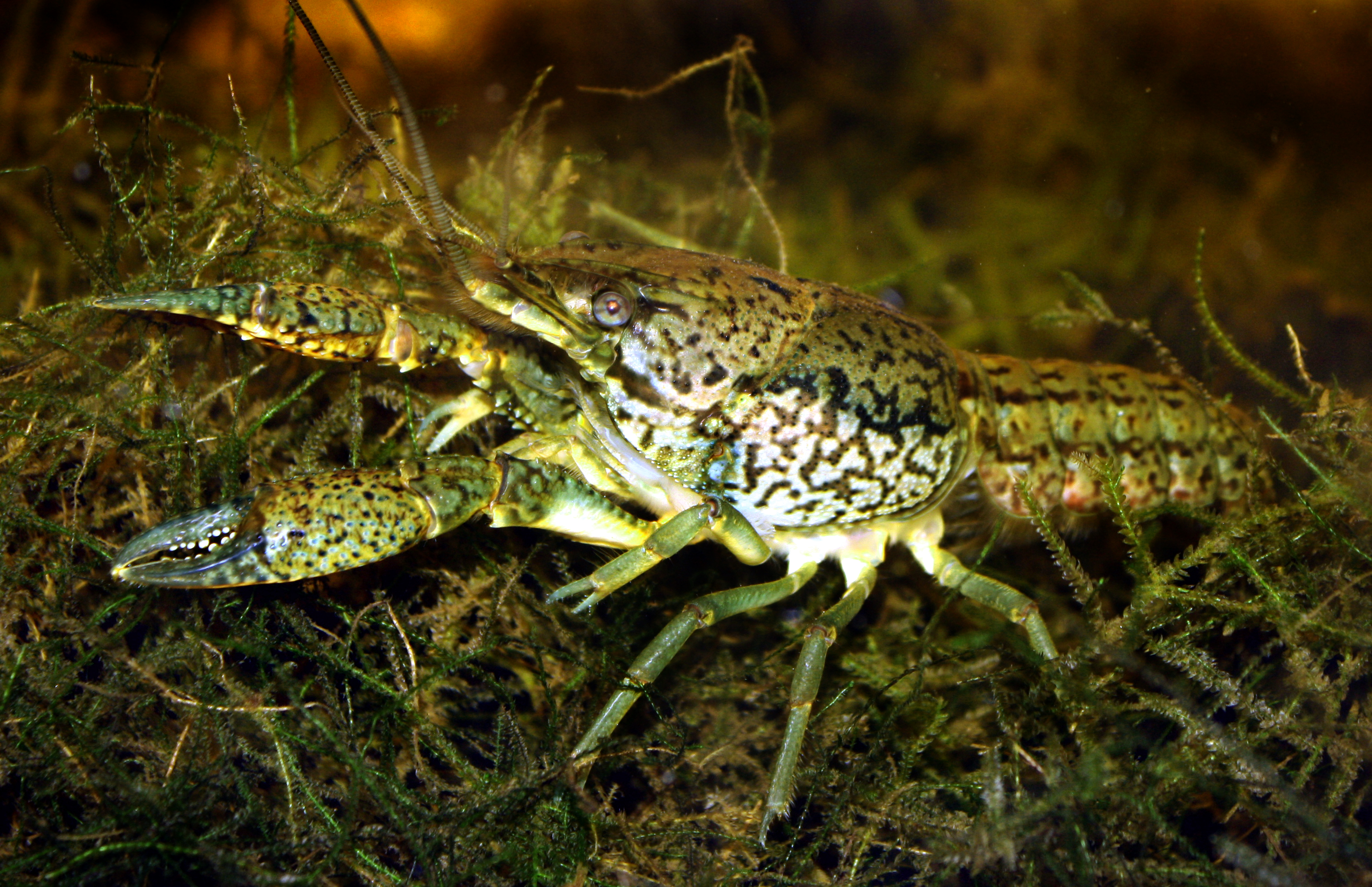
Procambarus virginalis (marbled crayfish), caught from an established population in southwestern Germany.

The list of invasive alien species of Union concern is a regulatory list of invasive animals and plants whose introduction and spread within the European Union are strictly prohibited due to their significant negative impact on the natural environment, economy, or human health. First published in 2016, it has been updated multiple times and it currently consists of 114 species, of which 65 are animals and 49 are plants. (Note: As of March 2026.)

== Government organizations ==
=== EEA ===
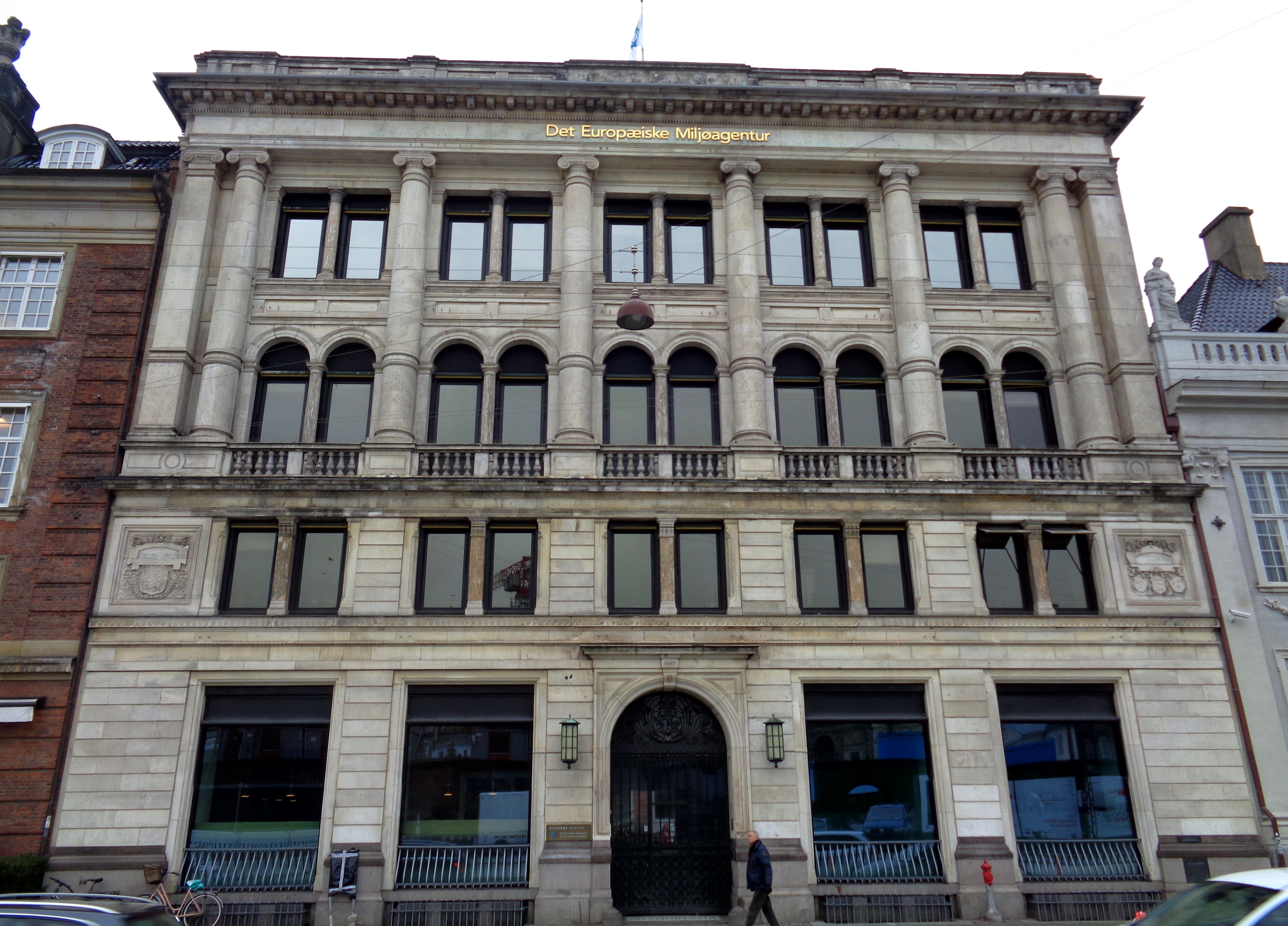
European Environment Agency Building in Copenhagen in winter

The European Environment Agency (EEA) is the agency of the European Union (EU) which provides independent information on the environment in climate policy, biodiversity conservation and other environmental goals set by the country.

=== Climate Programme ===
The European Climate Change Programme (ECCP) was launched in June 2000 by the European Union's European Commission, with the purpose of avoiding dangerous climate change.

The goal of the ECCP is to identify, develop and implement all the necessary elements of an EU strategy to implement the Kyoto Protocol. All EU countries' ratifications of the Kyoto Protocol were deposited simultaneously on 31 May 2002. The ECCP involved all the relevant stakeholders working together, including representatives from Commission's different departments, the member states, industry and environmental groups.

The European Union Emissions Trading System for greenhouse gases (EU ETS) is perhaps the most significant contribution of the ECCP, and the EU ETS is the largest greenhouse gas emissions trading scheme in the world.

In 1996 the EU adopted a target of a maximum 2 °C rise in global mean temperature, compared to pre-industrial levels. Since then, European Leaders have reaffirmed this goal several times. Due to only minor efforts in global Climate change mitigation it is highly likely that the world will not be able to reach this particular target. The EU might then be forced to accept a less ambitious target or to change its climate policy paradigm.

=== Directorate General ===
Directorate-General for Environment (DG ENV) is a Directorate-General of the European Commission, responsible for the Environmental policy of the European Union. Initially known as DG XI, in 2010 "relevant [climate change] activities in DG Environment" were moved from DG ENV to the new DG Climate Action (DG CLIMA). It retains competence for zero pollution, circular economy, and biodiversity. It is currently led by Director-General Eric Mamer. The DG ENV supports the work of the Commissioner for Environment, Water Resilience and a Competitive Circular Economy, Jessika Roswall.

== See also ==
- Bonn Agreement
- Coordination of Information on the Environment
  - Directorate-General for the Environment (European Commission)
  - European Commissioner for the Environment
- European Federation for Transport and Environment
- European Week for Waste Reduction (EWWR)
