= Compendium of cultural policies and trends in Europe =

The Compendium of Cultural Policies and Trends is a web-based and permanently updated information and monitoring system of national cultural policies in Europe.

The Compendium originates from the Council of Europe's Programme of National Cultural Policy Reviews. The project was initiated by the Council of Europe Culture Committee and Secretariat and has been carried out in partnership with the ERICarts Institute since 1998. It is realised in partnership with a community of practice made up of independent cultural policy researchers, NGOs and national government representatives from across Europe.

The Compendium country profiles address the priority issues of the Council of Europe including those set by the Warsaw Summit of Heads of State (2005) in the cultural field like cultural diversity and intercultural dialogue. They also report on current challenges to cultural policy decision makers across Europe such as the role of new actors in a changing system of governance, the support to creativity, the participation in cultural life, and economic, legal and educational dimensions of cultural policies.

On the 1st of April 2018, the Compendium transitioned into a multi-stakeholder Association which has its seat at the Boekman Foundation, the institute for arts and culture, culture and related policy in the Netherlands. The project is seeking to reach beyond European borders too, as collaborations with the Arab region oriented NGO Culture Resource (Al Mawred Al Thaqafy) and the Asia-Europe Foundation (ASEF) have been set in motion.

The Compendium is targeted to a broad audience of policy makers and administrators, arts institutions and networks, researchers and documentation professionals, journalists and students. The information and data presented online helps to inform decision-making processes, to conduct comparative policy research and analyses, to disseminate good practice examples (e.g. in the area of intercultural dialogue) and to maintain data collections.

== Countries Covered ==
The Compendium allows users to compare policy issues in the majority of the 48 countries adhering to the European Cultural Convention. Every year, new profiles are added. The Compendium aims to include:

- Albania
- Andorra
- Armenia
- Austria
- Azerbaijan
- Belarus
- Belgium
- Bosnia-Herzegovina
- Bulgaria
- Canada
- Croatia
- Cyprus
- Czech Republic
- Denmark
- Estonia
- Finland
- France
- Georgia
- Germany
- Greece
- Holy See
- Hungary
- Iceland
- Ireland
- Italy
- Latvia
- Liechtenstein
- Lithuania
- Luxembourg
- Macedonia
- Malta
- Moldova
- Monaco
- Montenegro
- Netherlands
- Norway
- Poland
- Portugal
- Romania
- Russia
- San Marino
- Serbia
- Slovakia
- Slovenia
- Spain
- Sweden
- Switzerland
- Turkey
- Ukraine
- United Kingdom

== Contributors ==
The Compendium is realised thanks to a dedicated network of partners including governments, cultural policy experts and research institutes across Europe. Through permanent collaboration and use of an innovative methodology this network has developed into an influential community of practice for cultural policies in Europe.

== Structure of Country Profiles ==
Country profiles are researched and written by national experts using a common grid made up of 9 main chapters:

1. Historical perspective: cultural policies and instruments
2. Competence, decision-making and administration
3. General objectives and principles of cultural policy
4. Current issues in cultural policy development and debate
5. Main legal provisions in the cultural field
6. Financing of culture
7. Cultural institutions and new partnerships
8. Support to creativity and participation
9. Sources and links

The profiles are available for download in English and in additional languages.

== See also ==
- Cultural policies of the European Union
