= Näläntöjärvi =

Lake in Kiuruvesi, Finland

- Location within Finland
- Coordinates: 63°48.5′N 26°29′E
- Basin countries: Finland

Näläntöjärvi (Finnish: ['nælæntøˌjærʋi]) is a lake in Kiuruvesi, Finland. It is the largest lake in Finland with nutrient loading from surrounding forestry and agriculture, which has caused periodic algal blooms in the summer. Efforts to reduce these nutrient levels to align with regional conservation measures aimed at preserving the lake's ecological balance are being carried out.

== See also ==
- List of lakes in Finland
