= Socrates programme =

Educational initiative

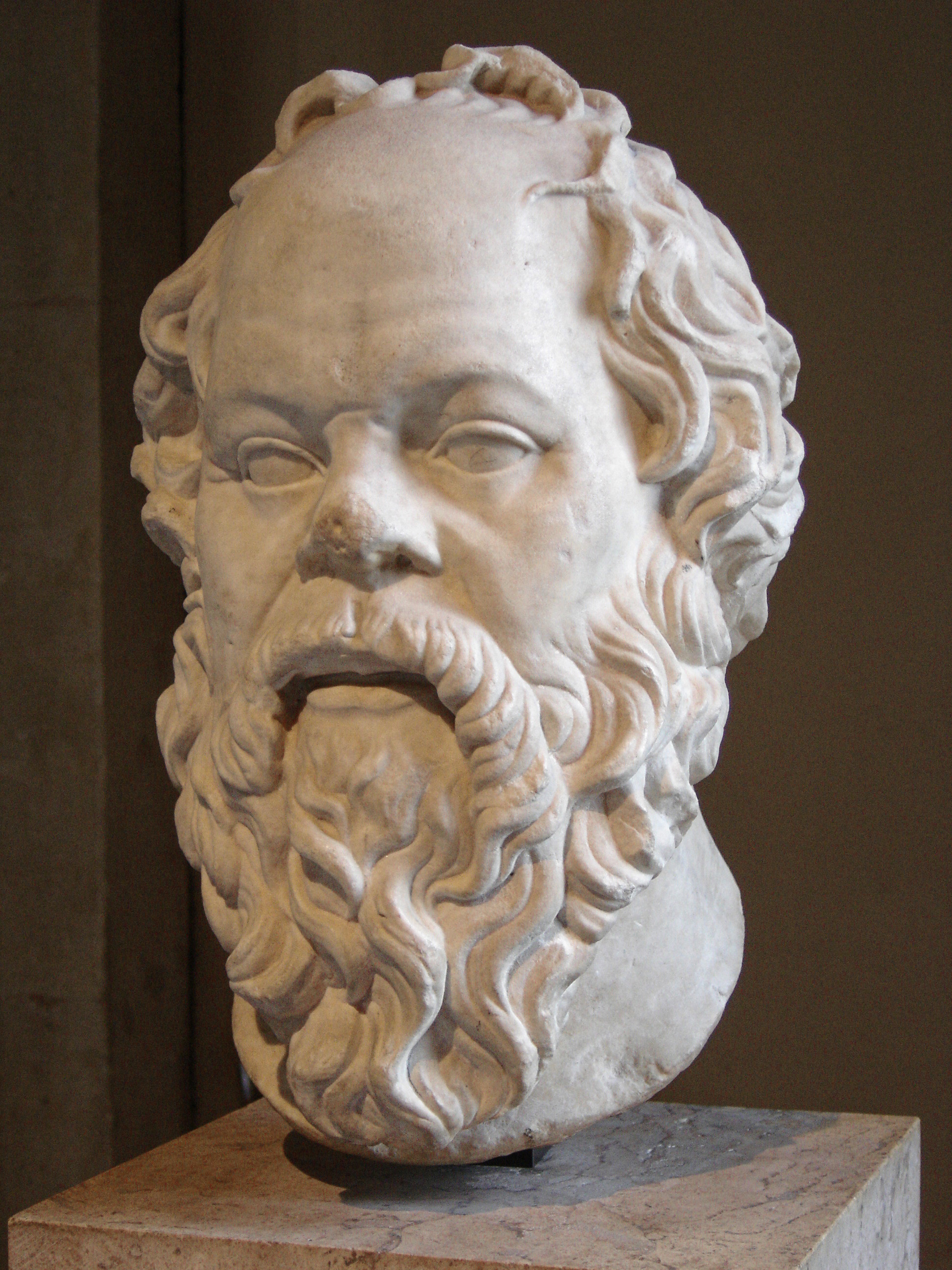
Socrates

The SOCRATES programme was an educational initiative of the European Commission; 31 countries took part. The initial Socrates programme ran from 1994 until 31 December 1999 when it was replaced by the Socrates II programme on 24 January 2000, which ran until 2006. This, in turn, was replaced by the Lifelong Learning Programme 2007–2013.

The countries participating in the programme were the then 25 European Union countries, the then candidate countries Romania and Bulgaria; Iceland, Liechtenstein, Norway and Turkey.

The programme is named after the Greek philosopher Socrates.

== Declared aims ==
- "To strengthen the European dimension of education at all levels"
- "To improve knowledge of European languages"
- "To promote co-operation and mobility throughout education"
- "To encourage innovation in education"
- "To promote equal opportunities in all sectors of education"

== Building blocks ==
- The Comenius programme – relating to primary and secondary.
- The Erasmus programme – relating to higher.
- The Grundtvig programme – relating to adult education.
- The Lingua programme – relating to education in European languages.
- The Minerva programme – relating to information and communication technology in education.

== European Union-funded language projects ==
Within the Socrates programme, funded by the European Union Directorates-General: Education and Culture (DG EAC), Information Society and Media (DG INFSO) and the EuropeAid Cooperation Office (DG AIDCO), the promotion and learning of languages is a high priority. Below is a short list of some funded projects:

1. ARGuing for Multilingual Motivation in Web 2.0. – ARGuing is a project that addresses two needs by utilizing an Alternate Reality Game; firstly, how to bridge the technological gap between educators and their students and secondly, how to motivate students to understand the benefits of learning languages at a level that impacts on their existing personal lives.
2. Autonomous Language Learning The Autonomous Language Learning (ALL) project, is building Blended Learning language courses in four European languages (Turkish, Romanian, Bulgarian and Lithuanian).
3. Chain Stories project Young students, in their first year of language learning, can complete creative writing in their mother tongue. They then pass on their story to other schools (in other countries/languages), within a chain, for completion.
4. Euromobil is an interactive multimedia language learning and information programme for nine European target languages. The EUROMOBIL project was launched in 1999 with the aim to support student mobility.
5. Tool Project Tool for Online and Offline Language Learning (TOOL) project is building Blended Learning language courses in five European languages (Dutch, Estonian, Hungarian, Maltese, Slovene).
6. Don't Give Up Motivating adult language learners to complete language courses.
7. Lullabies of Europe Collecting the lullabies of Europe to use as a very early learning language resource.

== See also ==
- Grammar Explorer
