= Directorate-General for Education, Youth, Sport and Culture =

The Directorate-General for Education, Youth, Sport and Culture (DG EAC; formerly the Directorate-General for Education and Culture) is a Directorate-General of the European Commission.

The Education, Youth, Sport and Culture Directorate-General is responsible of policies in the field of education, youth, culture, languages, and sport.

== Structure ==
DG EAC is divided into 5 "directorates":

- Directorate A: Policy Strategy and Evaluation
- Directorate B: Youth, Education and Erasmus+
- Directorate C: Innovation, International Cooperation and Sport
- Directorate D: Culture and Creativity
- Directorate R: Performance Management, Supervision and Resources

It oversees the European Union's Education, Audiovisual and Culture Executive Agency (EACEA), which handles most operational programmes on DG EAC's behalf.

== See also ==
- Bologna process
- Cultural policies of the European Union
- Culture of Europe
- Education in the European Union
- Erasmus programme
- European Capital of Culture
- European Commissioner for Innovation, Research, Culture, Education and Youth
- European Higher Education Area
- Town twinning
