= Eurydice Network =

The Eurydice Network is a European Commission-funded education information network in Europe. It consists of a coordinating European Unit and a series of national units; its aim is to provide policy makers in the member states of the European Union and in the wider European region, with up-to-date and reliable information on which to base policy decisions in the education field.

Specific studies and reports are available free of charge on the Eurydice website, along with information on national education systems, a comprehensive online Encyclopedia on national education systems in Europe.

== Origins ==
The Eurydice Network is the Education Information Network in Europe. It was established by the European Commission in 1980, following a request by the then European Community Ministers of Education in their resolutions of 1976.

In those early days of Education policy within the European Community there was considerable suspicion among some Ministers of Education of what the European Commission might do; their original action programme thus limited actions at European level to those that could not impinge on national sovereignty: this included the exchange of information and documentation. The commission established the European Eurydice Unit directly; and following some years' negotiations, the network held its first meeting in 1980.

== Structure and evolution ==
The network consisted originally of a European Unit and one or more units set up by Education Ministries in each of the then 9 member states of the European Union. These national units were normally located within Ministries responsible for Education, although in some cases (e.g., England) they were outsourced to research or documentation bodies. In federal countries (such as Germany or Belgium) the more than one unit was needed to respond to the structure of education in the country: thus, in Germany one national Eurydice Unit was established inside the documentation service of the Federal Ministry for Education; and another in the Conference of State Ministers of Education, which brings together the Education Ministers of the federal states.

This structure has continued: the addition of more EU Member States with successive enlargements of the European Union has in each case been preceded by participation of the new country within the Eurydice network. At the end of 2006 there were 35 'national' units in 31 countries. Since 2014, the network consists of 40 national units based in all 36 countries participating in the EU's Erasmus+ programme (EU Member States, Bosnia and Herzegovina, the Republic of Macedonia, Iceland, Montenegro, Serbia, Turkey, Liechtenstein and Norway). Eurydice is now co-ordinated and managed by the EU Executive Agency for Education and Culture in Brussels, which drafts its studies and provides a range of online resources.

== Areas of Work ==
Eurydice prepares and publishes a range of studies and material on all levels of education, from preprimary to tertiary and adult education, including:

- National Education Systems, the European Encyclopedia on national Education Systems and other national descriptions– e.g. Structures of Education and Training Systems;
- Comparative thematic studies of topical issues in European education, such as higher education, the teaching profession, the teaching of languages and science, the integration of immigrant children or education for citizenship;
- Indicators – e.g. Key Data on Education in Europe and subject-based Key Data on higher education, language teaching, and information and communication technology;
- Facts and Figures – e.g. School and academic calendars and Teachers' and School Heads' Salaries and Allowances in Europe.

== Coordination with other bodies ==
Eurydice cooperates closely with several European and international organisations:

- Eurostat (Statistical Office of the European Communities)
- CRELL (Centre for Research on Lifelong Learning)
- Cedefop (European Centre for the Development of Vocational Training)
- ETF (European Training Foundation)

The European Unit of Eurydice also supports the European Commission in the work it undertakes with international organisations such as the Council of Europe, OECD (Organisation for Economic Co-operation and Development) and UNESCO (United Nations Educational, Scientific and Cultural Organization)
