= Community method =

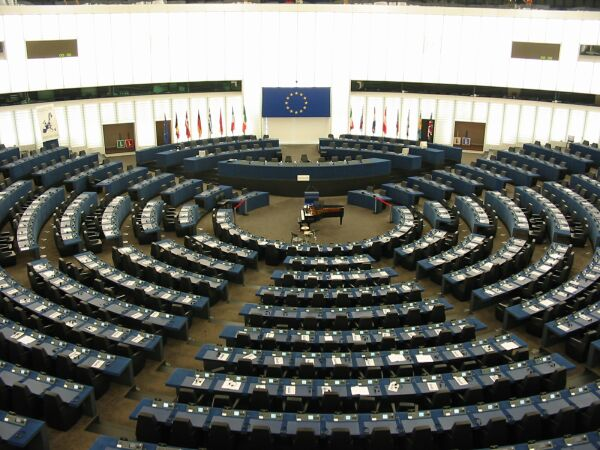
European parliament

The community method (also known as the Union method) refers to decision making processes in the European Union (EU) which emphasize the roles of the supranational decision making bodies such as the European Commission, the European Parliament and the Council of the European Union. The community method can be contrasted with intergovernmental decision making processes used in the former second and third pillars of the Union in which the European Commission and European Parliament played less important roles, and to intergovernmental cooperation outside of the formal EU processes, such as the Schengen Agreement (1985) before the Treaty of Amsterdam (1997).

== See also ==
- Enhanced cooperation
- European Communities
- Legislature of the European Union
- Open method of coordination
- Three pillars of the European Union
