= Transversal programme =

The Transversal programme is part of the European Commission's Lifelong Learning Programme 2007–2013.

It complements the main sub-programmes of the Lifelong Learning Programme 2007–2013 in order to ensure that they achieve the best results. The programme is focused on policy co-operation, languages, information and communication technologies, effective dissemination and exploitation of project results.
