= Open method of coordination =

The open method of coordination (OMC) is a relatively new intergovernmental means of governance in the European Union, based on the voluntary cooperation of its member states. The open method rests on soft law mechanisms such as guidelines and indicators, benchmarking and sharing of best practice. This means that there are no official sanctions for laggards. Rather, the method's effectiveness relies on a form of peer pressure and naming and shaming, as no member state wants to be seen as the worst in a given policy area.

The OMC works in stages. Firstly, the Council of Ministers agrees on (often very broad) policy goals. Secondly, Member states then transpose guidelines into national and regional policies. Thirdly, specific benchmarks and indicators to measure best practice are agreed upon. Finally, results are monitored and evaluated. However, the OMC differs significantly across the various policy areas to which it has been applied: there may be shorter or longer reporting periods, guidelines may be set at EU or member state level and enforcement mechanisms may be harder or softer.

The OMC is more intergovernmental in nature than the traditional means of policy-making in the EU, the so-called community method. Because it is a decentralised approach through which agreed policies are largely implemented by the member states and supervised by the Council of the European Union, the involvement of the European Parliament and the European Court of Justice is very weak indeed. Formally, at least, the European Commission has primarily a monitoring role; in practice, however, there is considerable scope for it to help set the policy agenda and persuade reluctant Member States to implement agreed policies. Although the OMC was devised as a tool in policy areas which remain the responsibility of national governments (and where the EU itself has no, or few, legislative powers) it is sometimes seen as a way for the commission to "get a foot in the door" of a national policy area.

The OMC was first applied in EU employment policy, as defined in the Amsterdam Treaty of 1997, although it was not called by this name at the time. It was officially named, defined and endorsed at the Lisbon Council for the realm of social policy. Since then it has been applied in the European employment strategy, social inclusion, pensions, consumer care, immigration, asylum, education and culture and research, and its use has also been suggested for health as well as environmental affairs. The OMC was also frequently debated in the European Convention.

Historically, the OMC can be seen as a reaction to the EU's economic integration in the 1990s. This process reduced the member states' options in the field of employment policy. But they were also weary of delegating more powers to the European institutions and thus designed the OMC as an alternative to the existing EU modes of governance.

In the following, the OMCs in the areas of employment and social protection will be analysed because they are usually considered the most developed ones. A brief introduction to the "upcoming" OMC in health is also given. However, bear in mind that the open method seems to become more and more widespread, including areas such as immigration and asylum which are not discussed here.

== Development of the OMC: from EMU to the EES ==
EMU and in particular the Stability and Growth Pact as well as the Broad Economic Policy Guidelines (which were introduced as an instrument to realise the goals set down in the Lisbon Agenda) can be considered a sort of “proto-OMC” with comparatively hard sanctioning mechanisms. As a reaction to the economic integration of Europe, the European Employment strategy (EES) evolved in the 1990s with the rationale of rebalancing monetary and economic integration. The original EES thus consisted in more or less replicating the EMU process with mid-term objectives, indicators and pressure for convergence. Legitimised through the Amsterdam treaty, the EES then became a process in its own right. As mentioned above, its principles were generalized and christened “Open Method of Coordination” at the Lisbon Summit (2000). Finally, the third phase of the EES began with the five year review in 2003 where the EES was repoliticised, due to the growing dominance of right wing governments in the EU. Nowadays the EES is a political compromise aimed to exclude both pure neo-liberal and social democratic approaches.

== The OMC in social inclusion ==
The social inclusion OMC, by contrast, was not directly linked to the EMU debate. Social inclusion was for many years a controversial topic to address at the European level due to the subsidiarity concept. In 1999 the Commission finally adopted a communication for a concerted strategy on social protection, proposing a Social Protection Committee which was made official in the Nice Treaty. Said committee was responsible for the initial standard setting exercise. Next, each member state was asked to benchmark its situation by producing a two-year national action plan (NAP or NAPincl), presenting national-level strategies for improving the situation. These were made available in June 2001. 18 months later the EU released a joint report on social inclusion where the member state's approaches were compared and contrasted and recommendations were given. While the NAPs form a first level of action, the Community Action Programme to combat poverty and social exclusion, which aims to improve cooperation between the member states, can be considered the second level of action.

In the social inclusion OMC some funds were made available for NGOs and consequently its "inclusive" approach to civil society has been favourably commented upon. However, this is not necessarily the case for other OMCs. According to FEANTSA (2005), the Pensions OMC is more closed and involves mainly the commission and national civil servants.

== Comparing the employment and social inclusion OMC ==
When comparing the EES and social inclusion OMC, Pochet (2005: 43) notes that the first seems to go more in a direction of centralization, naming and shaming without any broad discussion about the content on the European level (top-down). The second process goes more towards an experimental dynamic with the involvement of local and regional actors (bottom-up). However, the author also notes that this is probably an overgeneralization with tensions between centralization and decentralization being present in both forms.

Due to their different nature the impact of those two OMCs can be quite diverse as well. Ferrera and Sacchi (2004) analyse the impact of the EES and the Social Inclusion OMC in Italy. They conclude that the autonomous impact of the OMC has been relatively significant in the case of employment and relatively insignificant in the case of social inclusion. One key difference was the treaty status of the employment OMC which forced the Italian authorities to comply - this component was lacking for social inclusion. Furthermore, the issue of unemployment and labour market reform was simply more salient than social inclusion.

== Health ==
As member states increasingly face common concerns in healthcare (such as demographic ageing), the application of the OMC has been discussed. In March 2004 the European Parliament passed a resolution calling on the commission to present a proposal for the use of the OMC in health and long-term care. The April 2004 Communication by the Commission recommended to apply the OMC to the development and modernization of health care provision and funding. As potential advantages the Commission pointed to:

- greater consistency with existing social protection mechanism
- closer coordination with other political processes such as the EES (in particular regard to the ageing workforce), As a result, the issues of health should better reflect the Lisbon strategy
- involving the many actors in the sectors, particularly the social partners, the health care profession and patient representatives

Further steps have been taken to start the introduction of the OMC.

== Indicators and streamlining ==
The choice of indicators is of vital consequence for the OMC and critics have argued that, for instance in the Social Protection OMC, the quality of the indicators is not high enough or oriented too much on economic criteria and not social ones. Also, for health the comparability of national data has been doubted.

In the social protection field the commission is preparing to streamline the methods used in the different OMCs (social inclusion, pensions etc.). In this context, critics fear that the number of indicators will be too much reduced.

== See also ==
- Enhanced co-operation
