= Protected areas of the European Union =

Protected areas of the European Union are areas which need and/or receive special protection because of their environmental, cultural or historical value to the member states of the European Union.

- NATURA 2000
- Special Area of Conservation (SAC)
- Special Protection Area (SPA)

== See also ==
- Protected area
- Conservation designation
- Specially Protected Areas of Mediterranean Importance
