= Kiuruvesi =

- Town
- Kiuruveden kaupunki Kiuruvesi stad
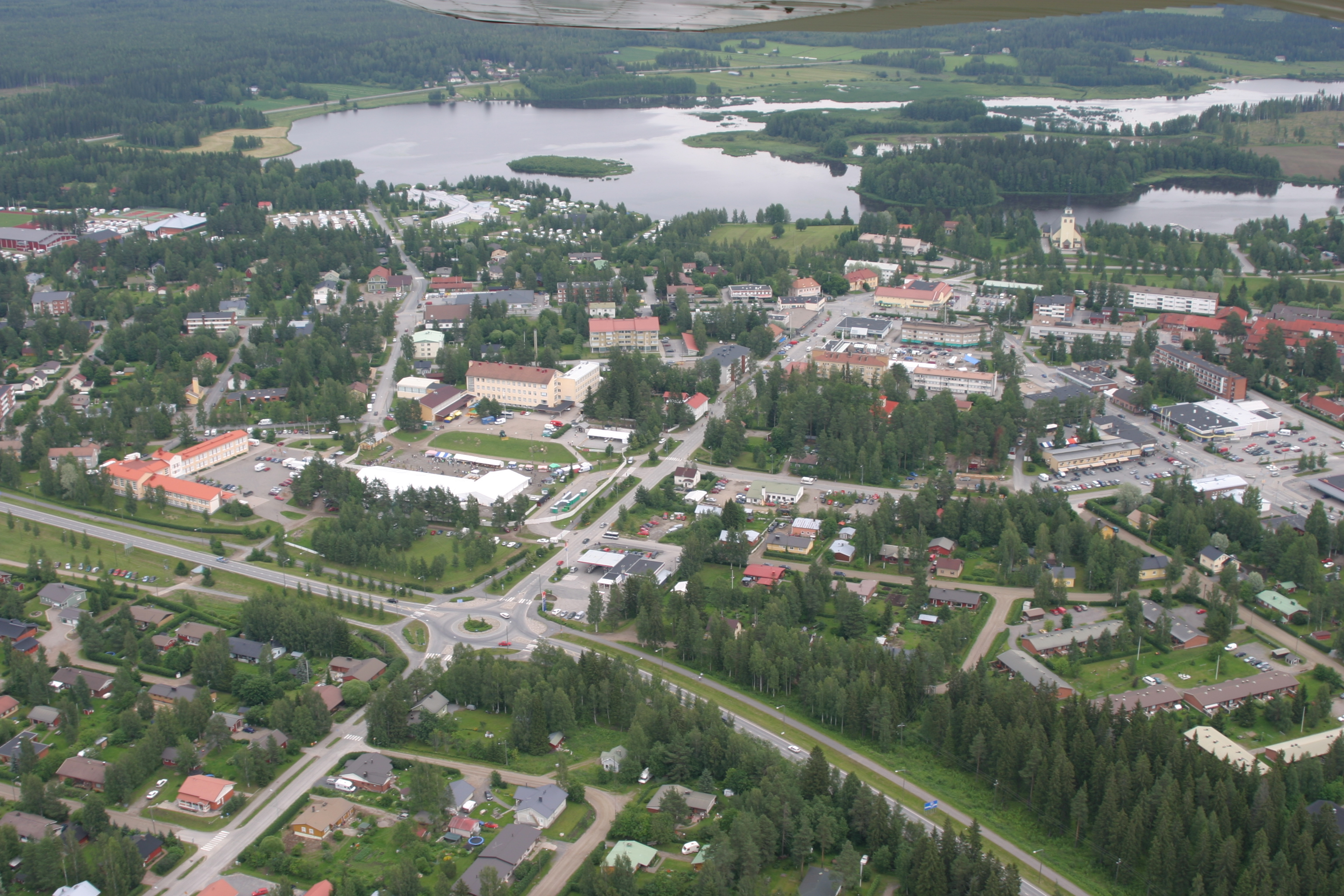

- Coat of arms

- Location of Kiuruvesi in Finland
- Interactive map of Kiuruvesi
- Coordinates: 63°39′N 026°37′E
- Country: Finland
- Region: North Savo
- Sub-region: Upper Savo
- Charter: 1873
- Town privileges: 1993

Government
  - Town manager: Juha-Pekka Rusanen

Area (2018-01-01)
  - Total: 1,422.90 km^{2} (549.38 sq mi)
  - Land: 1,328.19 km^{2} (512.82 sq mi)
  - Water: 94.79 km^{2} (36.60 sq mi)
  - Rank: 51st largest in Finland

Population (2025-12-31)
  - Total: 7,255
  - Rank: 128th largest in Finland
  - Density: 5.46/km^{2} (14.1/sq mi)

Population by native language
  - Finnish: 98% (official)
  - Others: 2%

Population by age
  - 0 to 14: 14.5%
  - 15 to 64: 54.4%
  - 65 or older: 31.1%
- Time zone: UTC+02:00 (EET)
  - Summer (DST): UTC+03:00 (EEST)
- Website: www.kiuruvesi.fi

Kiuruvesi (Finnish: ['kiu̯ruˌʋesi]) is a town and municipality of Finland located in the North Savo region. The municipality has a population of 7,255 and covers an area of 1,422.90 square kilometres (549.38 sq mi) of which 94.79 km^{2} (36.60 sq mi) is water. The population density is 5.46 inhabitants per square kilometre (14.1/sq mi). Neighbour municipalities are Iisalmi, Pielavesi, Pyhäjärvi, Pyhäntä and Vieremä. The municipality is unilingually Finnish.

The educational department took part in Lifelong Learning Programme 2007–2013 in Finland.

== Notable residents ==
- Jari Huttunen, rally driver
- Paavo Lonkila, cross country skier
- Elias Simojoki, leading figure in the fascist movement in the 1930s
- Ilmari Niskanen, professional footballer
- Berat Sadik,professional footballer

== Politics ==
After the 2025 municipal election the composition of the municipal council is as follows;

Social Democratic Party of Finland: 3 seats
Centre Party: 16 seats
Christian Democrats: 2 seats
Movement Now: 4 seats
National Coalition Party: 2 seats
Finns Party: 2 seats

== See also ==
- Näläntöjärvi
