= Comenius programme =

European Union educational project

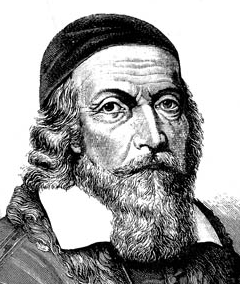
Johan amos comenius

The Comenius programme is a European Union educational project. It concerns school-level education, and is part of the EU's Erasmus + 2014-2020 Programme. It aims "to help young people and educational staff better understand the range of European cultures, languages and values". . It is aimed at all stakeholders in educational life: teachers, students, parents, parent associations, NGOs, and local authorities, among others: teachers, students, parents, parent associations, NGOs, and local authorities, among others.

Its name derives from the 17th-century Czech educator John Amos Comenius.

Education was an absolute necessity for Komensky. He advocated adapting the transmission of knowledge to each student.

== Programs ==
The program is focussed on several areas:

- The basic problems of learning motivation, and skills in learning how to learn;
- The key skills of Language learning, greater literacy, science learning, learning to support entrepreneurship, and the development of creativity and innovation;
- Digital education, both content and services;
- Improving school management, of teaching, and teacher education;
- Reducing socio-economic disadvantages and discouraging early school leaving;
- Increasing participation in sports;
- Educating groups of students with diverse abilities;
- Development of early and pre-primary learning.

The goal of the program is to have participation of more than three million students and teachers in international activities, thus improving mobility of students and teachers in the EU.

== See also ==
- Erasmus programme
- Grundtvig programme
- Leonardo da Vinci programme
- Transversal programme
- Jean Monnet programme
