= Grundtvig programme =

The Grundtvig programme was a European funding programme that was part of the European Commission’s Lifelong Learning Programme 2007–2013 and aimed to strengthen the European dimension in adult education and lifelong learning across Europe.

The programme specifically sought to address the educational challenge of an ageing population and to provide adults with alternative pathways to updating their skills and competences. The Grundtvig programme encompassed all types of learning, whether these took place in the 'formal' or 'non-formal' system of education for adults, or in more 'informal' ways, such as autonomous learning, community learning or experiential learning.

It was open to anyone in adult education, including adult learners, teachers and trainers from a variety of organisations including local authorities, non-governmental organisations, charities, universities, community groups, etc. 'Adult' in the Grundtvig programme referred to all persons over the age of 25 and all persons aged 16–24 who are no longer undergoing initial education within the formal education system.

The Grundtvig programme provided funding for a wide range of activities, including basic skills, foreign languages, parental education, arts and culture projects. All projects involved working with European partners and offered a learning and personal development experience for staff and learners.

The Grundtvig programme was named after the Danish philosopher, theologian and teacher N. F. S. Grundtvig. He was the ideological father behind the folk high school movement in Denmark. He strongly supported adult learning and that real learning came with life itself and not everything was teachable in a classroom.

== Examples of Grundtvig programme projects ==
- Let's do it creatively for the benefit of adult learners (2009-2011)
- Let's Do It Creatively ... and Environmentally with Renewable Energy (2011-2013)
- JoyAR: Joyful Adult Training Using Augmented Reality (2012-2014)
- Adult Literacy: Grundtvig Adult literacy from creating joyful learning experience into active citizenship (2013 - 2015)
