= Lifelong Learning Programme 2007–2013 =

The Lifelong Learning Programme 2007–2013 (previously referred to as the "Integrated action programme in the field of lifelong learning" or the "Integrated programme") was the European Union programme for education and training.

== Introduction ==
The Lifelong Learning Programme 2007–2013 was established by Decision No.1720/2006/EC of the European Parliament and of the Council of 15 November 2006. It was the single financial instrument available to the Commission for its directly managed education and training policies during the period covered by the European Union's 2007–2013 financial perspective. The Programme continued the main actions launched under previous action programmes (in particular, it brings together the various actions financed under the Socrates programme and the Leonardo da Vinci programme). It had six sub-programmes:

- The Comenius programme, supporting actions for schools (from pre-primary schools to upper secondary or equivalent)
- The Erasmus programme, supporting exchanges of students in higher education, as well as cooperation between universities and colleges, etc.;
- The Leonardo da Vinci programme, supporting actions in initial and continuing professional education (including student and apprentice exchanges, cooperation between colleges, etc.)
- The Grundtvig programme, supporting actions in the field of adult education
- The Transversal programme covering activities in four themed areas across all sectors of education and training: policy cooperation and innovation in education and training; foreign language teaching; development of ICT-based content and services, such as Euroguidance and Ploteus; and dissemination of results of the programme;
- The Jean Monnet Programme, supporting institutions and actions in favour of European integration.

== Objectives ==
The Programme's objectives are first, to support the development of quality lifelong learning (a reference to the first paragraphs of Articles 149 and 150 of the Treaty of Rome, which establish the European Union's duties in education and training in those terms); and thereafter to help member states of the European Union develop their own education and training systems. Although the objectives are expressed in somewhat abstract terms, they are underpinned by actions which concentrate on the creation of links between people, institutions and countries in education and training – what the programme describes as the "European Dimension" of education and training.

== Actions supported ==
The programme supports exchanges and connections between people, institutions and countries within the European Union and the European Economic Area.

=== Exchanges between individuals ===
These include (for example):

- Erasmus Student exchanges of between 3 and 12 months, in which students leave their home university and follow an agreed part of their course at another university in another country. No additional fees are payable, and the course is recognised by the home institution as part of course-work for the degree. Over 150,000 students did Erasmus student exchanges in the academic year 2005/6, and the cumulative total since 1987 is over 1,500,000.
- In-service training courses in school or adult education. The Comenius and Grundtvig programmes support participation in specific short work placements (internships) for professional students in companies in another country, to help them complete their skills

=== Exchanges between institutions ===
These include (for example):

- Developing partnerships between schools in different countries ("Comenius partnerships") to run joint projects for and with their pupils.
- Similar projects are supported in the field of adult education by the Grundtvig programme.
- Joint projects run by universities in different countries to develop joint curricula, run short-term intensive programmes, or establish thematic networks in different disciplines

=== Connections between countries ===
These include (for example):

- Study visits for regional and national administrators in education, training and guidance
- Networks of national experts working together on issues of common interest. (Note: cf. the network on ICT in education and training; example of a report at or the History Network providing materials and guidelines for researching, teaching and learning European History CLIOH-WORLD)
- Publication of comparable statistics indicating how the various education and training systems are progressing.

== Programme mechanics ==
The management of the programme was very largely decentralised to a network of "national agencies", nominated by the participating countries. All individual mobility schemes and partnerships, and many multilateral projects, will be funded through these agencies. A limited number of projects will be handled centrally either by the European Commission itself or through its Education, Audiovisual and Culture Executive Agency – a public agency funded by the Commission and operating on its behalf.

== Funding ==
The Programme has an indicative total budget of €6.970 billion over the seven years 2007–2013. Minimum seven-year allocations for each of the four bigger programmes are laid down as follows:

1. Erasmus programme: 40% (€2.788 billion)
2. Leonardo da Vinci programme: 25% (€1.743 billion)
3. Comenius programme: 13% (€0.906 billion)
4. Grundtvig programme: 4% (€0.279 billion)

The remaining budget was to be spent on other actions and administrative costs. In 2012, the Commission's amending budget included a €180 million deficit.
