= Scenic route =

Specially designated road or waterway of interest

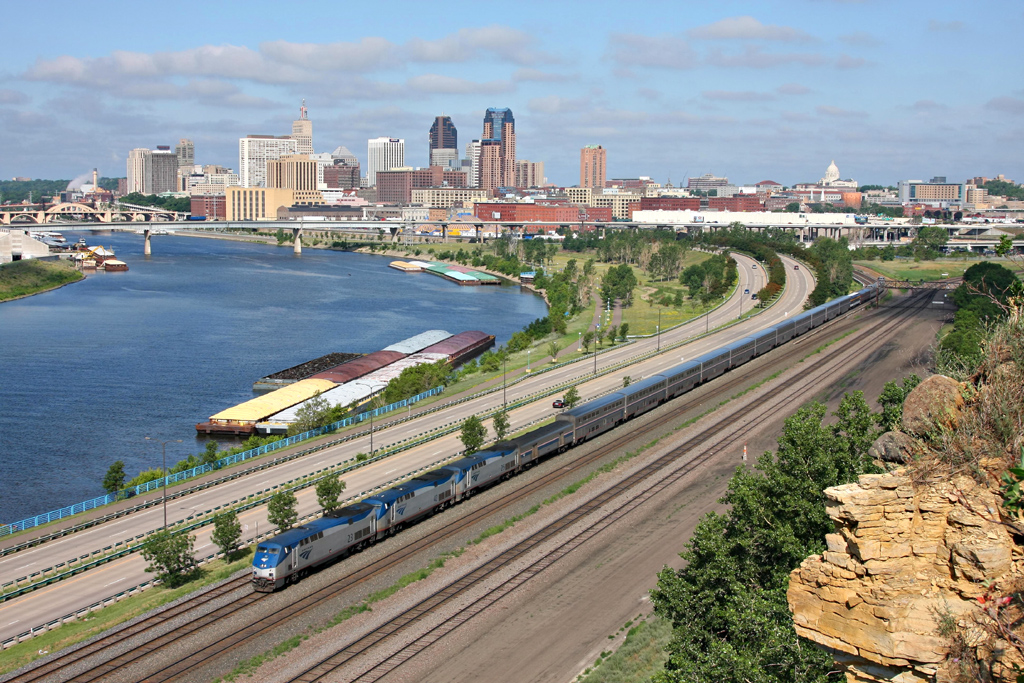
A scenic route in Saint Paul, Minnesota

A scenic route, tourist road, tourist drive, scenic byway, or holiday road is a specially designated road or waterway that travels through an area of natural or cultural beauty. It often passes by scenic viewpoints. The designation is usually determined by a governmental body, such as a Department of Transportation or a Ministry of Transport.

== Tourist highway ==
A tourist highway, tourist route, or holiday route is a road that is marketed as being particularly suited for tourists. Tourist highways may be formed when existing roads are promoted with traffic signs and advertising material. Some tourist highways, such as the Blue Ridge Parkway, are built especially for tourism purposes. Others may be roadways enjoyed by local citizens in areas of unique or exceptional natural beauty, such as the Lake District. Still others, such as the Lincoln Highway in Illinois, are former main roads, only designated as "scenic" after most traffic bypasses them (termed scenic highway in the United States). Some tourist routes, such as Great West Way, can be described as 'multi-modal', able to be followed by a mix of transportation types, including road, waterway, rail, bicycle or on foot.

In Europe and other countries around the world, they are often marked with brown tourist signs with the individual route symbol or name, or both.

=== United States ===
Marker used for National Scenic Byways in the United States

In the United States, a scenic route may also refer to a type of special route of the U.S. highway system that travels through a particularly beautiful area. These special routes, which boast "Scenic" banners, are typically longer than the "parent route". There is only one route in the country that remains with the official scenic designation: U.S. Route 40 Scenic in Maryland.

Scenic byways in the United States also include state, National Scenic Byway, National Forest Scenic Byways and Bureau of Land Management Back Country Byways programs which designate roads or routes as scenic byways due to some unique characteristics.

National Parkways are scenic roads in the National Park System built for recreational driving through scenic or historic areas. Unlike most scenic routes, National Parkways are built with a buffer of park land along both sides of the roadway. They also may have large satellite parks or recreation areas built periodically along their length.

Most National Historic Trails are commemorative motor routes which follow historic pathways.

== Theme routes ==
Theme routes are special theme-based tours, aimed at providing a visitor or tourist with a better insight on that theme. Being popular in Europe, they can cover anything from an individual city, a wine growing region, Dutch tulip fields, Swiss Mountains, to Norwegian Fjords. Subjects can be architectural, historical, or cultural.

Examples of theme routes:

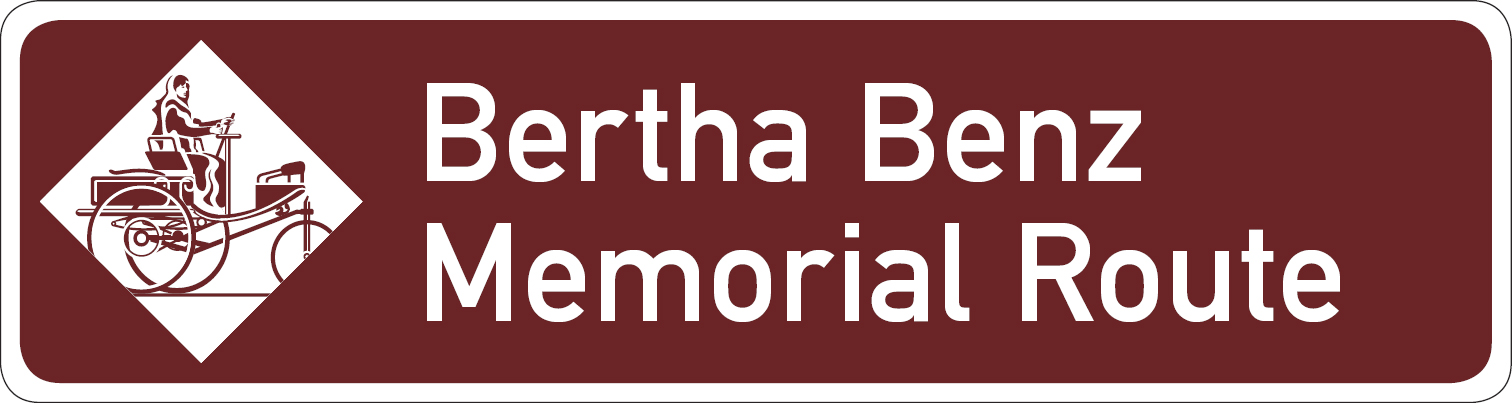
Bertha Benz Memorial Route commemorating the world’s first long distance journey by automobile of 1888

- Alsace Wine Route
- Bergstraße
- Bertha Benz Memorial Route
- Castle Road
- Cheese Route
- Deutsche Fährstraße
- European Route of Industrial Heritage
- German Wine Route
- Golden Ring of Russia of historical sites
- Great Bieszczady Loop Road
- Japan Romantic Road
- Liberation Route Europe
- Silver Ring of Russia of historical sites
- Romantic Road
- Scotland's Malt Whisky Trail
- Silver Road
- Trail of the Eagle's Nests, along a chain of medieval castles in Poland
- Upper Swabian Baroque Route
- Wild Atlantic Way
- Great West Way

== Gallery ==
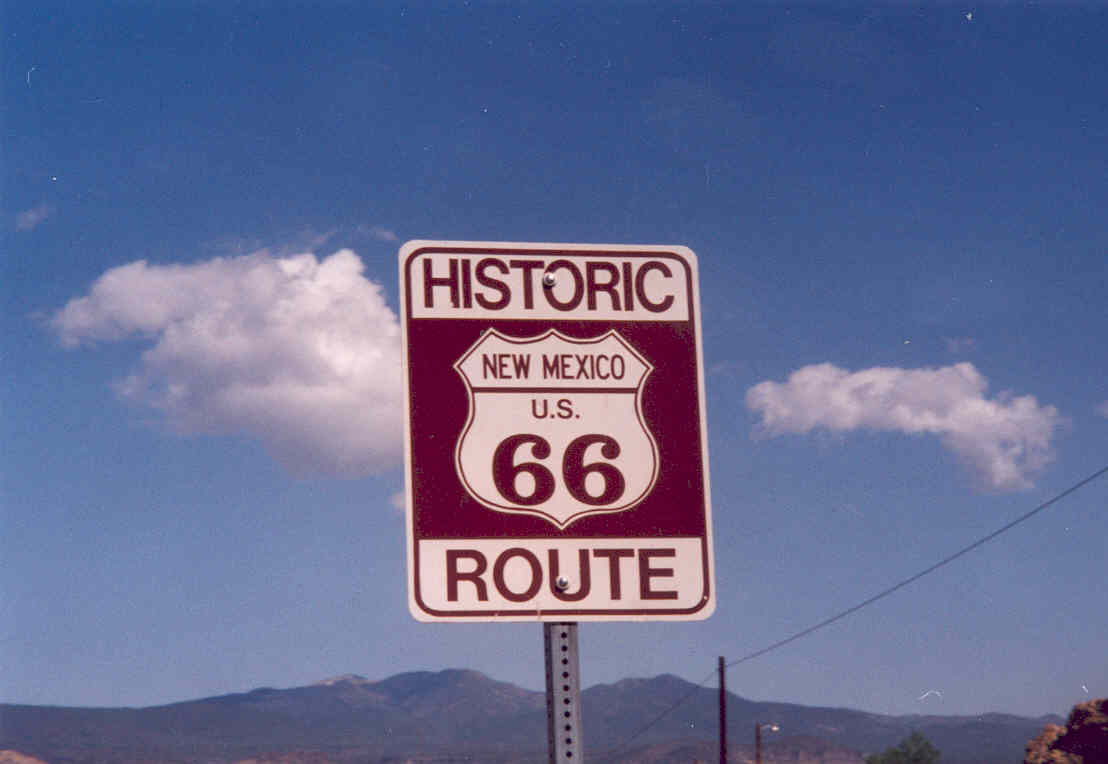
Modern-day sign in New Mexico, along a section of Route 66 named a National Scenic Byway

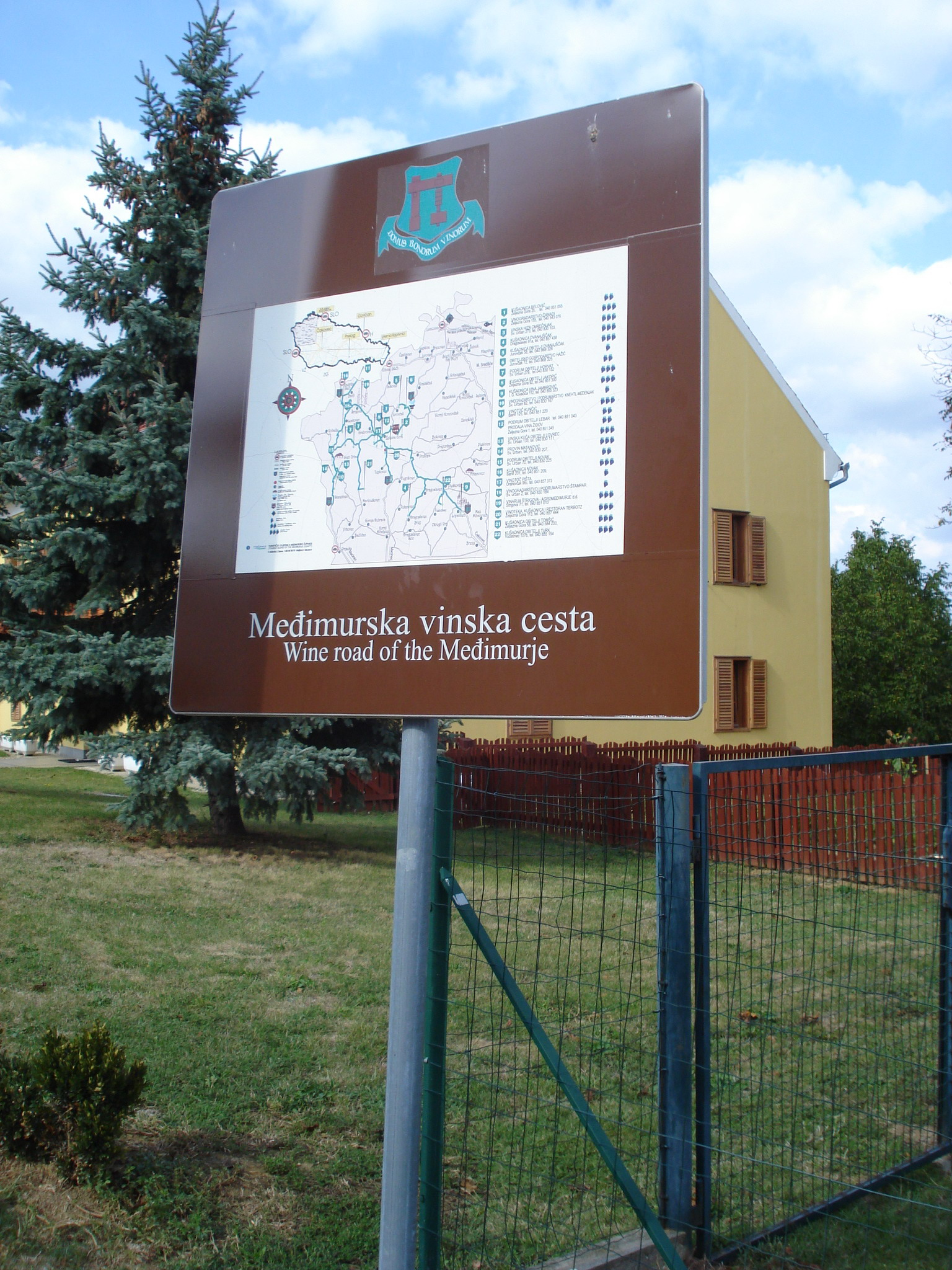
Međimurje Wine Route, Croatia

== See also ==
- Auxiliary route
- Trail blazing
- Viewshed
- Scenic byways in the United States
- National Tourist Routes in Norway
- Marguerite route in Denmark
- Asian Route of Industrial Heritage
