= The Roman Emperors and Danube Wine Route =

The Roman Emperors and Danube Wine Route, with its Danube and Adriatic Trails, extends through ten European countries: Albania, Bosnia and Hercegovina, Bulgaria, Croatia, Hungary, Montenegro, North Macedonia, Romania, Serbia, and Slovenia. The Route was certified as a Cultural Route of the Council of Europe by the European Institute of Cultural Routes (EICR) in 2015. and recertified in 2019.

Sites along the route include some of the best preserved archaeological remains in the region and present content which claims to illustrate how the Romans lived, worked and entertained in these locations.

== Themes ==
The major themes of the Roman Emperors and Danube Wine Route cultural route are related with the expansion and defense of the Roman Empire in the northern Danube frontier and the Adriatic Sea in its hinterlands. The cultural route is organized as a network of sub-destinations, located in the vicinity of individual archaeological sites showcasing important cultural heritage and monuments to the leadership of the Roman emperors in Late Antiquity. By taking the tour along the route, visitors can learn more about how the Romans lived, worked and entertained themselves.

Each destination along the cultural route presents one of the four thematic categories. The first category is directly associated with the emperors’ former presence in the destination, representing the place where the emperor was spending his life or moving together with his army to confront threats to the imperial peace. The second category is focusing on military achievements and the execution of emperors' policy especially in the terms of pacification and defending the imperial frontier. The last two categories tell the story of mechanisms that enabled continuation of everyday life, protection of the territory from invasion, more efficient production of silver and lead, adaptation of conquered tribes into specific and easily manageable administrative units. As the title of the route suggests, the route is also dealing with the theme of wine, since the culture of viticulture and vineg-rowing has been introduced in the region by the Roman army.

== See also ==
- Michael R. Werner "Traveling Experience: Roman Emperors and Danube Wine Route” Journal of Business Economics and Management, Serbian Association of Economists (Belgrade) 67, January–February 2019: 181–192; co-authored with Dr. Goran Petković, Faculty of Economics, University of Belgrade and Dr. Renato Pindžo, Ministry of Trade, Tourism and Telecommunications, Republic of Serbia.
- Michael R. Werner Sirmium, Imperial Palace Complex/Sirmijum, Kompleks Carske Palate, (in English and Serbian), 2009 Zavod za Zaštitu Spomenika Kulture/Institute for the Protection of Cultural Monuments, Sremska Mitrovica [Serbia], 71 pages, ISBN 978-86-906655-6-3
