= European Route of Cistercian Abbeys =

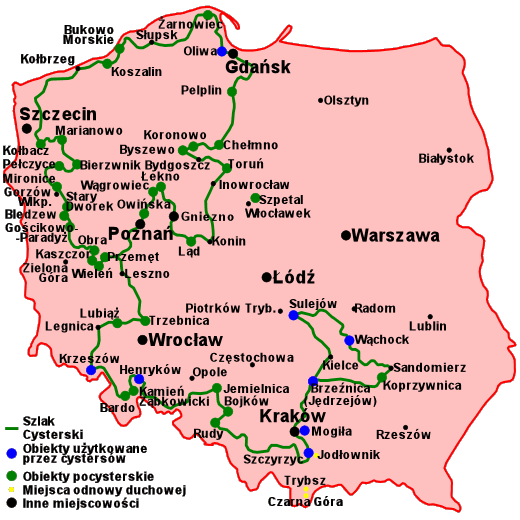
The Polish segment of the Route of Cistercian Abbeys

The European Route of Cistercian Abbeys was one of the Cultural Routes of the Council of Europe. Established in 2010, it is a tourist trail that links the monasteries of the Cistercian Order. It is an international trail which goes through the following countries: Belgium, Czech Republic, Denmark, France, Germany, Italy, Netherlands, Poland, Portugal, Spain, Sweden, Switzerland and United Kingdom.

The main objective of the trail was to "demonstrate the importance and significance of the Cistercian legacy". In 2023, the council revoked the status as a Cultural Route.
