= Neumünster Abbey =

Buildings and structures in Luxembourg City

Coordinates: 49°36′37″N 06°08′11″E

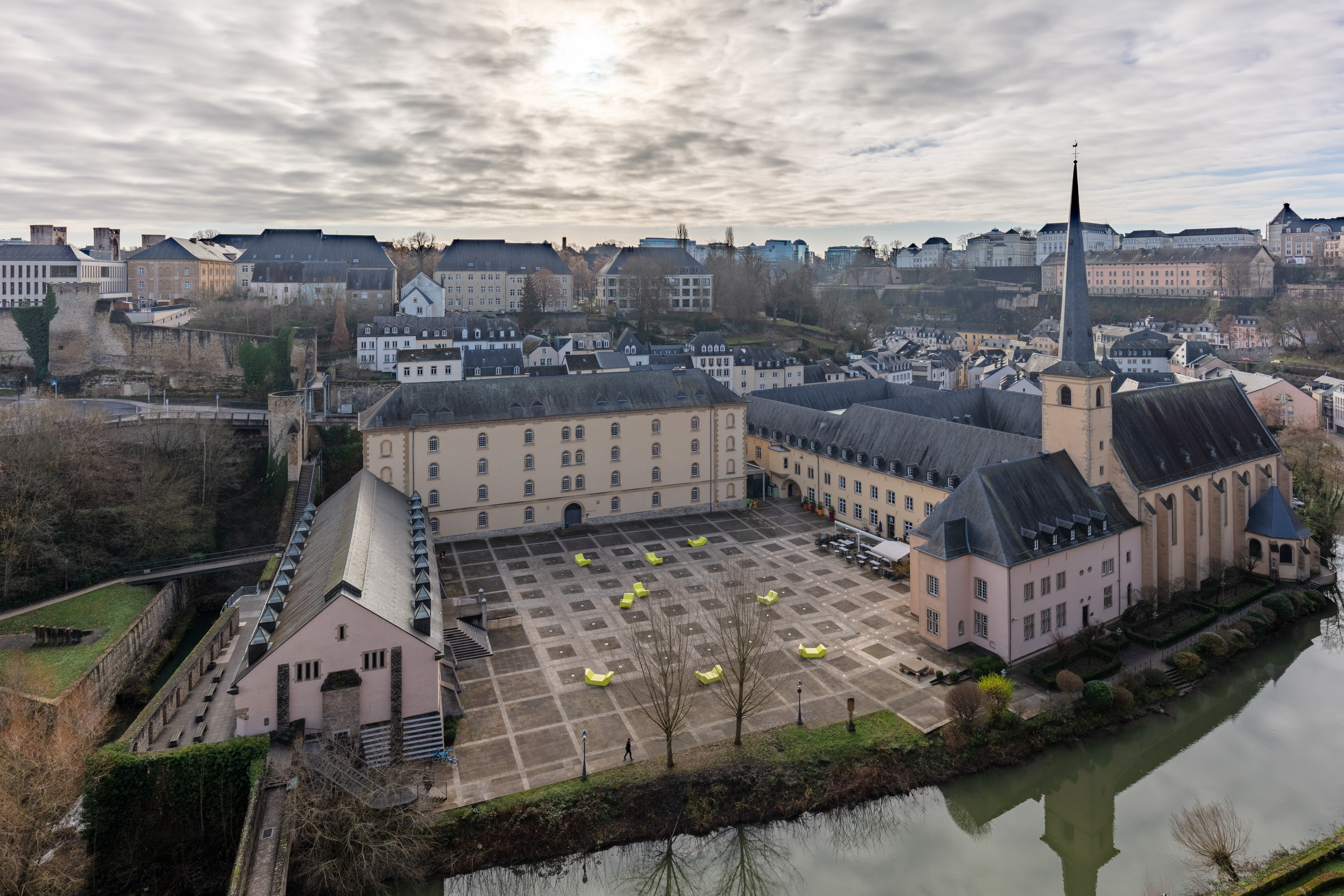
Neumünster Abbey after restoration

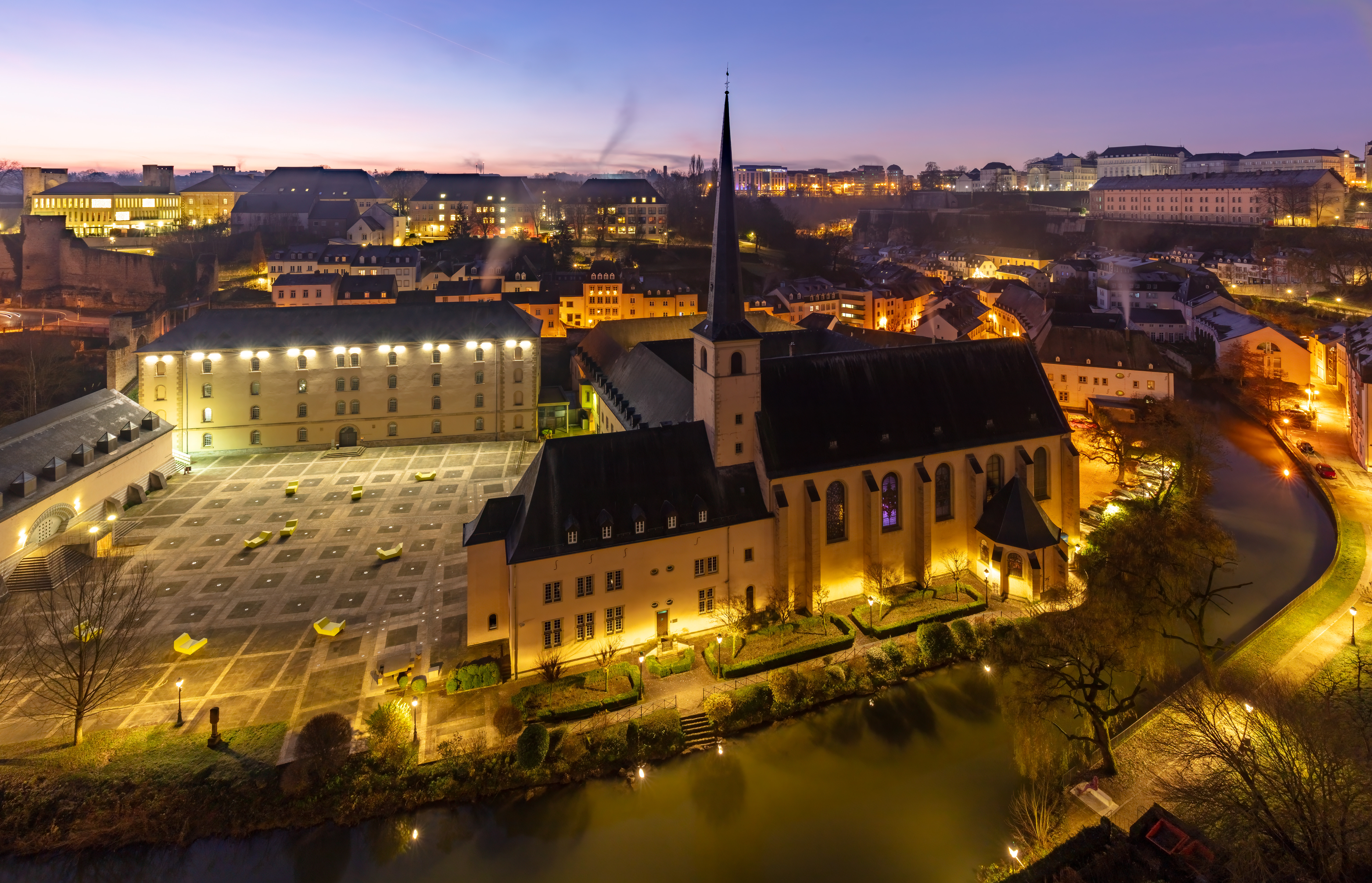
Night view

Neumünster Abbey (Luxembourgish: Abtei Neimënster, French: Abbaye de Neumünster), officially known as Neimënster, is a public meeting place, cultural centre, and former Benedictine abbey located in the Grund district of Luxembourg City in southern Luxembourg.

== History ==
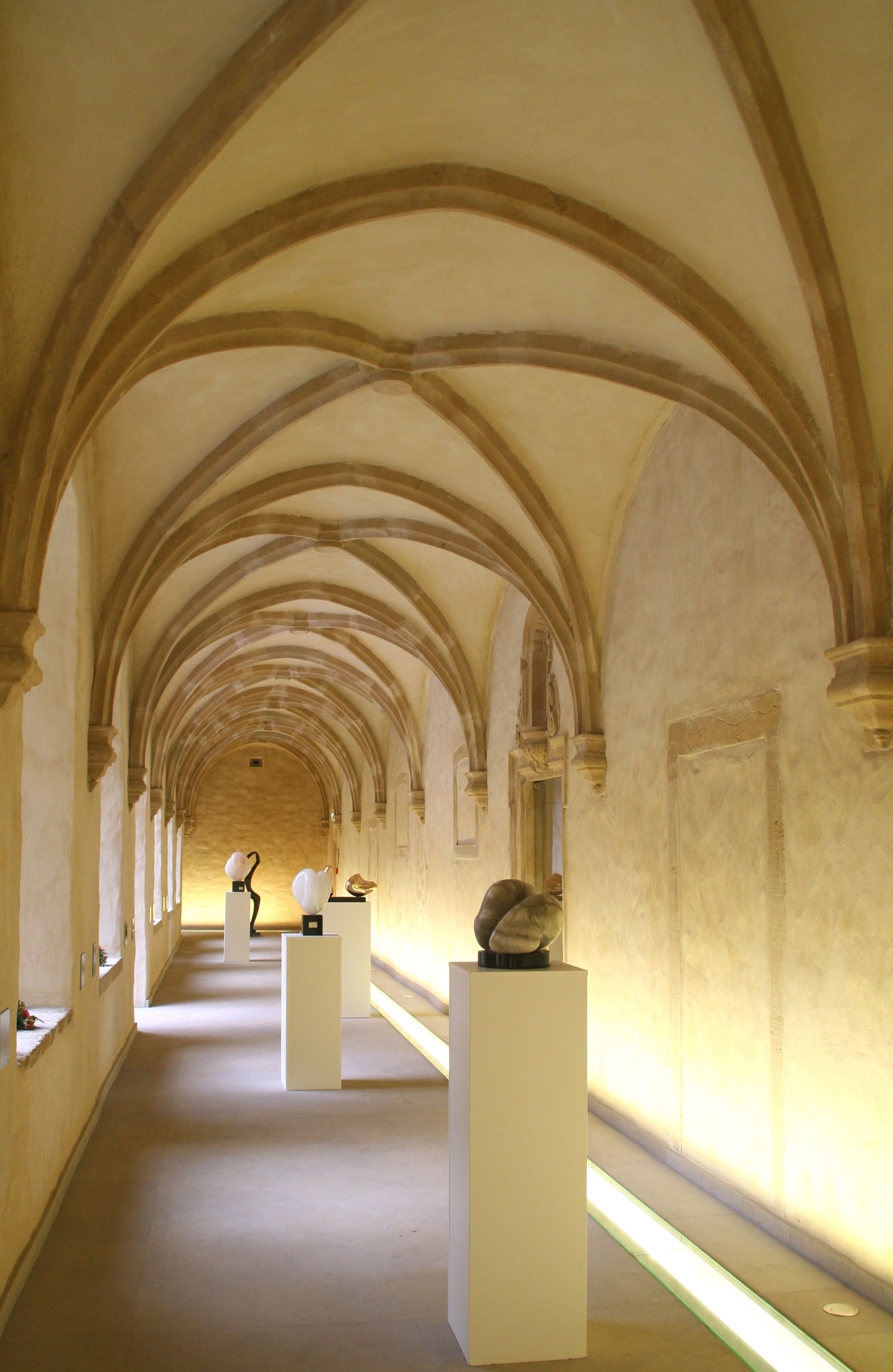
An Abbey corridor

After the original Benedictine abbey on the Altmünster Plateau was destroyed in 1542, the monks began building a new abbey or "Neumünster" in 1606 in the Grund. In 1618, a marble tomb was constructed to house the bones of John the Blind. The Abbey was destroyed in 1684 during the Siege of Luxembourg. The Abbey began to rebuild on the same site in 1688 and extended in 1720.

In 1796, the French Directory enacted legislation that secularized Luxembourg's abbeys. In 1798, the Abbey was used as a prison and barracks. In 1805, the municipality's welfare office used the Abbey for an orphanage. The orphanage operated until 1807 when a gunpowder explosion destroyed the building. After 1815, the Abbey served as a military hospital for German Confederation troops. In 1867, the Second Treaty of London declared Luxembourg a neutral and independent state, causing the Prussian garrison to leave the Abbey's grounds. From 1869 to 1985, the Abbey again served as a prison.

During World War II, the Nazis used the abbey to imprison political resisters to their occupation of Luxembourg. Among the most notable of those political prisoners was Luxembourg's best-known sculptor Lucien Wercollier.

From 1994 to 2004, the Abbey underwent restoration. It opened to the public in May 2004 as a meeting place and a cultural centre. It hosts concerts, exhibitions, and seminars. The abbey is also now home to the Lucien Wercollier Cloister, where many works from the sculptor's private collection are permanently displayed. Since 1998, it has been the home of the European Institute of Cultural Routes. Bulgaria and Romania signed their Treaty of Accession to the European Union on 25 April 2005 at Neumünster.
