= Cheese Route =

Holiday route in north Germany

The Cheese Route (German: Käsestraße) is a holiday route in north Germany, which links cheese-producing businesses in the state of Schleswig-Holstein.

Because cheese dairies are spread over the entire state, the Cheese Route runs once around Schleswig-Holstein. The first presentation of the route was in July 1999. At the start of 2000 the Schleswig-Holstein Cheese Route Society (Verein Käsestraße Schleswig-Holstein) was founded.

Its main purpose is the promotion of cheese.
