= Tourist sign =

Sign that directs visitors to tourist destinations

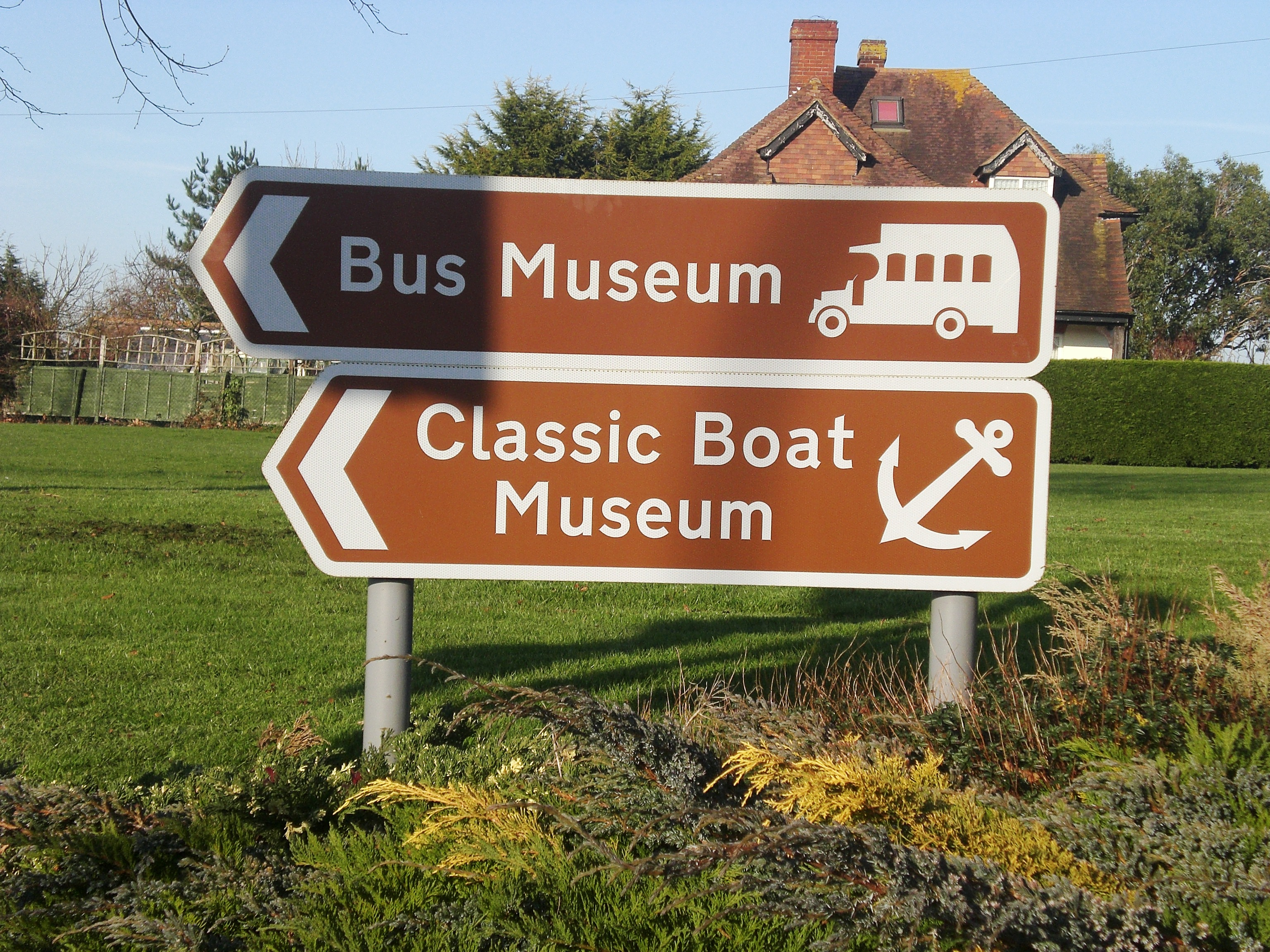
Tourist signs for attractions on the Isle of Wight

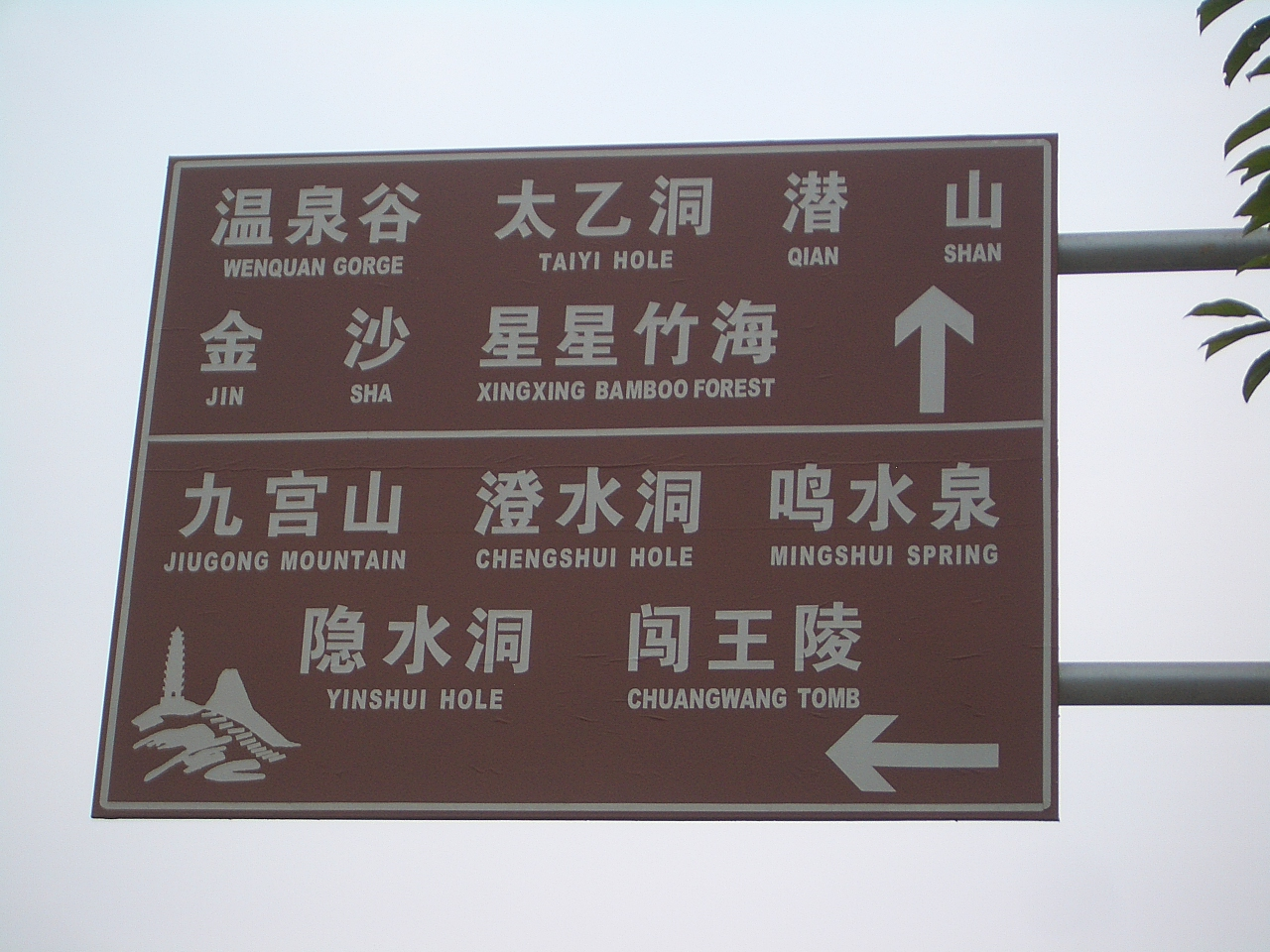
Bilingual sign in Xianning, China, indicating numerous tourist attractions

A tourist sign, often referred to as a brown sign, is a traffic sign whose purpose is to direct visitors to tourist destinations, such as historic sites, tourist regions, caravan or camp sites, picnic areas, sporting facilities or museums. By international convention brown signs with white lettering and white pictograms are often used for this purpose.

In the mid-1970s tourist signs were introduced in France. Since that time the idea of directing tourists to sights and attractions using a uniform type of signage has spread around the world. In Germany these tourist signs were first used in 1983. A sign promoting Burg Teck was erected first, followed by signs for other tourist destinations in the governmental region of Stuttgart.

== Usage ==
Tourist signs have three main applications:

- as information signs and signposts that point to important tourist destinations or places of interest in a specific area, such as within a village or a town;
- as standard signs used to mark tourist or holiday routes with special themes; or
- to herald the presence of nearby landscapes, towns and regions, usually on long-distance routes such as motorways.

== Design ==
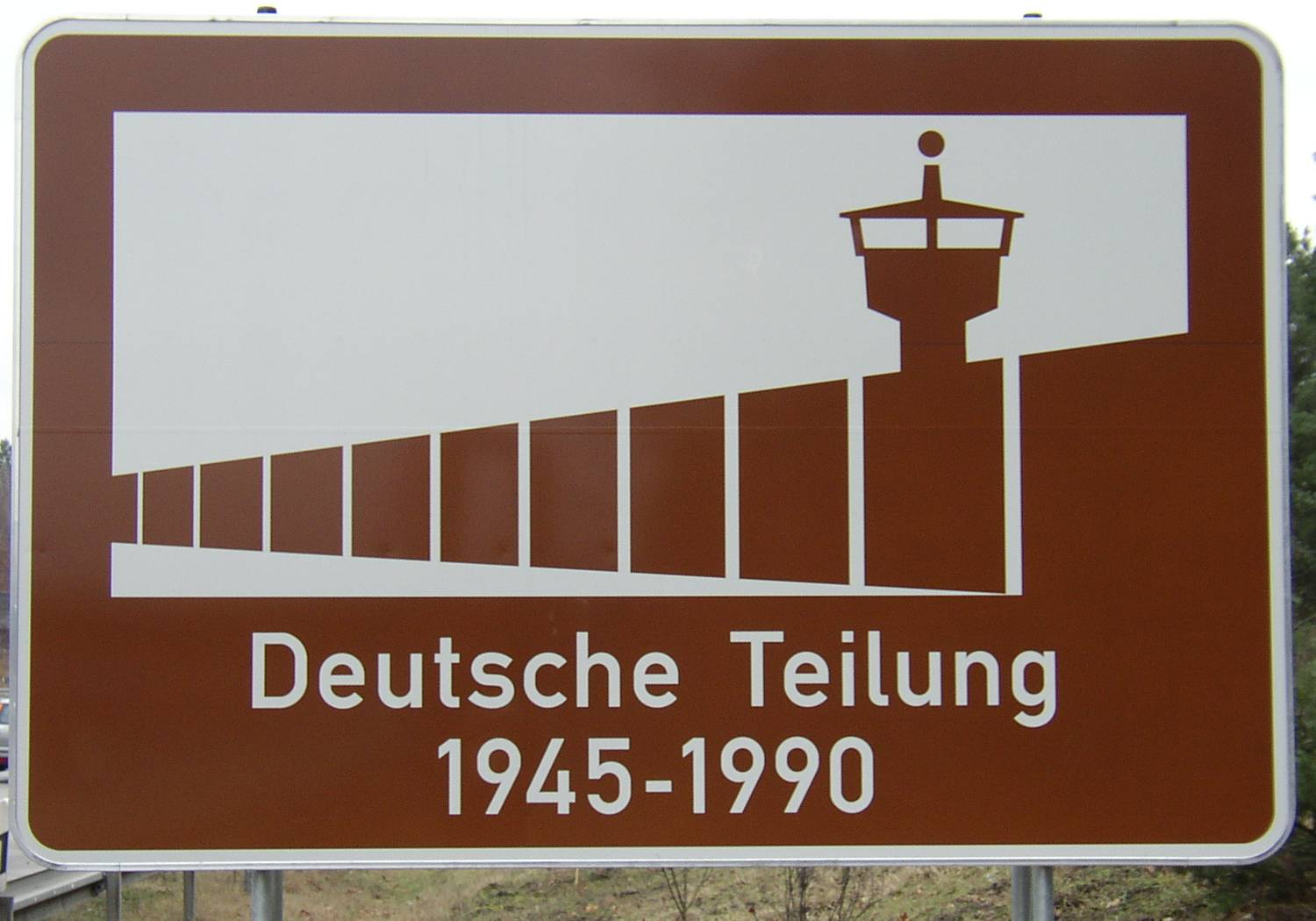
Information sign commemorating the division of Germany

Australian tourist drive route shield

In many countries the design and use of tourist signs is laid down in order to ensure a uniform appearance. In addition to their typically brown and white colours, they use sans serif fonts that are easy to read. In order to improve their usefulness for tourists dual languages may be used. The pictograms employed are designed to be simple and meaningful, and are not multi-coloured. In some countries, such as the UK, the pictograms are standardised; though there are still signs which employ the use of non-standard pictograms, such as for the National Space Centre.

== Criticism and reception ==
Critics complain that tourist signs contain too much information and distract motorists from concentrating on the road. The number of tourist signs continues to grow and less significant destinations are increasingly being signed. A study carried out at Harz University of Applied Sciences in 2019 found that one in six motorists on German freeways had already spontaneously visited a destination advertised on a tourist information board. Around two thirds could also recall specific contents of individual information boards.
