= Liberation Route Europe =

International remembrance trail

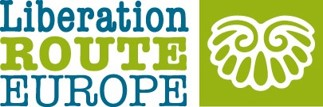
Liberation Route Europe logo

Liberation Route Europe is an international remembrance trail that connects the main regions along the advance of the Western Allied Forces toward the liberation of Europe and final stage of the Second World War. The route started in 2008 as a Dutch regional initiative in the Arnhem–Nijmegen metropolitan area and then developed into a transnational route that was officially inaugurated in Arromanches on 6 June 2014, during the Normandy D-day commemorations. The route goes from Southern England (commemorating the early years of the war) through France, Belgium, Luxembourg, the Netherlands to Berlin in Germany, then extends to the Czech Republic and Poland. The southern route starts in Italy. As a form of remembrance tourism, LRE aims to unfold these Allied offensives of 1944 and 1945 in one narrative combining the different perspectives and points of view. By combining locations with personal stories of people who fought and suffered there, it gives visitors the opportunity to follow the Allied march and visit significant sites from war cemeteries to museums and monuments but also events and commemorations. In April 2019, Liberation Route Europe became a certified Cultural Route of the Council of Europe.

== The Route ==
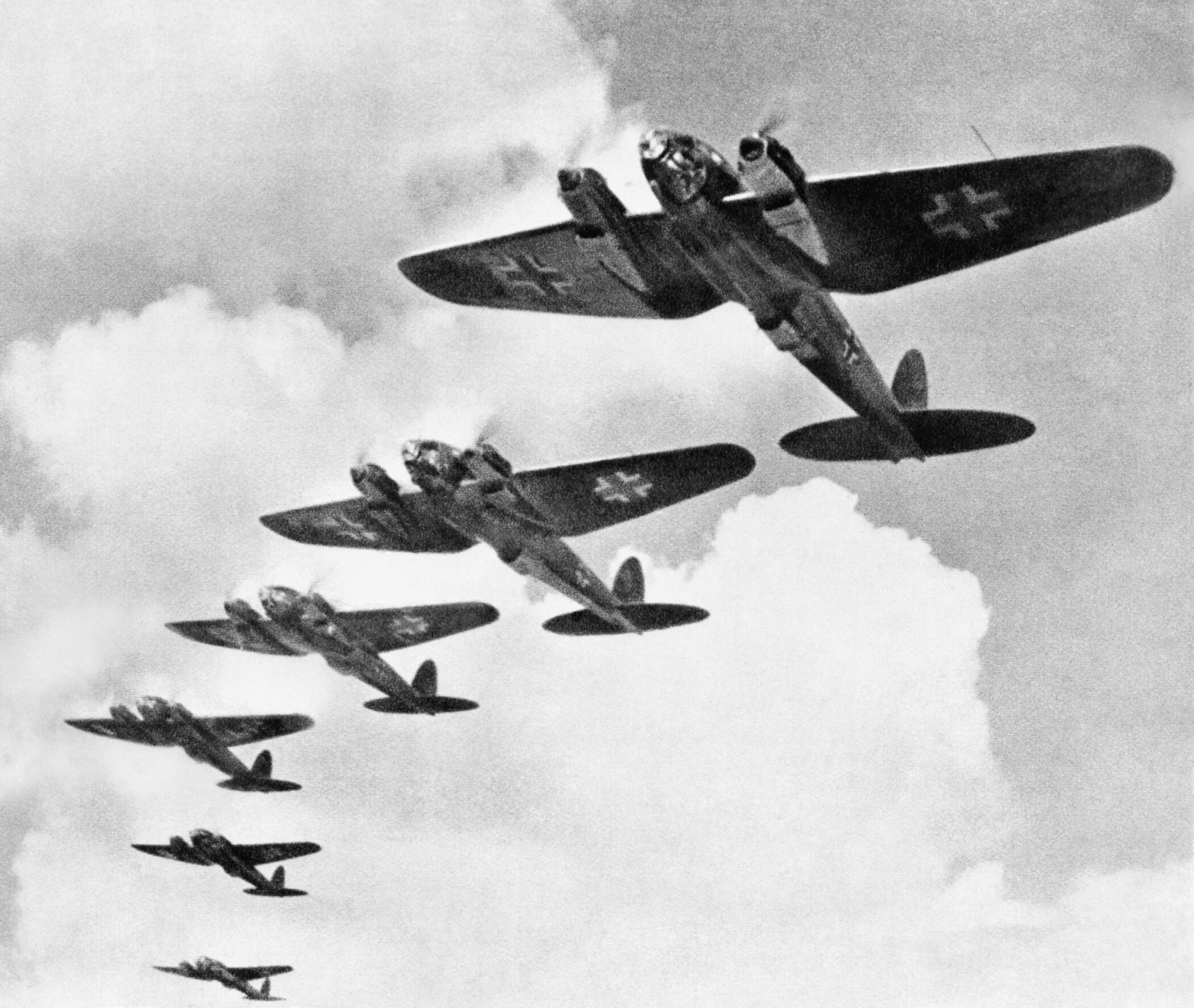
Heinkel 111s, which were used in the Battle of Britain

=== Great Britain ===
After the fall of France in 1940 and their own defeat on the continent, The Royal Air Force (RAF) defended their island. The action became known as the Battle of Britain. The route starts in London and goes through Kent (from where the Dunkirk evacuation was controlled) and Hampshire (where Operation Overlord, the D-Day landing, was planned and prepared).

Important remembrance sites

- Imperial War Museum
- Churchill War Rooms
- Dungeness
- Dover Castle
- D-Day Museum Portsmouth
- Southwick House

=== France ===
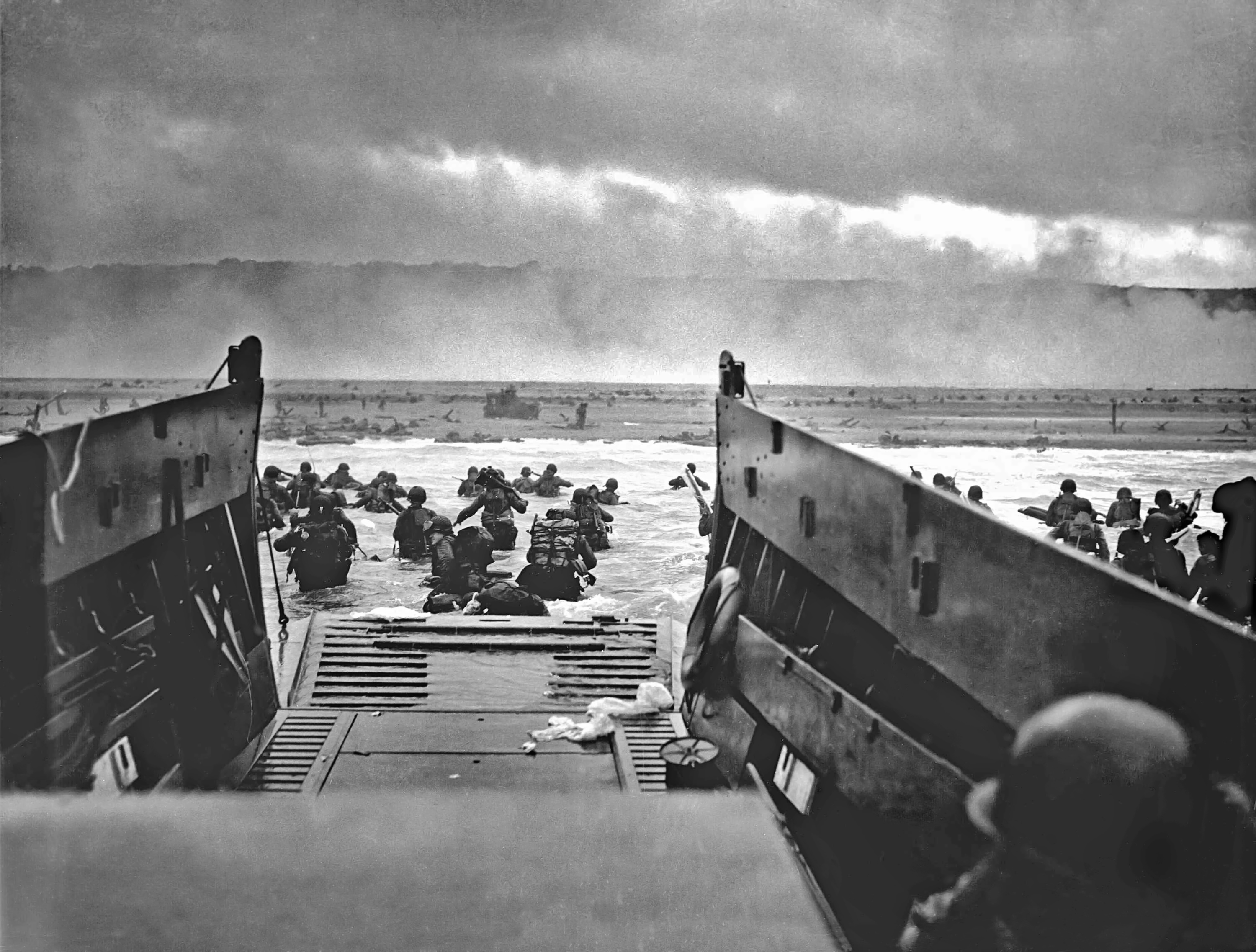
Landing on Omaha beach on D-Day, 1944

==== Normandy ====
During Operation Overlord, the largest amphibious assault in history, Allied forces landed on five beaches along an 80-kilometre (50-mile) stretch of Normandy coast on D-Day. This operation marked the start of the liberation of Western Europe. The route here comprises the five landing beaches: Omaha Beach (from Sainte-Honorine-des-Pertes to Vierville-sur-Mer), Utah Beach (Sainte-Marie-du-Mont), Gold Beach (between Port-en-Bessin and La Rivière), Juno Beach (from Courseulles to Saint-Aubin-sur-Mer), Sword Beach (from Ouistreham to Saint-Aubin-sur-Mer), along with Pointe du Hoc (Criqueville-en-Bessin) and Ranville (British Airlandings) or Longues-sur-Mer (German Battery).

The following Battle of Normandy resulted not only in the deaths of tens of thousands of soldiers, but also many French civilians. Almost all of the larger cities in the region were badly damaged.

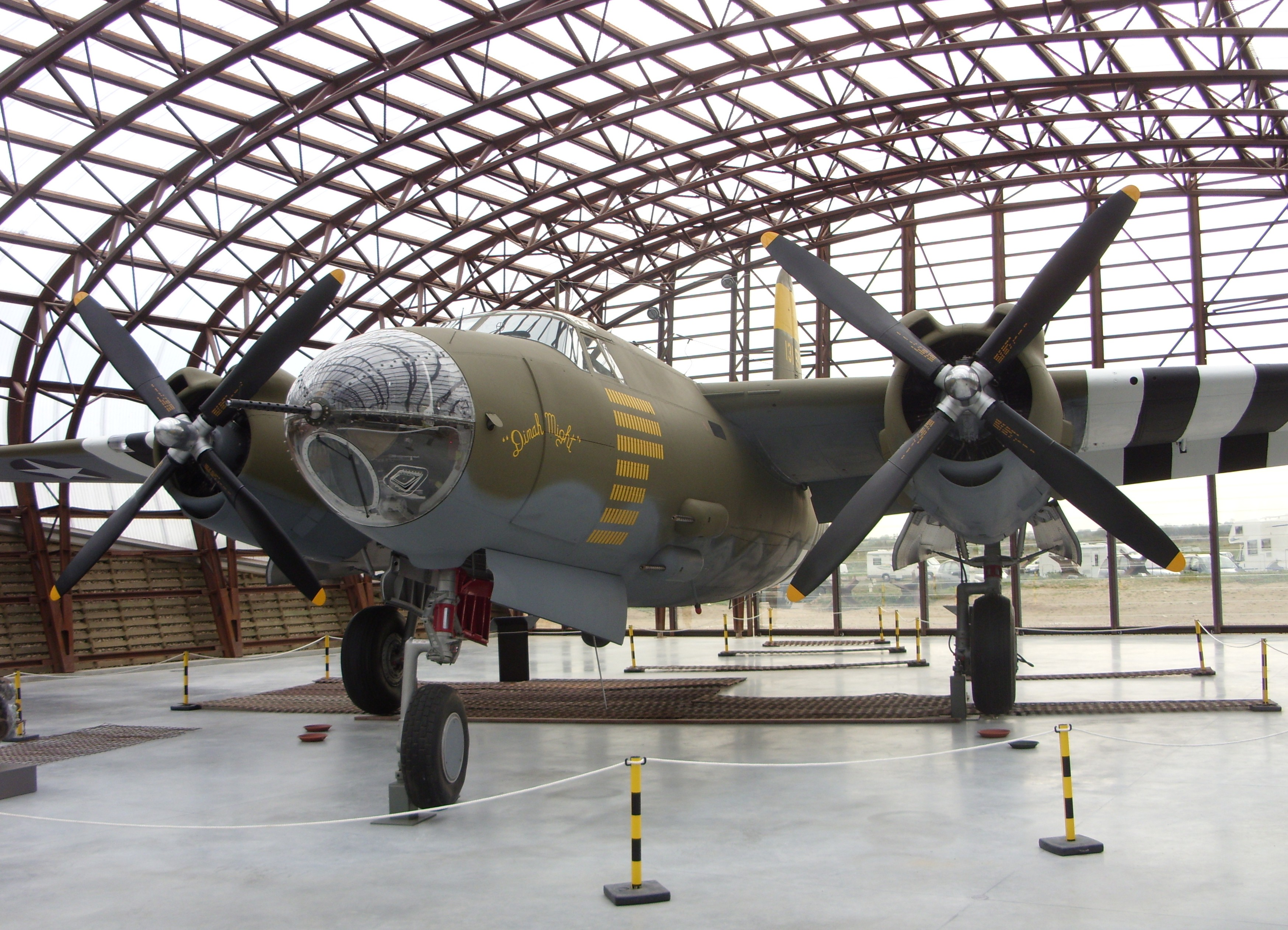
Utah Beach Museum

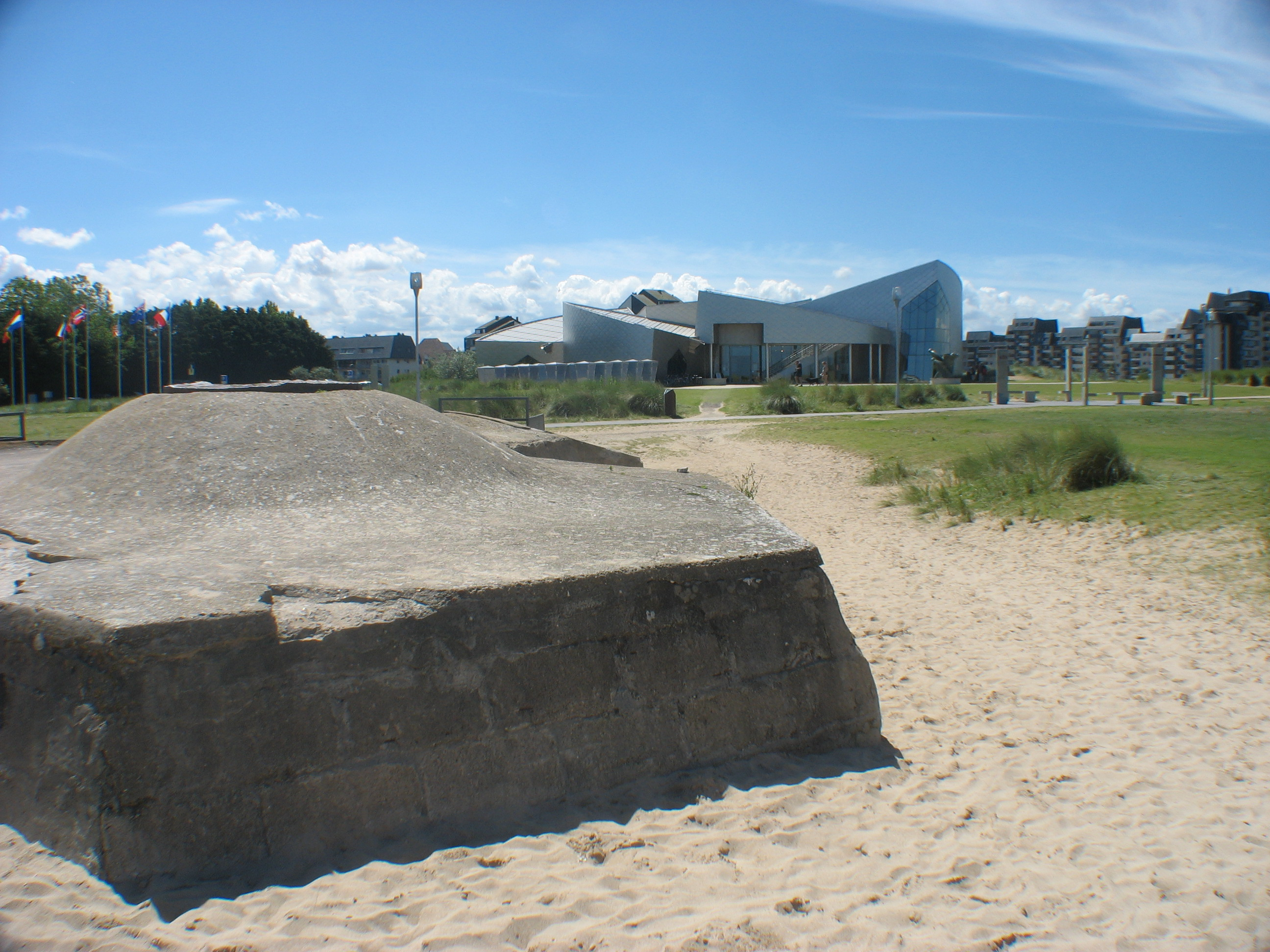
Juno Beach Centre

Important remembrance sites

- Museums
  - Liberation Museum Cherbourg
  - Juno Beach Centre
  - D-Day Museum Arromanches
  - Mémorial de Caen
  - Memorial Pegasus
  - Merville Battery Museum
  - 'The Grand Bunker' Atlantikwall Museum
  - Airborne Museum - Sainte-Mère-Eglise
  - Crisbecq Battery Museum
  - Memorial of Montormel
  - Memorial Museum of the Battle of Normandy - Bayeux
  - Utah Beach D-Day Museum
- Cemeteries
  - Bayeux British Military Cemetery
  - Bény-sur-Mer Canadian Cemetery
  - La Cambe German Military Cemetery
  - Normandy American Cemetery
- Monument
  - La Fière Bridge and Iron Mike Monument

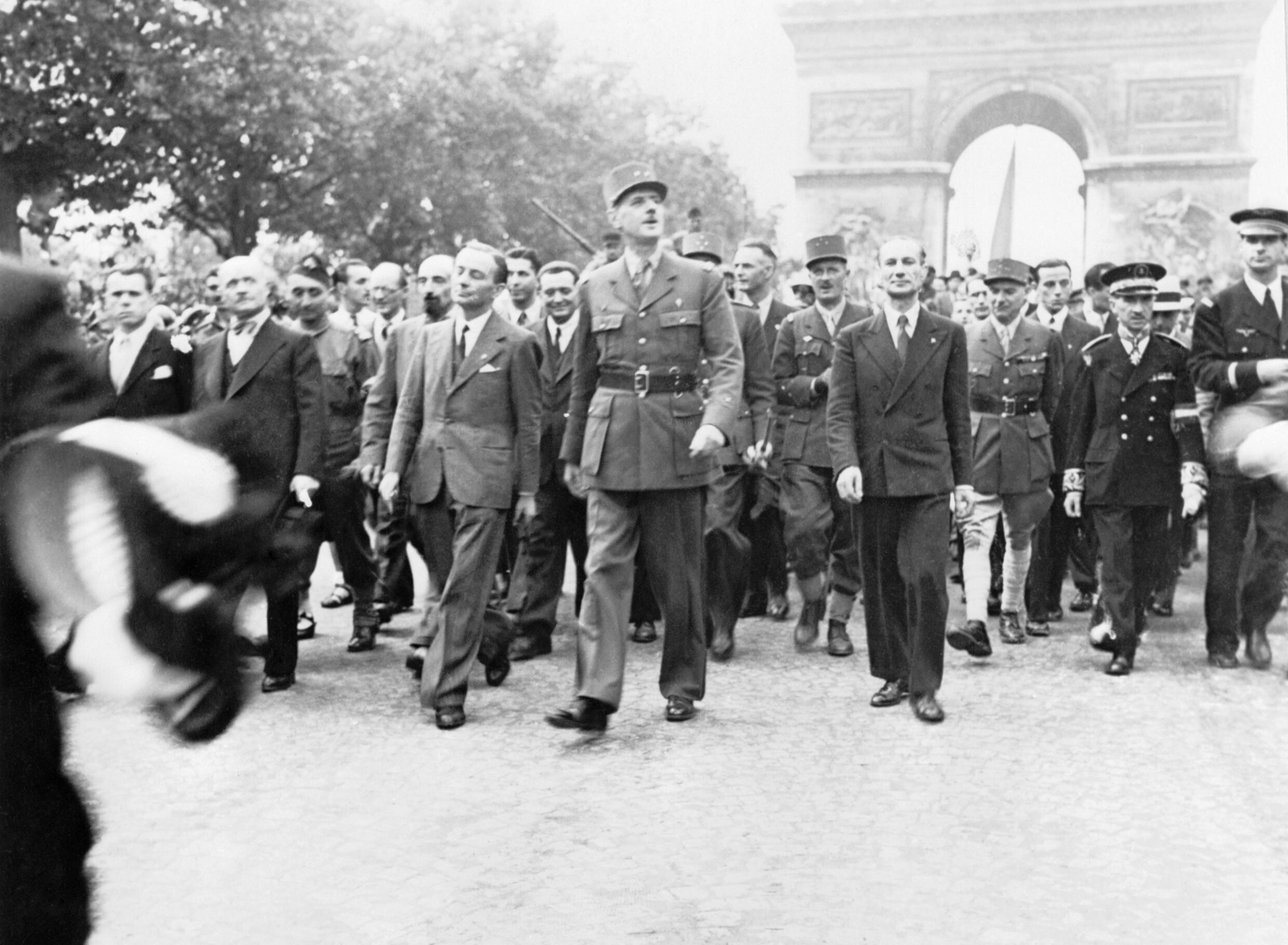
The liberation of Paris

==== Paris ====
An uprising of the population against the Germans on 19 August forced the Allies to send troops to liberate Paris, although it was not a priority. The French 2nd Armoured Division entered Paris on the evening of 24 August. The capitulation was signed on the Île de la Cité, German troops surrendered at the Montparnasse train station. Two days later a triumphal parade, led by General Charles de Gaulle, was held on the Champs-Elysées.

Important remembrance sites

- Historial Charles de Gaulle
- Memorial General Leclerc de Hauteclocque and the Liberation of Paris—Jean Moulin Museum
- Army Museum—Invalides
- Order of Liberation Museum

=== Belgium ===
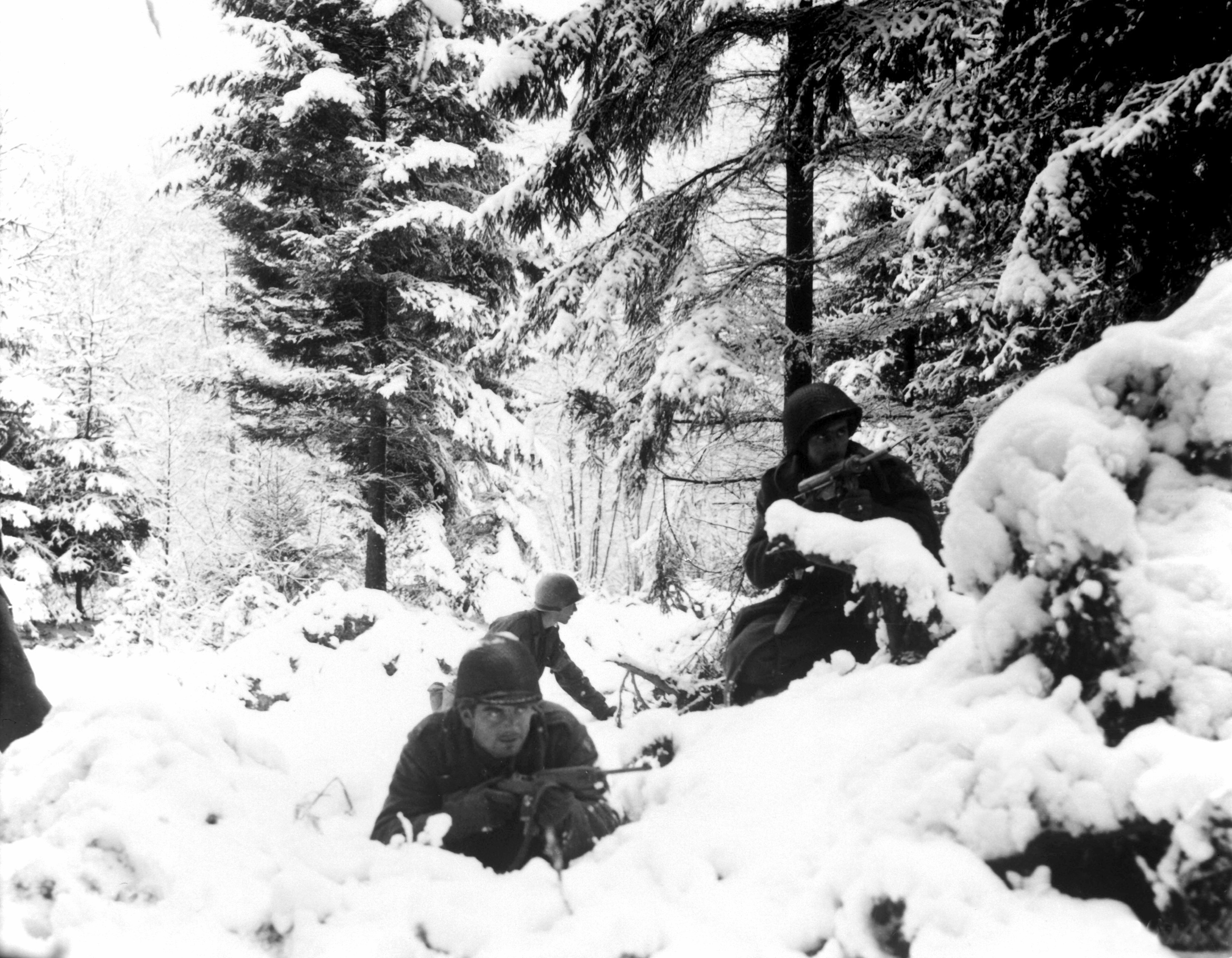
Battle of the Bulge

==== Ardennes ====
The Battle of the Bulge was the last major German offensive campaign launched through the densely forested Ardennes region. They were eventually pushed back by the Allied forces to the Siegfried Line.

Important remembrance sites

- Bastogne War Museum
- Mardasson Memorial
- Bastogne Barracks
- Battle of the Bulge Museum—La Roche-en-Ardenne
- Henri Chapelle American Cemetery

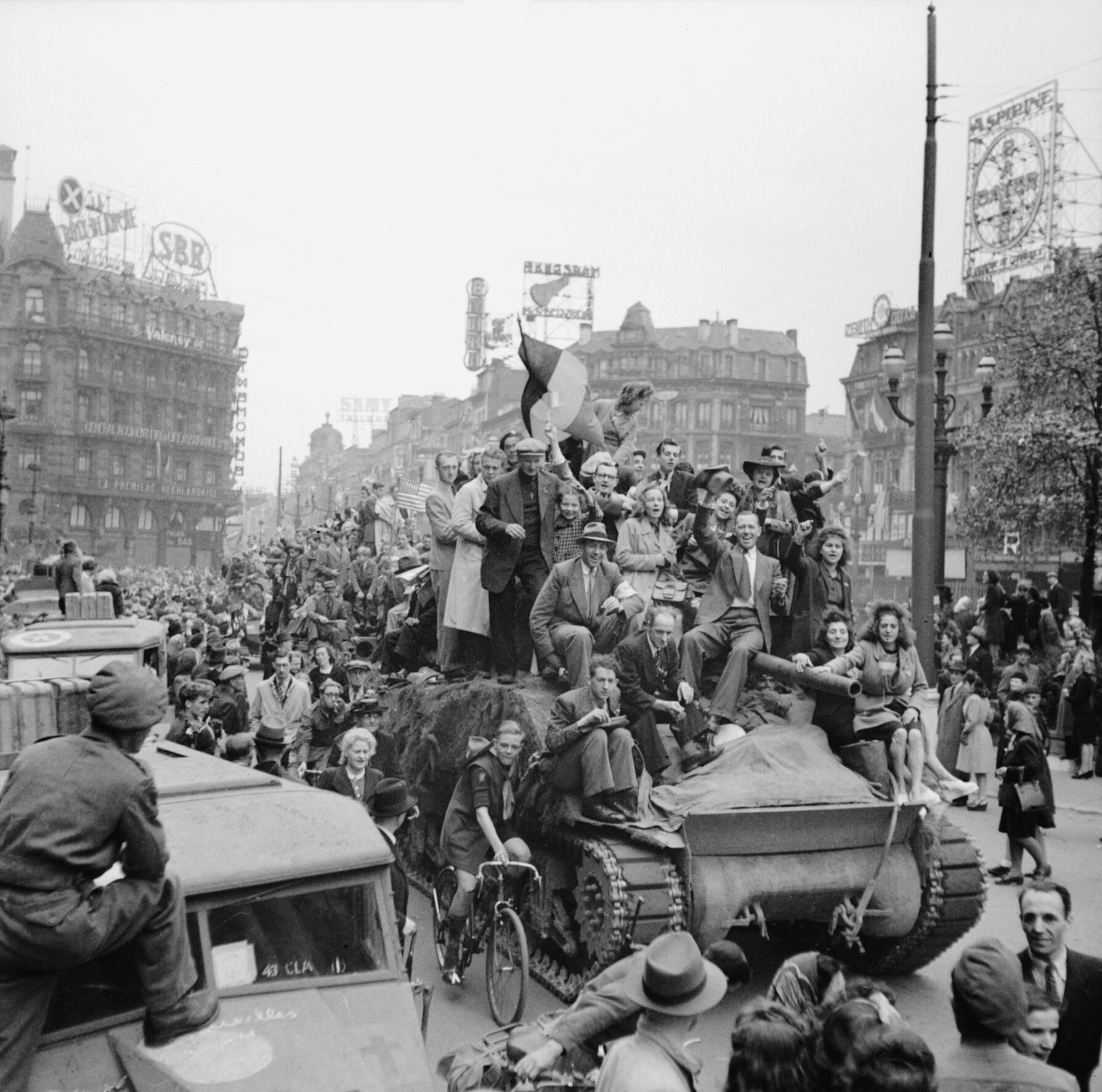
The liberation of Brussels

==== Brussels ====
Brussels was liberated on 3 September by the Guards Armoured Division of General Allan Adair including the Belgian 'Piron brigade'.

Important remembrance sites

- Royal Museum of the Armed Forces and Military History
- Kazerne Dossin
- Fort Breendonk

=== Luxembourg ===
Luxembourg was in the vicinity of the Battle of the Bulge offensive and had to wait until 12 February 1945 before being completely liberated.

Important remembrance sites

- Museum of Military History—Diekirch
- Luxembourg American Cemetery

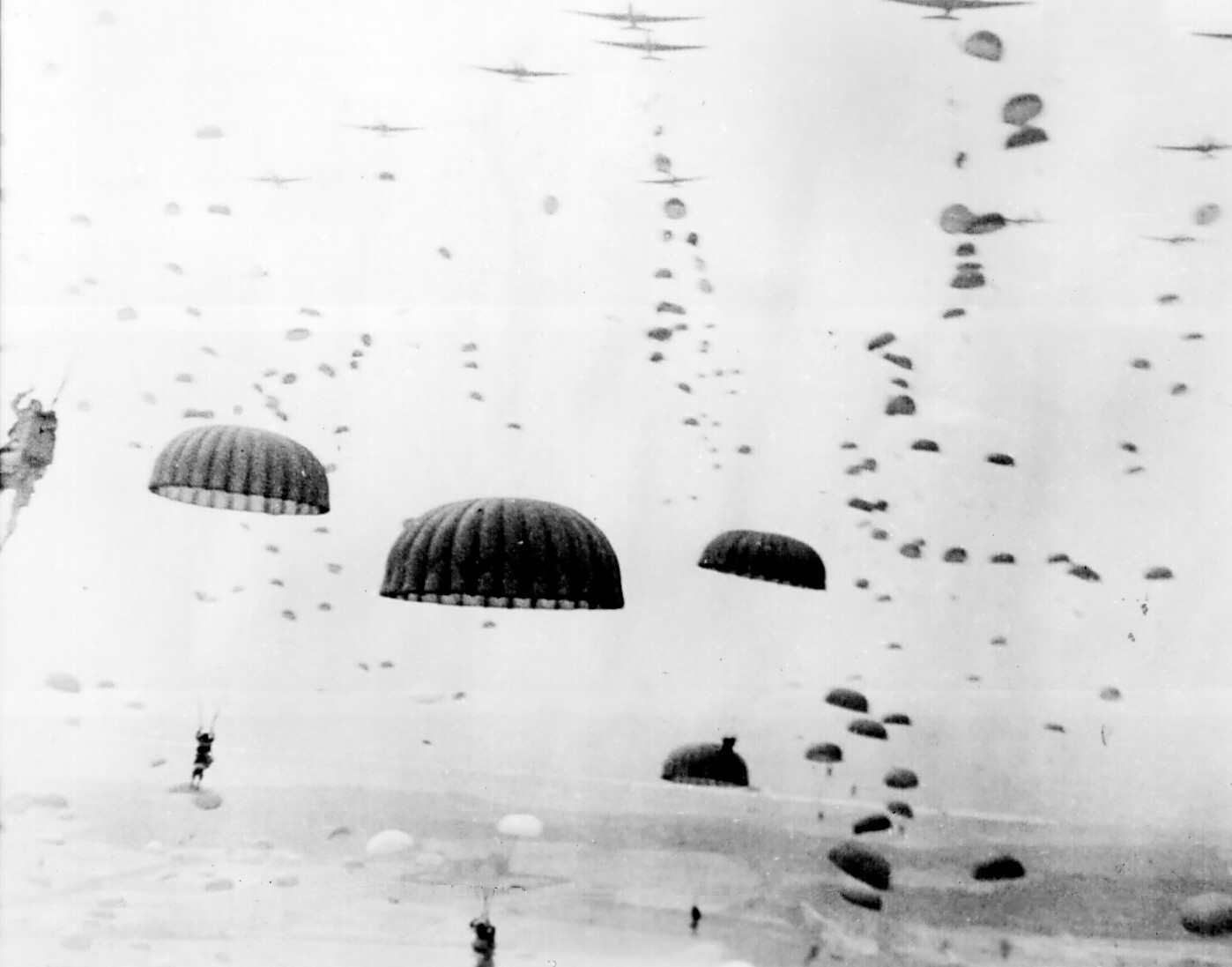
Operation Market Garden

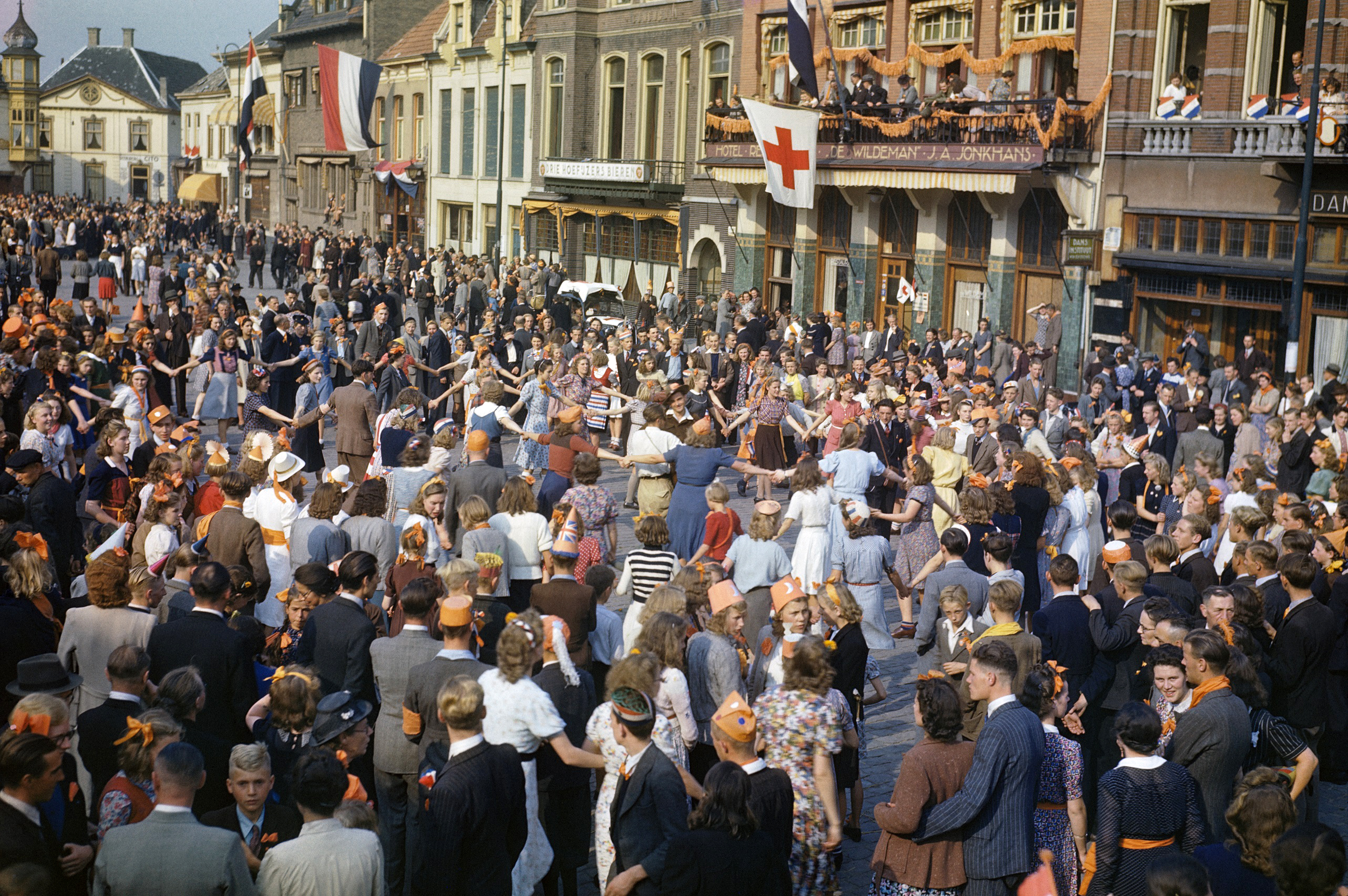
Dutch civilians dancing in the streets of Eindhoven to celebrate their liberation by Allied forces

=== Netherlands ===
The Dutch section of Liberation Route Europe is concentrated in the provinces of Gelderland, North-Brabant, Overijssel, Zeeland and Limburg. In these provinces a large network of 176 'audiospots' has been developed to combine historical sites and personal stories.

==== Gelderland ====
The main historical places on the route here are Arnhem (Battle of Arnhem) Nijmegen (Operation Market Garden), Groesbeek (Operation Veritable), Wageningen (German capitulation), Oosterbeek (Operation Market Garden), Otterlo (Liberation of the East) and Lent (Men's Island).

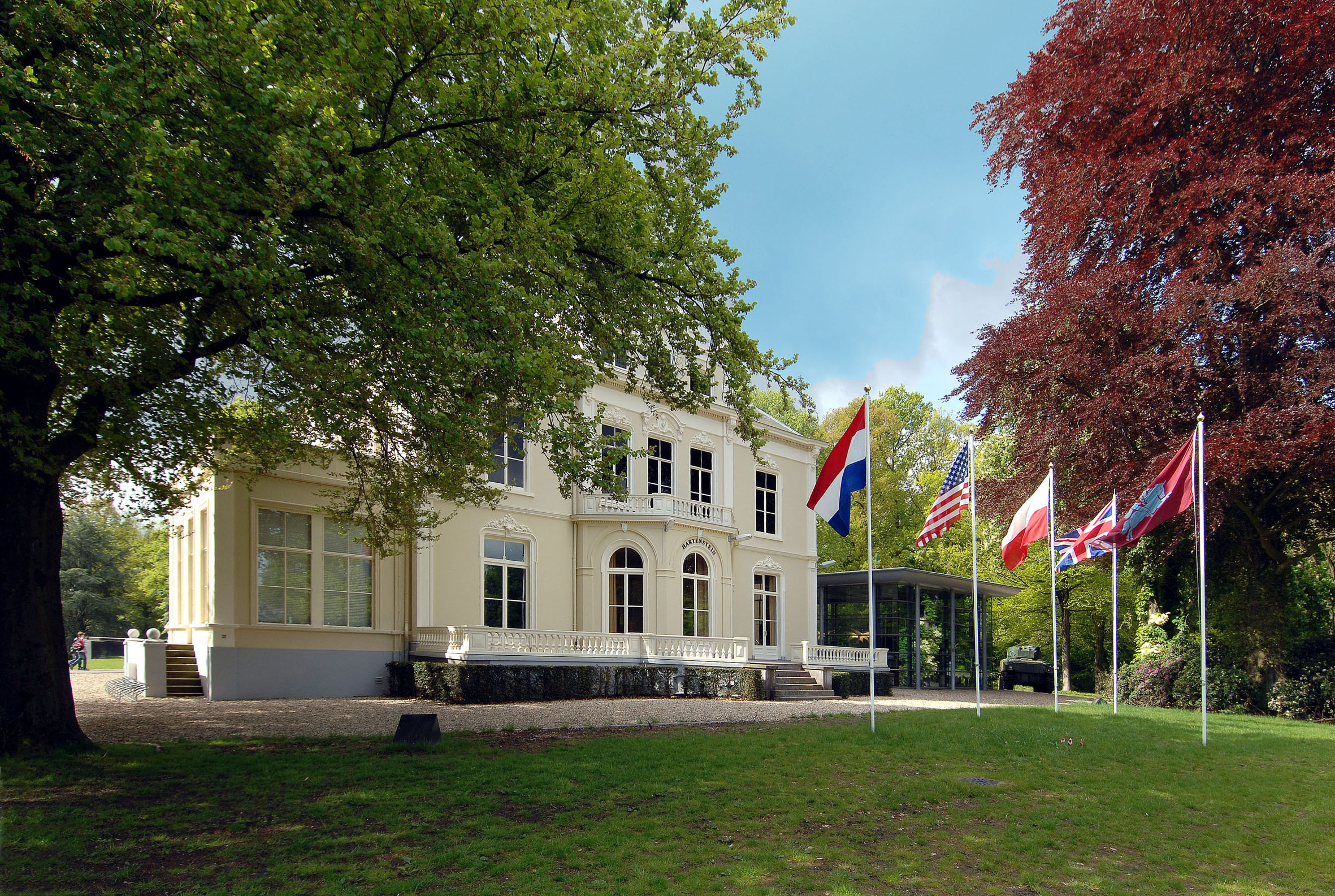
The Airborne Museum in Hartenstein

Important remembrance sites

- Museums
  - Airborne Museum Hartenstein
  - National Liberation Museum 1944–1945
  - Museum De Casteelse Poort
- Cemeteries
  - Airborne War Cemetery Arnhem-Oosterbeek
  - Canadian War Cemetery Groesbeek
  - Jonkerbos War Cemetery Nijmegen
  - Loenen Field of Honour
  - Memorial for the mass grave Huissen
- Audiospots: 76

==== North-Brabant ====
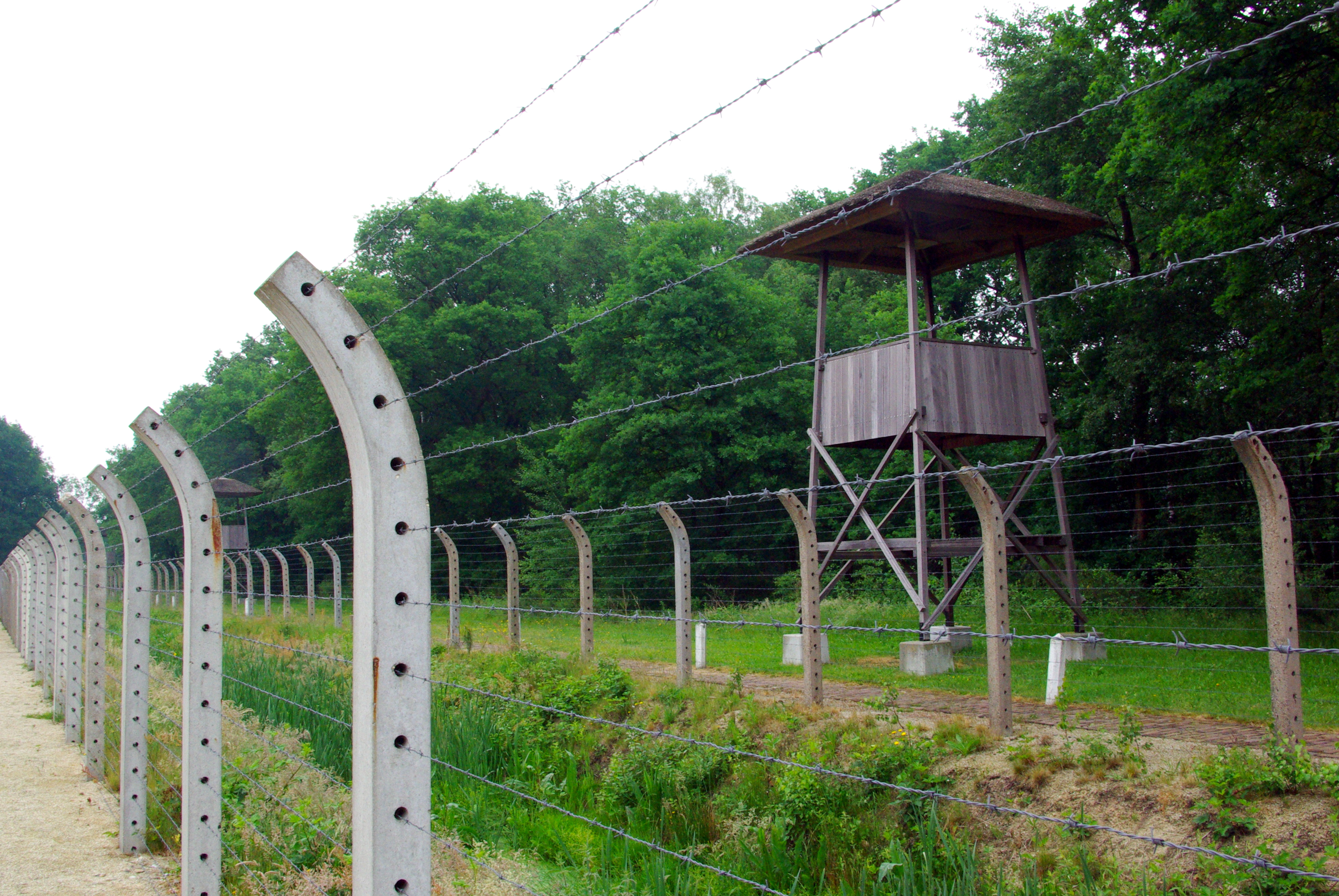
Camp Vught National Memorial

Important remembrance sites

- Museums
  - Overloon War Museum
  - General Maczek Museum Breda
  - Camp Vught National Memorial
  - Museum Wings of Liberation
- Cemeteries
  - Bergen op Zoom Canadian War Cemetery
  - Overloon War Cemetery
- Audiospots: 61

==== Overijssel ====
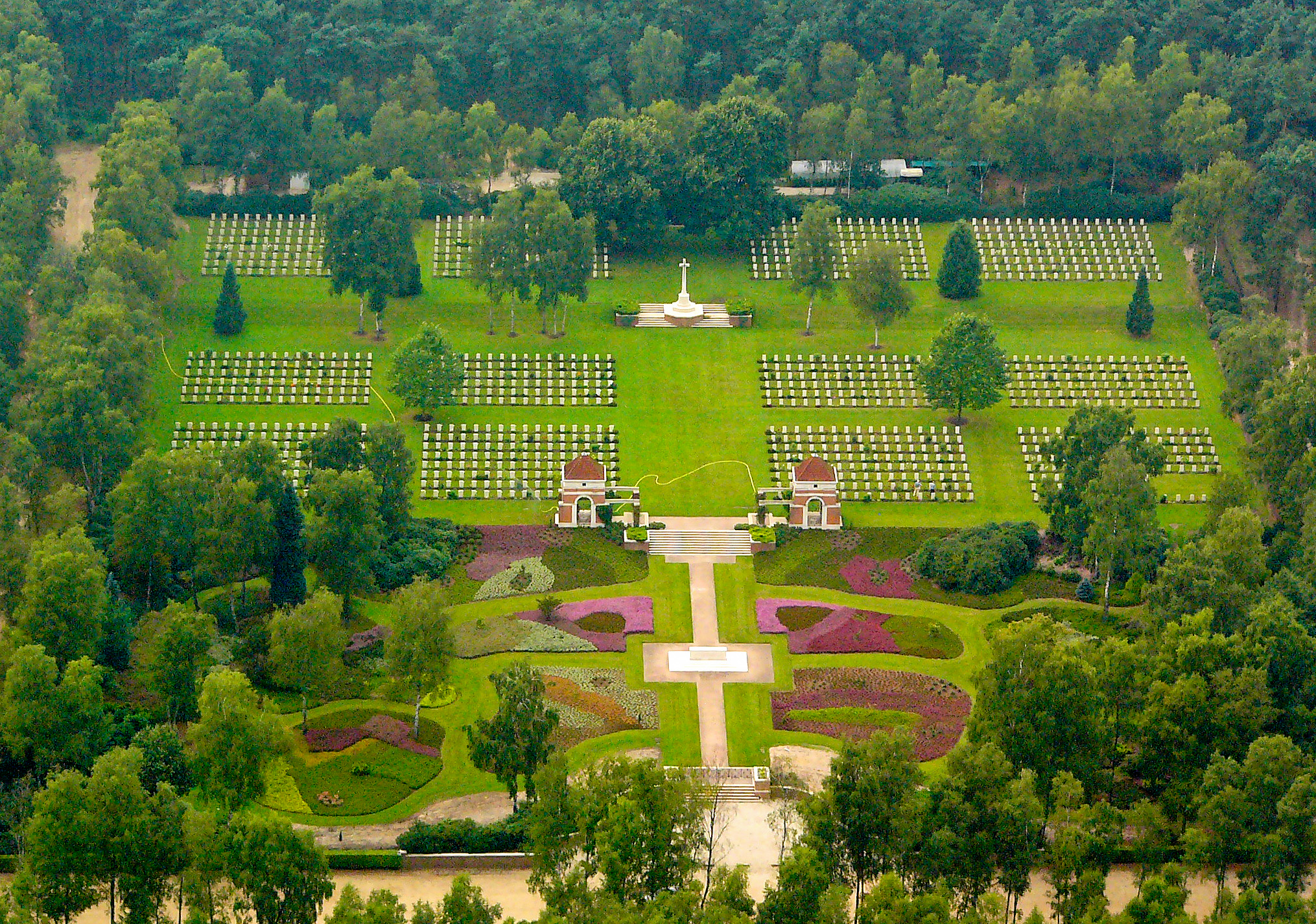
Holten Canadian War Cemetery

Important remembrance sites

- Cemeteries
  - Holten Canadian War Cemetery
- Audiospots: 7

==== Zeeland ====
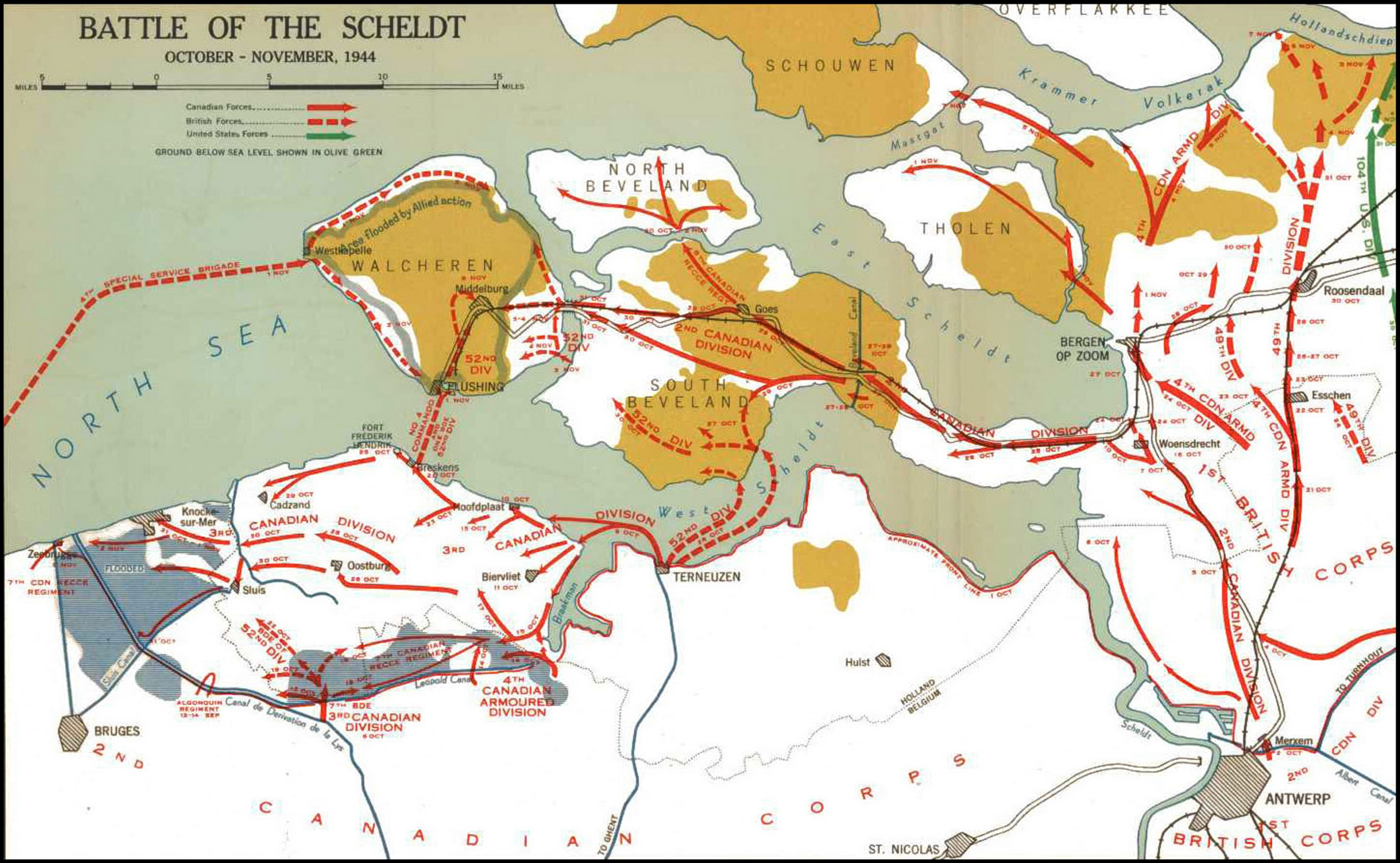
Battle of the Scheldt

Important remembrance sites

- Museums
  - Liberation Museum Zeeland
  - Roertriangle Museum
- Cemeteries
  - Flushing Commonwealth War Cemetery
- Audiospots: 10

==== Limburg ====
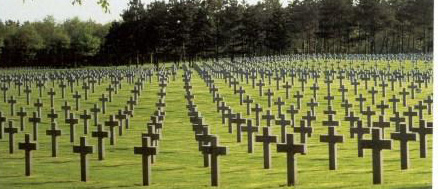
The German Cemetery at Ysselsteyn

Important remembrance sites

- Museums
  - Eyewitness Museum
- Cemeteries
  - Netherlands American Cemetery—Margraten
  - Ysselsteyn German War Cemetery
  - British Military Cemetery Mook
  - Brunssum War Cemetery
  - Nederweert British War Cemetery
- Audiospots: 22

=== Germany ===
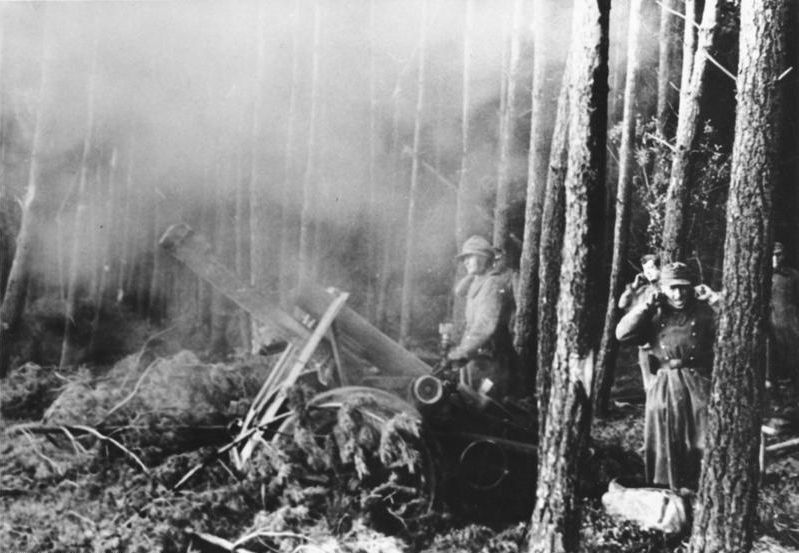
Battle of the Hürtgen forest

==== North Rhine-Westphalia ====
During the autumn and winter of 1944–45, the longest battle of the Second World War on German soil took place in the Hürtgen Forest. With this battle, which ended in an Allied victory, the war returned to Germany and opened the road to Berlin.

Seven 'audiospots' have been installed in the region.

Important remembrance sites

- Museums
  - Museum Hürtgenwald 1944—Vossenack
  - Field Hospital Bunker Simonskall
  - Vogelsang International Place
- Cemeteries
  - Halbe Forest Cemetery
  - Hürtgen War Cemetery
  - Vossenack German Cemetery
  - Reichswald Forest British War Cemetery—Kleve
- Audiospots: 7

==== Berlin ====
Berlin is the endpoint of the route. The Battle of Berlin was one of the last battles of the Second World War in Europe. Many soldiers died in widespread house-to-house fighting where Soviet soldiers faced desperate German resistance. On 2 May 1945, the Berlin garrison surrendered to the Soviet army. The unconditional surrender of Germany was signed on the 8th.

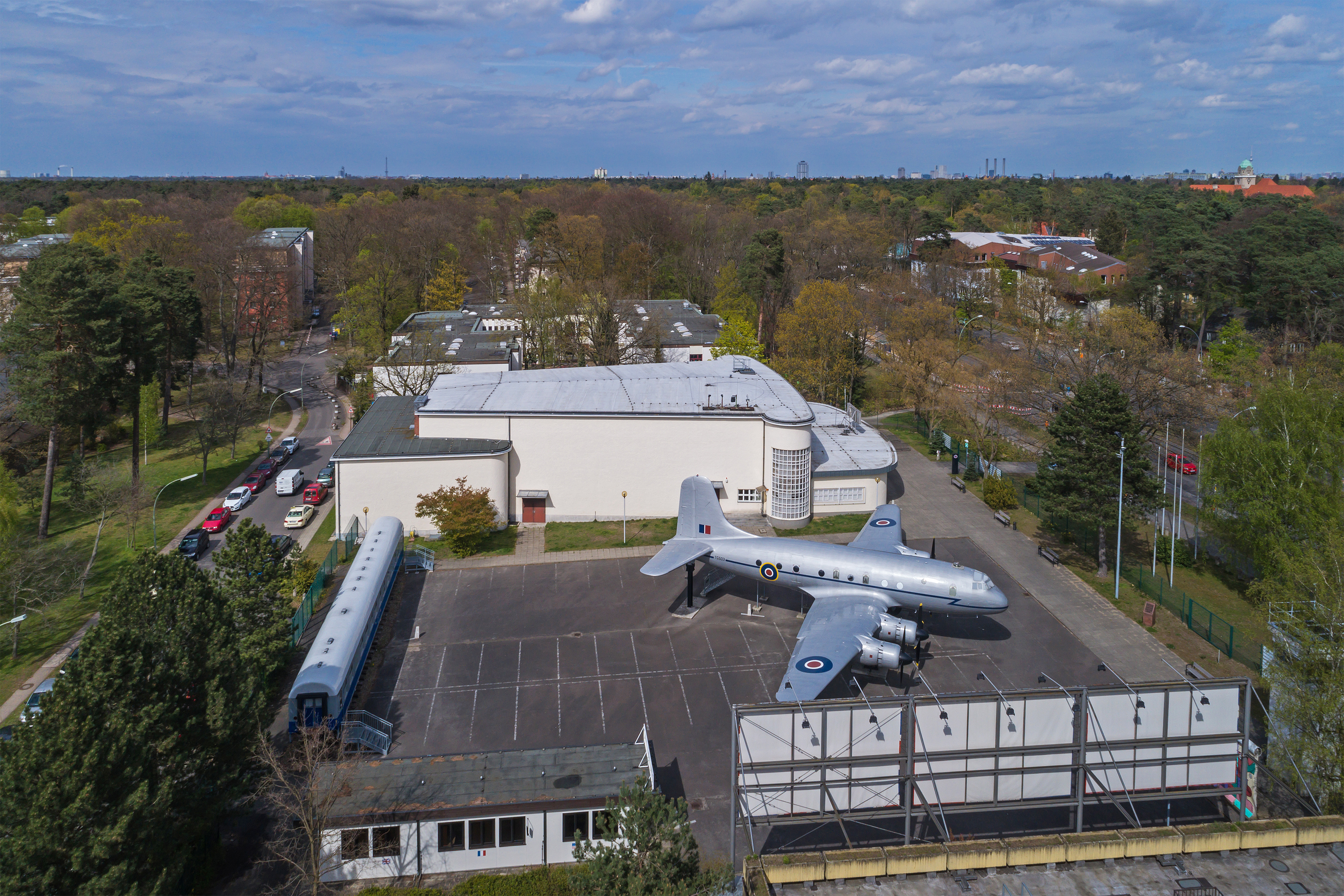
The Allied museum in Berlin

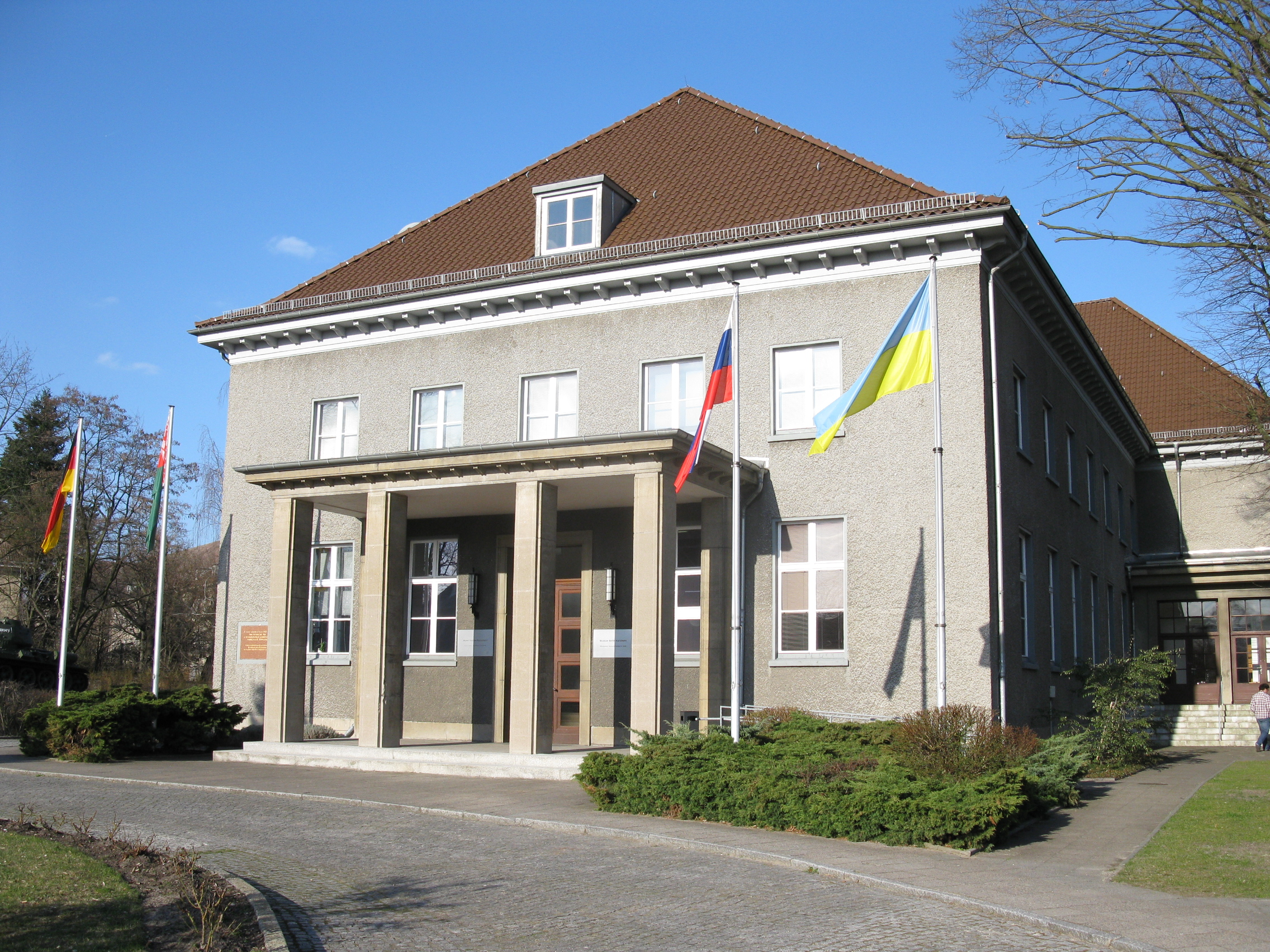
The German/Russian Museum in Karlshorst

Important remembrance sites

- Museums
  - Allied Museum
  - German-Russian Museum
  - Cecilienhof Palace
  - Topography of Terror
- Monuments
  - Kaiser Wilhelm Memorial Church
  - Reichstag
  - Seelow Heights Memorial
  - Soviet War Memorial Tiergarten
  - Soviet War Memorial Treptow Park
  - Friedrichstraße Railway Bunker
  - Memorial for the Murdered Jews of Europe
- Cemeteries
  - Soviet-Russian War Cemetery Simmerath-Rurberg

=== Poland ===
==== Gdańsk ====
On 1 September 1939, the battleship Schleswig-Holstein opened fire on the Westerplatte in Gdańsk. This is regarded as the first shots of the Second World War. After the war, Gdansk would become an important symbol of Polish resistance.

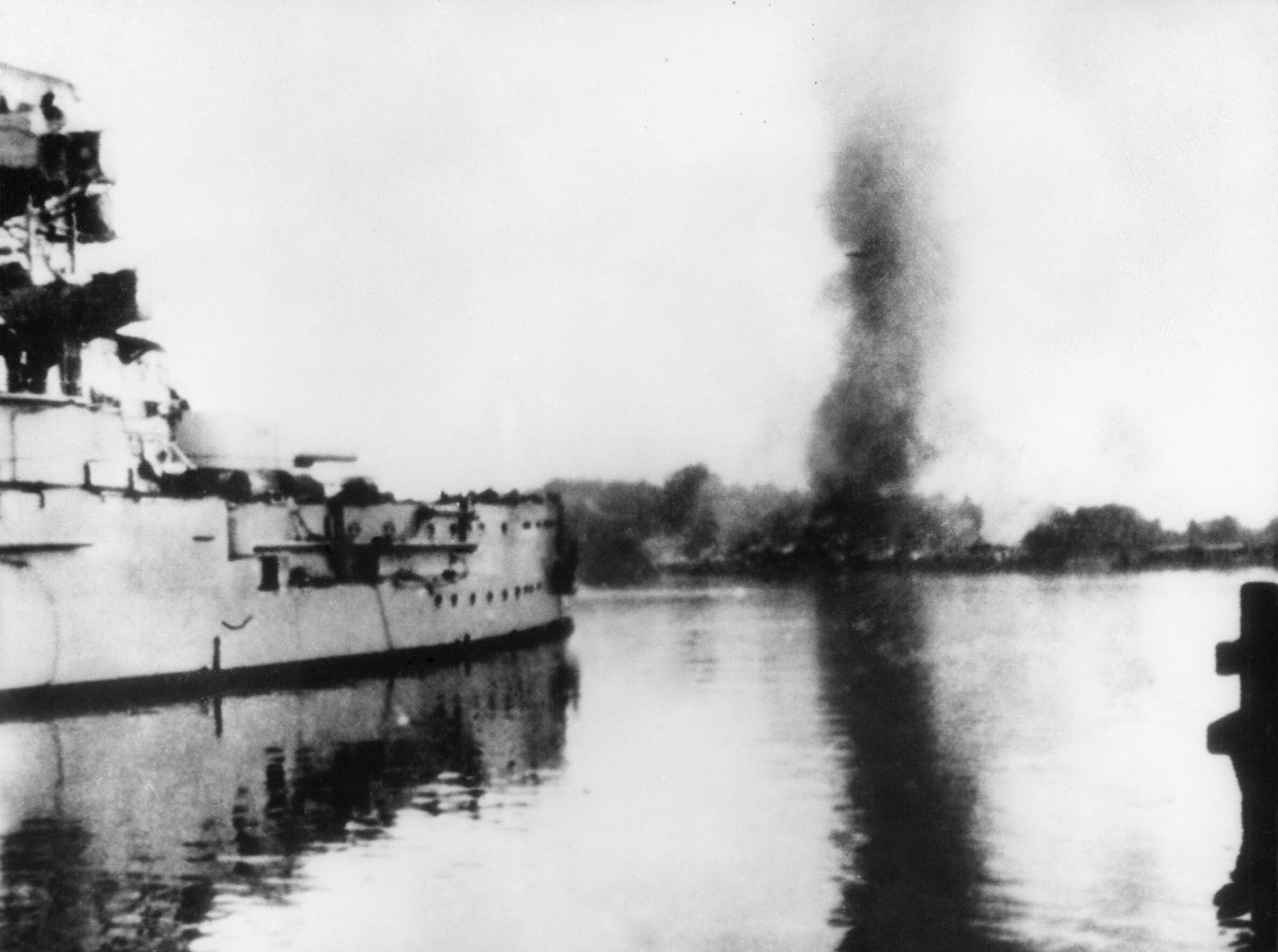
The invasion of Poland

Important remembrance sites

- Museums
  - Polish Post Museum
  - Stutthof Museum
  - European Solidarity Centre
- Monuments
  - Monument of the Coast Defenders
- Cemeteries
  - The Cemetery of the Defenders of Westerplatte

=== Czech Republic ===
==== Plzeň ====
Plzeň is the capital city of the Czech Republic's western region of Bohemia. In May 1945, the US Third Army led by George S. Patton entered Plzeň to liberate the Czech people from six years of occupation by Nazi Germany. The locals remember these events today and they remain immensely grateful to the US Army.

Important remembrance sites

- Patton Memorial Pilsen
  - 16th Armored Division Memorial
  - Thank You America Memorial

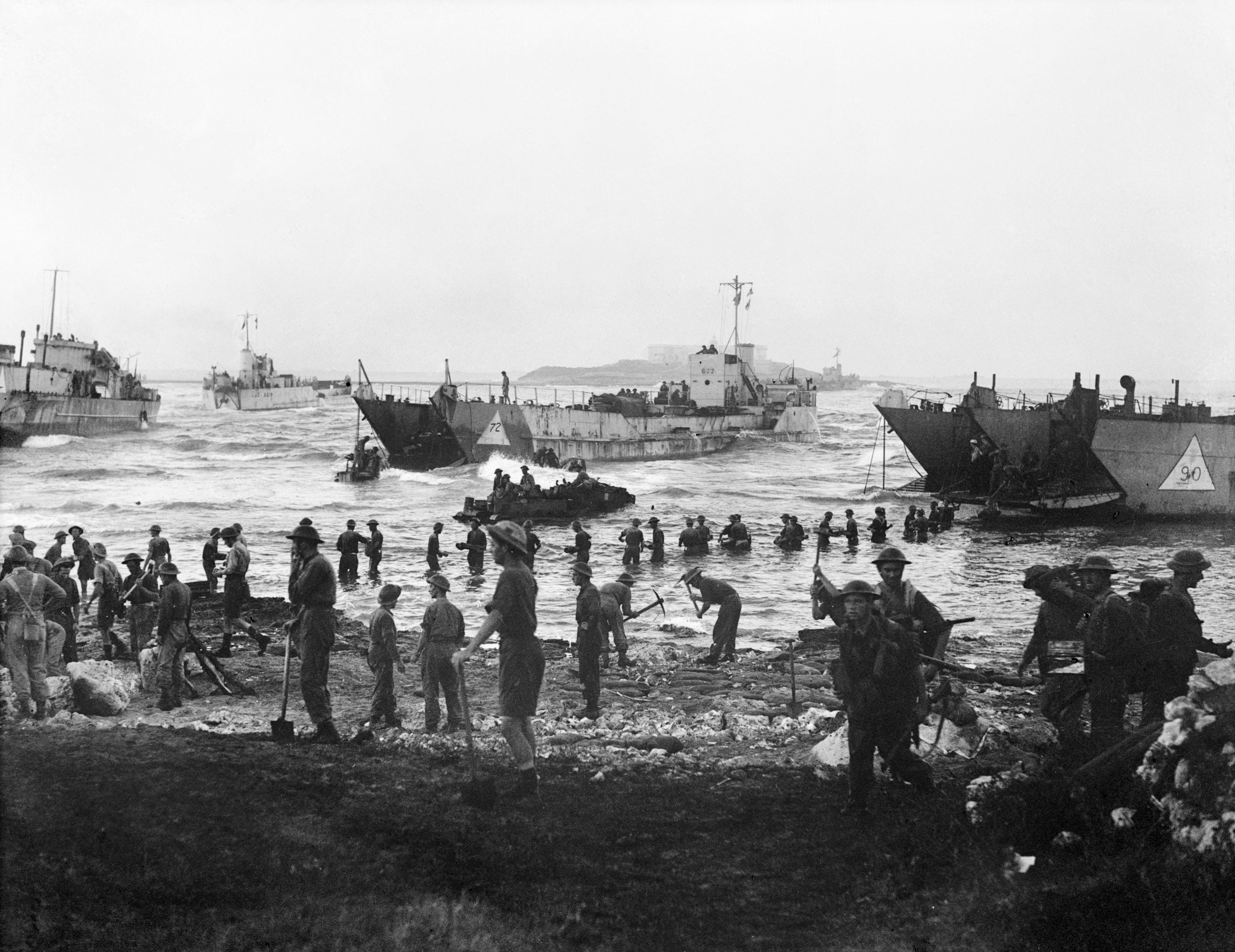
The invasion of Sicily

=== Italy ===
The Liberation Route Europe in Italy connects important remembrance sites connected to the landing in Sicily, the Gustav Line defense, the Battle of Montecassino, the landing in Anzio, the Gothic Line defense.

== The Liberation Route Europe Foundation ==
The Liberation Route Europe is developed and managed by the Liberation Route Europe Foundation with offices in Utrecht and Brussels. Its purpose is to bring together all of the institutions related to World War II—museums, universities, regional and national governments, tourism authorities, veterans associations, war graves commissions and so on.)—and to coordinate their efforts at an international level.

Martin Schulz, former President of the European Parliament, serves as the patron of the Liberation Route Europe Foundation.
