= Silver Ring of Russia =

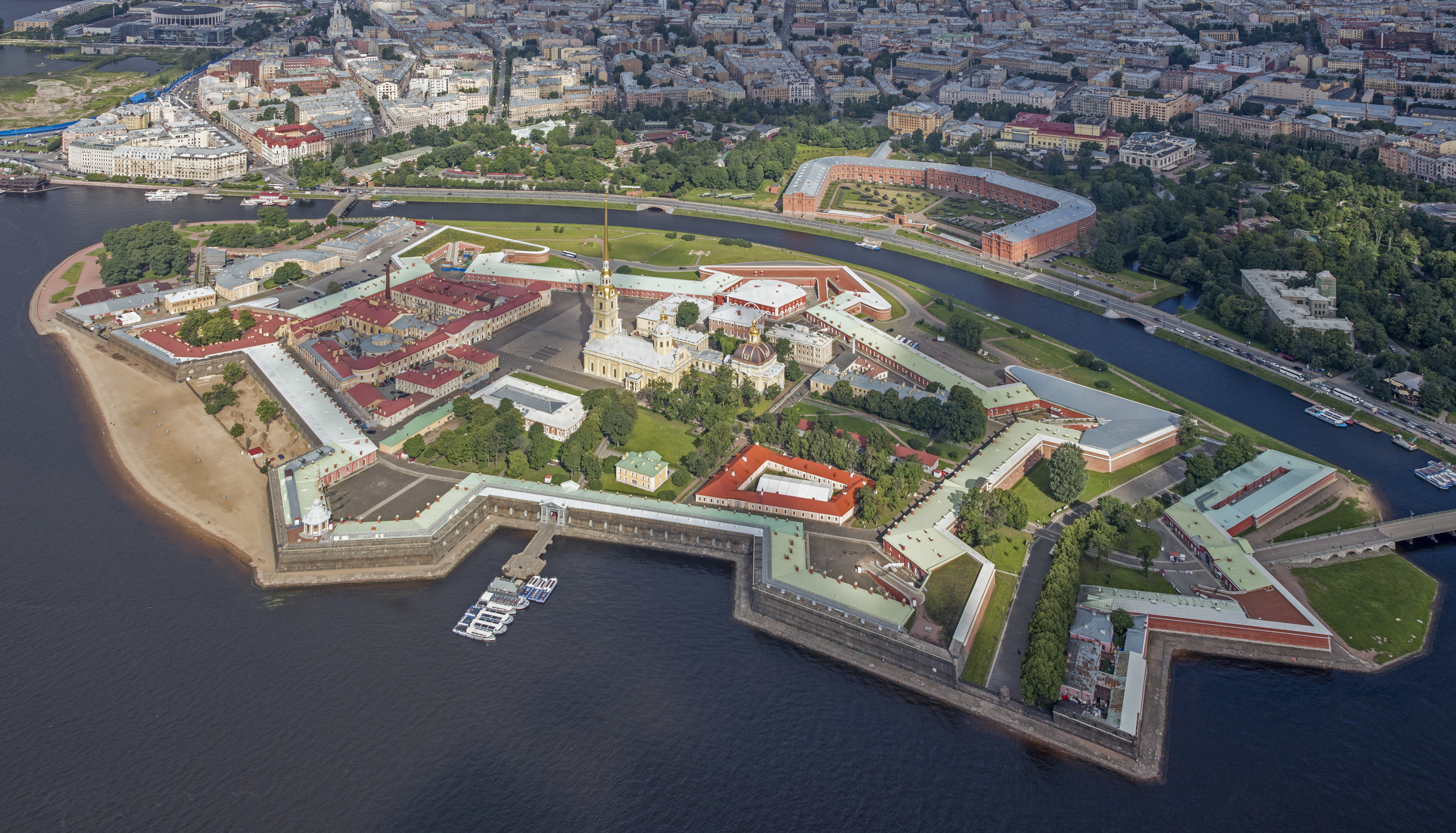
Aerial P&P fortress.jpg

The Silver Ring of Russia (Russian: Серебряное кольцо России) is an interregional tourist project for the creation and maintenance of a complex of routes passing through ancient Russian regions and settlements, in which unique monuments of history and culture of the north-west of Russia have been preserved. Located north of the Golden Ring of Russia. The number and composition of cities and towns on a particular route may vary.
