= European Institute of Cultural Routes =

Cultural heritage of Europe

- Headquarters: Abbaye de Neumünster, Luxembourg
- President: André Biever
- Website: http://www.coe.int/routes

The European Institute of Cultural Routes is a non-profit association based in Luxembourg whose aim is to help the Council of Europe, as a technical body, in the establishment of European Cultural Routes.

It was established in 1998 and its role is:

- to examine applications for new projects;
- to monitor activities in the field and co-ordinate the work of partner organizations;
- to disseminate and archive information documents.

The Council of Europe:

entrusted the Institute to follow up the already elected routes, to co-ordinate and provide technical aid to networks, in particular in their development in Central and Eastern Europe, to initiate new proposals as well as to disseminate information and set up a database that will constitute the memory of the programme of the cultural routes.

The European Institute of Cultural Routes

The European Institute of Cultural Routes (EICR) was established as a European public service and technical body as part of a political agreement between the Council of Europe and the Grand Duchy of Luxembourg (Ministry of Culture, Further Education and Research). Since 1988 the Institute has worked in close collaboration with the Council of Europe in carrying out its responsibilities, namely to ensure the continuity and development of the programme of the Cultural Routes in the 51 signatory countries of the European Cultural Convention and, depending on the geographical and historical requirements of the themes, in those countries which have had and continue to have close relations with Europe.

The EICR resides in the Centre Culturel de Rencontre – Abbaye de Neumünster, in Luxembourg. It retains all relevant documentation and maintains a specialist library on the routes. The Institute regularly welcomes those in charge of the networks of the routes as well as project managers, researchers, students and members of the general public. The EICR is also charged with participating in European training, research and analysis programmes concerning cultural tourism, for the European Commission and various governments and project managers. The Institute organises themed symposiums and specialist training, collaborates in the setting up and running of the Routes, and participates in specialist exhibitions while promoting a greater awareness of the links between culture, tourism and the environment.

From 2004 to 2006 the Institute managed the visibility and communication work of the European research programme PICTURE (Proactive management of the impact of cultural tourism on urban resources and economies).

In 2008 the European Commission (Directorate-General Education and Culture) named the EICR as a body active on a European level in the field of Culture, in recognition for its essential role in creating a coherent programme of sustainable cultural tourism initiatives promoting the "Destination Europe" and encouraging Europeans to discover their common roots and history through travel and the exploration of material and immaterial heritage.

The Institute is a member of NECSTOUR, an association of European regions working to develop competitive and sustainable tourism, and has signed an agreement with the Cité de la Culture et du Tourisme durable to provide distance-learning and to study the sustainability of introducing tourism to the cultural routes. The Institute is currently working with the Council of Europe and the Tourism Unit of the European Commission on a study into the impact of the cultural routes on small and medium businesses.

In 2011 the Institute welcome a Partial Agreement aimed at combining the voluntary contributions of those member countries of the Council of Europe who wish to increase the funds available to the cultural routes.

Since the opening up of Europe to the East, the Cultural Routes have enabled, and continue to enable (particularly by expanding to include the Southern Caucasus), the creation of a real dialogue between Eastern and Western Europeans. The opening of a resource centre for the Cultural Routes in Sibiu, in the Casa Luxembourg, in liaison with the European Institute of Cultural Routes in Luxembourg and the Mioritics Association is testament to this.

Stefano Dominioni is the current Director of the Institute and Executive Secretary of the Enlarged Partial Agreement on Cultural Routes of the Council of Europe. Michel Thomas-Penette and Penelope Denu directed the Institute from 1998 to 2011 and from 2011 to 2015 respectively.

Christian Biever is President of the Institute since 2018. He replaced Robert Philippart, Colette Flesch, Erna Hennicot-Schoepges and Guy Dockendorf.

== See also ==
- European Cultural Route
- Cultural policies of the European Union
