= Cultural Route of the Council of Europe =

European certification

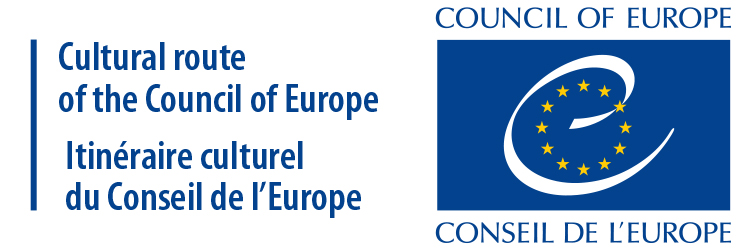

A Culture Route of the Council of Europe, sometimes referred to as a European Cultural Route, is a certification awarded by the Council of Europe to networks promoting the European shared culture, history and memory. These routes must also match some fundamental values promoted by the Council of Europe such as democracy, human rights and intercultural exchanges in the framework of cultural tourism.

A Cultural Route of the Council of Europe is not necessarily a physical path to be walked through and can be made up of cultural stakeholders such as museums, municipalities or local governments clustered into one umbrella association. Being awarded the title Cultural Route of the Council of Europe opens the way to a larger visibility, network of cultural stakeholders or even funding. The programme was launched by the Council of Europe and not the European Union, even though it contributes to it. As a result, the programme goes beyond the borders of the EU, and even Europe in general - as some Routes go as far as North Africa or the Middle East.

The programme was launched by the Council of Europe in 1987. It is based since 1998 in Luxembourg, at the European Institute of Cultural Routes (EICR). Since 2010, the evaluation and certification-awarding process is managed by the Enlarged Partial Agreement on Cultural Routes (EPA).

In 2022, 48 Cultural Routes were certified as listed below.

== History ==
The Cultural Routes of the Council of Europe are tools of the European cultural cooperation implemented by the Council of Europe with the "European cultural convention" in 1954.

On 23 October 1987, the Santiago de Compostela Declaration established the Santiago De Compostela Pilgrim Routes, the first European Cultural Route. From this point on, the Council of Europe gradually implemented a certification of routes with a cultural, social or historical interest with a view to bringing European cultures and peoples closer. The certification criteria have been revised throughout the existence of the programme, the last time was in December 2013.

The European Institute of Cultural Routes (EICR) was set up in 1998 following a political agreement between the Council of Europe and the Government of Luxembourg. The EICR have been in charge of managing the Cultural Route programme since then, ensuring connexions between the Routes’ associations, its university network, the Council of Europe and since 2010 the EPA statutory bodies. As a result, the institute organises several annual meetings between the programme's stakeholders, helps with the certification of new Cultural Routes, evaluates every three years the certified Routes or promotes the Cultural Routes.

In December 2010, the Committee of Ministers of the Council of Europe adopted a resolution establishing the Enlarged Partial Agreement on Cultural Routes (EPA). This agreement aimed to making the programme's funding and organisation easier. The EPA is based in the EICR and periodically gathers representatives of some of the states that are the more interested in the programme who are empowered to certify new Cultural Routes as well as evaluating already-certified Routes.

== List of the routes ==
This is a list of the Cultural Routes of the Council of Europe, in order of their date of certification:

1. The Santiago De Compostela Pilgrim Routes (1987)
2. The Hansa (1991)
3. The Viking Routes (1993)
4. The Via Francigena (1994)
5. The Routes of El legado andalusí (1997)
6. European Mozart Ways (2002)
7. The Phoenicians’ Route (2003)
8. The Pyrenean Iron Route (2004)
9. The Saint Martin of Tours Route (2005)
10. The Cluniac Sites in Europe (2005)
11. The Routes of the Olive Tree (2005)
12. The Via Regia (2005)
13. TRANSROMANICA (2007)
14. The Iter Vitis Route (2009)
15. The European Route of Cistercian Abbeys (2010)
16. The European Cemeteries Route (2010)
17. Prehistoric Rock Art Trails (2010)
18. European Route of Historic Thermal Towns (2010)
19. The Route of Saint Olav Ways (2010)
20. The European Route of Jewish Heritage (2004)
21. The European Route of Ceramics (2012)
22. The European Route of Megalithic Culture (2013)
23. The Huguenot and Waldensian trail (2013)
24. ATRIUM - Architecture of Totalitarian Regimes of the 20th Century in Europe's Urban Memory (2014)
25. The Réseau Art Nouveau Network (2014)
26. Via Habsburg (2014)
27. The Roman Emperors and Danube Wine Route (2015)
28. In the Footsteps of Robert Louis Stevenson (2015)
29. Destination Napoleon (2015)
30. The European routes of emperor Charles V (2015)
31. Route of the fortified towns of the Greater Region (2016)
32. Impressionisms Route (2018)
33. Via Charlemagne (2018)
34. Liberation Route Europe (2019)
35. European Route of Industrial Heritage (2019)
36. Le Corbusier Destinations: Architectural Promenades (2019)
37. Iron Curtain Trail (2019)
38. Routes of Reformation (2019)
39. European Route of Historic Gardens (2020)
40. Via Romea Germanica (2020)
41. Aenas Route (2021)
42. Alvar Aalto Route (2021)
43. Cyril and Methodius Route (2021)
44. European Route d'Artagnan (2021)
45. Iron Age Danube Route (2021)
46. Historic Cafés Route (2022)
47. European Fairy Tale Route (2022)
48. Women Writers Route (2022)

== See also ==
- European Institute of Cultural Routes
- Cultural policies of the European Union
