= Great West Way =

British geographical feature

The Great West Way is a touring route which runs between the UK capital of London to the city of Bristol. It was launched in 2018 and is a multi-modal touring route. It is designed to be travelled in a variety of different ways: by road, by rail, on water via the Kennet and Avon Canal and River Thames, by bike or on foot. The Great West Way includes the Kennet and Avon Canal, the Great Western Railway and the A4.

It can be accessed by air from Heathrow Airport in the east and Bristol Airport in the west.

== Route ==
The Great West Way runs between Bristol in the west and western London in the east, passing through the counties of Somerset, Gloucestershire, Wiltshire and Berkshire en route and dipping into the southern parts of Oxfordshire and Buckinghamshire as it approaches the capital.

Coming from Bristol, the first major stop is Bath, Somerset. Stretching northeast of Bath and into Wiltshire and Gloucestershire is the Cotswolds.

East of the Cotswolds the route traverses Wiltshire, a large county that is home to the prehistoric sites of Stonehenge and Avebury, the historic market towns of Corsham and Marlborough, the village of Lacock and a large chunk of another Area of Outstanding Natural Beauty, the North Wessex Downs.

From Wiltshire, travelling east toward London, the route continues through Berkshire, the home of Windsor Castle and the twins of Reading, Hungerford and Newbury. The North Wessex Downs give way to the Chilterns Hills.

Finally, the Great West Way follows road, rail, water, walking and cycling routes into London, where the main calling points include Richmond Park and Kew Gardens.

== Attractions along the Great West Way ==
The Great West Way route includes a number of heritage sites of national and international importance including:

- Windsor Castle
- Royal Ascot
- Cotswolds AONB
- Stonehenge and Avebury World Heritage Site
- Westonbirt, The National Arboretum
- Bath World Heritage Site
- SS Great Britain

== History ==
The Great West Way was developed with the support of the UK Government’s £40 million Discover England Fund, which was announced in 2015 as a way of boosting inbound UK tourism. This fund is administered by VisitEngland (England’s official tourist board). The Great West Way project won funding of £1 million in 2017.

The Great West Way is supported by 270 Great West Way Ambassadors; businesses and destinations investing as partners in the project.
