= Vocational qualification transfer system =

The Professional Qualification Transfer System (PQTS) model is a proposal for a structured description of work-related competences. The core elements are the Competence Matrix and the Competence Profiles. A Competence Matrix displays competences structurally in a table according to core work tasks in a specific occupational field (“competence area”) and the progress of competence development (“step of competence development”). Competence Profiles are formed from individual parts of this Competence Matrix. In the context of ECVET the VQTS project sought to support the transnational mobility of learners. A Competence Matrix can be used for the development of qualifications, training programmes, and job profiles, as well as for human resource planning, the allocation of qualifications to the Qualifications Framework, and for developing higher permeability between professional education and higher education.

== Goals ==
The main goal of the VQTS model is the development of a systematic process for the comparison of competences and qualifications, and for the transnational transfer of competences acquired abroad (for example between education and working environment, or between professional and higher education).

== Structure ==
=== Competence matrix ===
Chart 1: Competence Matrix Mechatronics

Chart 2: Competence Matrix Electronics

A Competence Matrix displays competences in a table according to core work tasks and the progress of competence development. Competence areas and steps of competence development are described in the table.

- The left hand column of the table contains competence areas, based on the various core work tasks.
- The acquisitions of competences, from beginner level to “skilled worker” level, are described for each competence area. Each competence described is a “step of competence development”.

The structure and different ranges of Competence Matrices can be shown by these examples:

- Competence Matrix “mechatronics (chart 1)“: Developed in VQTS I, this Matrix focuses on the development of competences required from workers at beginner level to skilled worker level.
- Competence Matrix for “electronics/electrical engineering” (chart 2): The VQTS II project intended to develop a Competence Matrix to be used to identify areas of overlap between professional education and higher education programmes. Therefore, the scope of the Competence Matrix ‘electronics/electrical engineering’ had to be broadened to include at least some steps of competence development relevant to HE.

A Competence Matrix can be developed via a moderated workshop using experts from the respective areas. Within the VQTS model it is assumed that 5-25 competence areas will be defined per occupational field, and 2-6 steps of the competence development process described for each competence area. It is not easy to describe competences, because they depend on a variety of characteristics and may be localised in different manners. There are no specific determinants for differentiating the steps in the model. Several dimensions could be:

Ability to

- perform independent work tasks
- deal with a certain complexity
- deal with quality standard demands
- deal with dynamic situations
- deal with non-transparency.

Competences in this model refer to cognitive competences (knowledge), functional competences (skills) as well as social competences (behaviour).

=== Competence profiles ===
Competence Profiles are formed from particular parts of a Competence Matrix by identifying competences that are relevant to a certain training programme or qualification (organisational profile) or are reflective the competences acquired so far by a person in training (individual profile). Organisational profiles, developed by the authorities responsible for the respective training programmes or qualification, indicate the relevant competences of the specific training programme or qualification on the Competence Matrix and the corresponding number of Credit Points. Individual profiles, developed by the responsible training provider, assess which stage of competence development and Credit Points the student or apprentice has reached so far. Based on the competence profile of the person in training a Competence Profile Certificate can be issued.

== Applications ==
A Competence Matrix can be used for those purposes where the transparency of competence profiles is very important, such as:

- transferring professional competences acquired abroad (mobility);
- transferring and recognising competences acquired within the official VET system as well as competences achieved through non-formal or informal learning;
- developing qualifications (for use in the development of the EQF);
- composing job profiles as well as personnel (human resources) planning;
- referencing qualifications to qualifications frameworks;
- enhancing permeability between VET and HE.

== Background ==
=== Projects ===
The VQTS models were coordinated by 3s under the “Leonardo da Vinci Programme":

- VQTS I (2003–2006) with partners from Austria, Czech Republic, Denmark, Germany, Hungary, Italy, the Netherlands and the United Kingdom
- VQTS II (2007–2009) with partners from Austria, Czech Republic, Germany, Malta, the Netherlands and Slovenia

=== Context of educational policy ===
The VQTS project was closely aligned with the aims of the Copenhagen Process wherein the EU countries declared their willingness to foster employability and lifelong learning in Europe by strengthening cooperation and increasing mobility in professional education. According to the ‘Copenhagen Process’, it should be possible to utilise competences acquired through formal, non-formal and informal learning throughout Europe. The VQTS model is one of the best instruments to implement ECVET and increase the (international) transparency and comparability of qualifications and training offers.

== Awards ==
The VQTS I project received the Helsinki Award 2006 in the "Recognition of competences and qualifications, ECVET" category, and the gold Lifelong Learning Award 2007 for its contributions to the aims of the ‘Copenhagen Process’. The VQTS II project received the "Best Projects 2007" label in ADAM, the project and product portal for Leonardo da Vinci. These projects have strongly contributed to improvements in professional education and training in Europe in recent years.

== See also ==
- DISCO - European Dictionary of Skills and Competences
