= Water Competences Model =

WACOM
- WAter COmpetences Model
- Keywords: EQF, Sewage Treatment, Water Sector, competences
- Project type: European Research Consortium Project (Lifelong Learning Programme of the European Commission)
- Funding agency: European Commission
- Framework programme: Lifelong Learning Programme
- Reference: DE/09/LLP-LdV/TOI/147230
- Objective: Competence Modelling in the Water Sector
- Project coordinator: Christian M. Stracke
- Participants: University of Duisburg-Essen; German Association for Water, Waste Water and Waste (DWA); Technological Educational Institute of Athens (TEI); Technical University of Civil Engineering Bucharest; Agro-Know Technologies; Romanian Regional Training Centre for the Local Public Administration; VITUKI Environmental Protection and Water Management Research Centre
- Budget: Total: 380,000 Euro
- Duration: October 2009 – September 2011
- Website: www.wacom-project.eu

The Water Competences Model (WACOM) was an international project undertaken through the European Union's Lifelong Learning Programme, specifically the Leonardo da Vinci programme. It primarily deals with initial and continuing vocational education and training (VET) in the European Union. This model was established through the EQF in combination with the German Reference Model for Competence Modeling PAS 1093.

== Overview ==
Due to the shortage of the precious resource water and the consequences of climate change, numerous European policies have been developed and adopted for the protection and sustainable utilisation of water, creating a huge demand in vocational training. Economic factors like privatisation and increasing cost pressure in water management are further increasing these educational needs, leading to the demand for VET opportunities and products that are as short and tailor‐made as possible. The situation of vocational training in water management was addressed by the WACOM instrument, which attempted to define the needed competences and qualifications for the different tasks, working places and employees within the water sector. In this way, WACOM strove to lead to a supposed increase in the volume of mobility throughout Europe as well as to a higher transparency and recognition of qualifications and competences. The project aimed at creating general as well as particular modular VET opportunities and products in the water management concerning the addressed competences and qualifications. Through this, the VET opportunities and products were able to be related and mapped to those competences and qualifications for the management of sewage treatment plants.

In addition, the competence and qualification model offers the basis for the individual identification of missing competences and qualifications, i.e. of clearly limited VET needs. WACOM also supported the European comparability and recognition of vocational training through the combination with credit points (ECVET) and thus mobility. Next to numerous dissemination activities, WACOM looked in particular for input into the national VET systems and for launching a European Norm initiative as contribution to the European standardisation (CEN). Furthermore, the transfer into other sectors and all European countries was carried out through a focus on pilot‐testing, optimization, dissemination, exploitation and sustainable strategies.

== Main objectives ==
The overall objective of WACOM was the development and transfer of a reference model for competence modelling into the water sector of the partner countries, enabling the identification of the VET needs by the employees and learners of required competences and qualifications at specific working places as well as of the improvement of transparency and comparability of VET opportunities and products.

- To support participants in training and further training activities in the acquisition and the use of knowledge, skills and qualifications to facilitate personal development
- To support improvements in quality and innovation in vocational education and training systems, institutions and practices
- To enhance the attractiveness of vocational education and training and mobility for employers and individuals and to facilitate the mobility of working trainees

== Products ==
The development of the WACOM instrument was supported by the transfer of the competence and qualification model into the water sector and by the adaptation for the selected topic management of sewage treatment plants. WACOM influences vocational training in water management and in additional sectors.

The main WACOM products and affects were:

1. "Competence model for the water sector"- Development of WACOM (the WAter COmpetences Model) as the establishment of a competence model for the water sector based on EQF and PAS 1093: the aim was the foundation of the vocational training on the principle of competence modelling based on the identification of the specific demands and needs of the water management and existing practice concerning competence models in the water sector. The experiences gained through the testing of this model aid the plans of other European research projects which also use competence models, such as the Agricom Project or the Compat.egov Project.
2. "WACOM instrument" - Optimization and adaptation of WACOM (the WAter COmpetences Model) to the vocational education and training systems and cultures in Europe. Finally the WACOM instrument was used for the description of the competences and qualifications and for the improvement of their transparency and comparability.

== End-of-project conferences ==
Two conferences were carried out in order to open the results of the WACOM project for discussion to a larger audience, the 4th European Conference "Innovations in the Environmental Sector" (INES) and the European Conference "Competence Modelling for the Water Sector", both of which took place in Brussels, Belgium on 21 September 2011.

== See also ==
- eCOTOOL
