= Central European Training Centre for Brokers =

The Central European Training Centre for Brokers (or Brókerképző in Hungarian) was founded on 31 July 1991 by the Broker Association, the Budapest Stock Exchange, the Hungarian Association of Securities Dealers, the International Training Center for Bankers and the Hungarian Financial Supervisory Authority. The foundation was established with the aim to promote the financial education of young people in Hungary, thus facilitating the creation of a group of qualified stock exchange and securities trading professionals. Key objectives include the conducting of educational and awareness-raising activities, and the raising of the standards of the Hungarian securities markets and stock market activity. The foundation's educational and public awareness activities are primarily aimed at young people's awareness of financial matters on the one hand, and at training a group of securities professionals for the purpose of developing a strong knowledge of the securities market.

The foundation regularly invites foreign professionals, experts and lecturers for professional training, which they also support financially, helps make and assists in educational radio and television programs, and also helps and assists in the educational program of high schools in teaching skills in securities trading and knowledge related to finance. The foundation also endeavors to meet and fulfil the educational requirements of Eastern and Central European countries.

The foundation also carries out scientific activities and research studies for educational purposes, prepares, publishes and distributes brochures and publications, promotes the purchasing of books and magazines, and last but not least organizes and conducts conferences.

== Objectives of the KEBA Challenge ==
The foundation is basically known for its annual KEBA Student Investor Challenge for high school students, which aims to promote awareness of the stock market and general knowledge of financial concepts among young students. Numerous professional awards are assigned during the competition, and the most successful competitors are also awarded with prizes such as professional book packages, internships with various brokerage firms and participation in training courses.
