= IQR (disambiguation) =

IQR is an initialism for Interquartile range, a measure of statistical dispersion.

IQR may also refer to:

- iQR code, an alternative to existing QR codes developed by Denso Wave
- The Integrated Qualifications Register, a public register of worker qualifications awarded in Poland
- Information Quality Ratio, a normalized variant of the mutual information
