= EQF =

EQF may refer to:

- European Qualifications Framework, a translation device to make national qualifications more readable across Europe
- Equifax, a consumer credit reporting agency in the United States
