= KEBA Student Investor Challenge =

The KEBA Student Investor Challenge (in Hungarian: KEBA Tőzsdeverseny) is a national, academic competition that provides high school students (grades 9-12) with an insider's view of the global capital markets. Sponsors of the competition include prominent financial institutions in Hungary such as Budapest Stock Exchange, Equilor Investments Ltd., Hungarian subsidiary of X-Trade Brokers DM SA, Concorde Securities, Central Clearing House and Depository of Hungary and International Training Center for Bankers. KEBA Student Investor Challenge was first held in 1999 and since then it is held annually by Central European Training Centre for Brokers in association with the Hungarian subsidiary of Erste Group.

KEBA Student Investor Challenge qualification round takes place over three months in which each team, consisting of three students, receive a virtual capital of $50,000 to trade with stocks, commodities, currency pairs, and futures aiming to achieve as high returns as possible; in addition teams complete several quizzes and they also take part in a two-course interactive simulation produced by ALEAS Simulations, Inc. in which students gain knowledge related to basic concepts in online trading, economics, and finance. 25 teams with the highest scores at the end of the round advance to the semi-finals.

In the semi-finals teams write a 5-10 pages long essay on their trading endeavors evaluating the positions they took, their experience, and the knowledge they gained throughout the competition; and complete one, significantly more difficult multiple choice test. The best performing five teams qualify for the finals at International Business School in Budapest.

== Finals ==
The finals begin with each team presenting their essays, analysing the trades they executed during the trading game. Following the presentation judges question each team about their presentation and their knowledge of macroeconomic theory. After a lunch break finals end with each team role-playing consultants: each team is randomly given a certain kind of portfolio which they have to assess and then, through an active discussion, give investment advice to the judges role-playing the investors. Judges consist of senior equity research analysts and managing directors of the sponsoring firms. Prizes include summer internships at the sponsoring firms and trading courses offered by ITCB. The Hungarian media also films at the finals.
