= Operative Professional =

The Operative Professional is a public law higher professional qualification in the German education system and forms the second career level of the IHK professional qualification track, it is meant to be an alternative to an academic bachelor. This advanced training prepares the trainee for accountability of middle management and so the Operative Professional has extended know-how and responsibility.

== Position in the European Qualifications Framework ==
Within the European Qualifications Framework the Operative Professional lies at Level 6. Unlike a real bachelor degree, it is not part of the academic qualification track, but the professional qualification track and thus does not qualify the holder for masters studies. It does, however, enable access to bachelor studies at a technical college or university.

Level 6	Advanced knowledge of a field of work or study, involving a critical understanding of theories and principles	advanced skills, demonstrating mastery and innovation, required to solve complex and unpredictable problems in a specialised field of work or study	manage complex technical or professional activities or projects, taking responsibility for decision-making in unpredictable work or study contexts; take responsibility for managing professional development of individuals and groups	Honours Bachelor Degree, Bachelor Degree without Honours, Graduate Certificate, Graduate Diploma, vocational university German State-certified Engineer, Business Manager and Designer (Fachhochschule) Bachelor, City and Guilds Graduateship (GCGI), German Fachwirt, German Operative Professional

== Certifications ==
=== Certified IT Systems Manager ===
They design technically optimised IT solutions in line with the market. They plan, manage and monitor IT development projects and take part in the leadership of employees.

=== Certified IT Business Manager ===
They lead independently and self-dependent IT projects. They are responsible for specific aims like chronological, financial, and human resources. They take part in the leadership of employees.

=== Certified IT Business Consultant ===
They advise companies in questions of analysis, definition of aims, development and implementation of IT concepts. They consolidate the company by finding potential for development, helping to be competitive and expanding business opportunities. They also take part in the leadership of employees.

=== Certified IT Marketing Manager ===
They supply technically optimised market-conform IT solutions, lead the marketing and purchasing of IT products and IT services. They support the company decisions with strategic information in trading and economic terms. They take part in the leadership of employees.

== Admission requirements ==
For the further education “Operative Professional” you need the following requirements (§2 IT-RVO).

- Apprenticeship in an IT-profession with 1 year of work experience and a qualification as an IT-specialist or
- Apprenticeship in another career with 2 year IT work experience and a qualification as an IT-specialist or
- 5 year IT work experience and qualification as an IT-specialist

The qualification of IT-specialists is separated into 14 profiles. You find these profiles in the IT-Fortbildungsverordnung.

The qualification “certified specialist” can be verified by:

- a certification from the IHK or
- a certificate from a certification institute for personnel (DIN EN ISO/IEC 17024) or
- a certificate of training with the IT-specialist content or
- an employment reference which proves the IT-skills in broadness like the IT-specialist qualification.

Dissident from this can be admitted who substantiates the skills with other certifications which authorise to participate in the exam.

== Procedure of civil training ==
There are a range of training academies nationally which provide the training. There are different types of training models, from weekend schooling to full-time training systems.

== Procedure of the training in the Bundeswehr ==
The qualification as an Operative Professional provides the soldiers with the necessary skills to manage all operational tasks optimally. This education is the basis for returning to civil life and it offers necessary job prospects.

The soldiers have the choice between different training places which provide the training as an Operative Professional.

The places in Germany are: Munich, Bad Frankenhausen, Veitshöchheim, Schwerin, Regensburg, Hof, Karlsruhe, Berlin, Mölln (Hamburg), Leipzig, Mainz, Hanover und Hilden.

== Trainings procedure overview ==
A	Learning style and method of working	10 h
B	Leadership and human resources	220 h
C	Operational IT-processes	360 h
D	Preparation project	100 h
overall		690 h

- Phase I: core skills, ca. 10 weeks
- Phase IIa: Internship, ca. 13 weeks interrupted by exam preparation and oral examination
- Phase IIb: Exam preparation and exam Practical demonstration ca. 3 weeks
- Phase III: Profile-Specific IT professional training ca. 12 weeks, at the end refers to written interim examination held for the professional qualification
- PhaseIV: Final phase of the internship, ca. 13 weeks

Preparation of documentation
Submission of documentation
Preparation of project presentation

- Phase V: Exam preparation and oral examination

== Exam, procedure and content ==
The IHK is a local organization of businesses whose goal is to further the interests of businesses. The IHK is responsible for the Operative Professional exam.

The IHK-Exam subdivides into the following topics:

- ØLeadership of employees and human resources management,
- operational IT-processes and
- specific IT- expert tasks

=== Leadership of employees and human resources management ===
Here we have two activity-oriented, integrated situation tasks (90 min. per task, together max. 240 min). The second part is a practical demonstration (max. 30 min. and 20 min. preparation time). The potential topics are:

- prepare and perform a hiring interview or
- prepare and perform an appraisal interview or
- prepare and perform a trainings phase or
- prepare and perform a personnel qualification

=== Operational IT-processes ===
The exam participants present a project suggestion to the IHK. The deadline will be given by the IHK. This project suggestion is part of the written documentation. Resulting of this presentation is an objective agreement between the trainee and the examination board. This objective agreement describes the content of the project documentation. If the documentation is conform to the objective agreement the trainee has to present the documentation to the examination board of IHK. The presentation should be at least 20 min. and at maximum 30 min. The trainee should use more than one media, for example PowerPoint, Flipchart and Overhead projector. After the presentation the technical discussion follows, the presentation and the technical discussion should take a minimum of 60 and a maximum of 90 min. altogether. The topic of the technical discussion does not have to be the topic of the presentation.

=== Specific IT- expert tasks ===
Every profile has its own test exercises. In this exam you will find 3 case scenarios with a handling time up to 150 min. per scenario but together a maximum of 540 min. One part is in English but can be answered in German.

=== How to score and how to pass ===
You have to pass the exams at least with acceptable results but the part operational IT-processes will count double compared with the other parts. Exam „operational IT-processes ": Ø* The documentation and the presentation are balanced.

Exam „specific IT- expert tasks" and " leadership of employees and human resources management ": Ø* The overall result is the arithmetic average of the single results.

If the trainee passed in the exam “leadership of employees and human resources management” in the part preparing and performing a training phase or preparing and performing a personnel qualification and also passed the Operative Professional overall, he has the qualification to train job trainees in an apprenticeship.
