= Compat.egov =

European Research project

COMPAT.eGov
- Competency Assessment and Training for the Uptake of eGovernment Services by Public Authorities
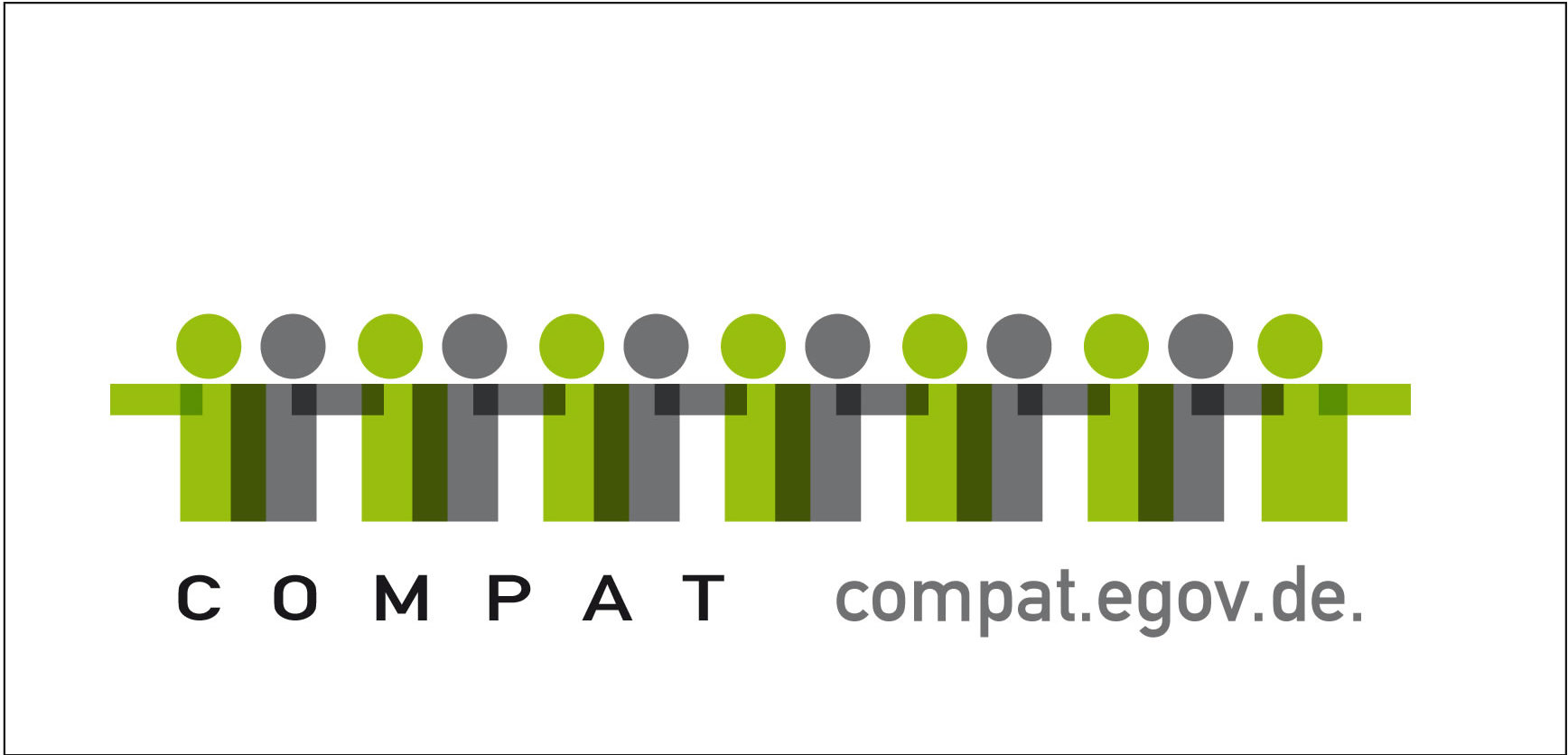
- Keywords: Government, e-Learning, Research
- Project type: European Research Consortium Project (Lifelong Learning Programme of the European Commission)
- Funding agency: European Commission
- Framework programme: Lifelong Learning Programme
- Reference: DE/10/LLP-LdV/TOI/147361
- Objective: Creation of a system and web portal for e-Government competence assessment and training
- Project coordinator: University of Potsdam, Friederike Thessel
- Participants: University of Duisburg-Essen, Germany; (CERTH) Centre for Research and Technology Hellas, Greece; Devplus, Greece; (SIBIU) Regional Training Centre for Local Public Administration Sibiu, Romania; Senatsverwaltung für Inneres und Sport Berlin, Germany; (CHIOS) Chios Chamber of Commerce, Greece; IT-WORLD.BG, Bulgaria
- Budget: Total: 277.143 Euro
- Duration: October 2010 – December 2012
- Website: www.compategov.eu

COMPAT.eGov is a European LLP research project financed through the Lifelong Learning Programme of the European Union. The project consortium is composed of eight partners from four countries.

The general objective of the COMPAT.eGov project is to improve the efficiency of European professional education in the governmental sector. The project is based on the supposed need for initiatives which focus on the competence assessment and relevant training frameworks in this sector and others, which has been identified as a priority by the EU. The EU has also indicated this through initiatives such as "2010 – A European Information Society for growth and employment".

== Overview of COMPAT.eGov ==
According to information publicized by the project, COMPAT.eGov focuses on aspects such as:

- enhancing professional training of public authorities in the incorporation of online services
- identifying alternative ways for governmental agencies and public authorities to serve the citizens efficiently in areas/cases where the deployment of physical services and personnel is costly or not possible.
- establishing an assessment framework that to elaborate on the competence identification of civil servants, in relation to the eGov paradigm
- providing correspondence with the European Qualification Framework, so that the civil servants’ competencies are better understood and the qualification levels of different countries and different education and training systems can be better compared.

== COMPAT.eGov Main Objectives ==
The COMPAT.eGov project claims to work towards the following objectives:

1. to broaden the analysis of the needs regarding eGov services support that has been done in countries participating in the consortium and examine additional countries with different degrees of eGov services deployment and adoption
2. to review the status of existing eGov services in the participating countries
3. to provision for alignment between the competence assessment framework to be used within the project and the EQF
4. to adapt existing training scenarios, content and curriculum, already developed in previous initiatives, promoting the combination of ICT-based learning with traditional forms of learning (such as seminars and learning groups), while their aim will be to train civil servants in understanding and reaping the benefits from eGov services.
5. to provision for alignment between this training approach and ECVET recommendations
6. to deploy a multilingual online environment (COMPAT.eGov portal) in which users will be able to access content (in the form of Digital Training Objects / DTO's and Digital Competence Models / DCMs) related to the project's approach in the area of eGov competence assessment and training
7. to carry out a set of pilot sessions with a number of representative user groups (civil servants from the participating public authorities) and to evaluate the proposed approach.
8. finally, to formulate a set of policy recommendations to policy makers and regional authorities about ways they can use the outcomes of the project in order to support the eGov competence assessment and training

== Results on which the Project is Based ==
The transfer of innovation and the relevant outcomes / results to be exploited within COMPAT.eGov are based on a series of previous projects:

- Rural Inclusion ICT PSP Project
- WACOM LdV Project
- eCOTOOL LdV Project
- Rural eGov LdV Project

== See also ==
- Seventh Framework Programme
- Semantic web
- European Research Council
- Directorate-General for Research (European Commission)
- European Institute of Innovation and Technology
- AGRICOM Project
