= WACOM =

Wacom or WACOM may refer to:

- Wacom, a Japanese producer of graphics tablets and related products
- WACOM (WAter COmpetences Model), a European educational project
- World Apostolic Congress on Mercy
