= The Integrated Qualifications Register =

The Integrated Qualifications Register (IQR) is a public register of worker qualifications awarded in Poland.

The IQR can include various types of qualifications awarded in Poland. Qualifications will be entered into the IQR regardless of whether they are included in other registers (lists, inventories) of qualifications kept by various ministries, sectors, communities and institutions. The entry of a qualification into the IQR means that the credibility of such qualification has been confirmed by public authorities and that a given qualification has been assigned to a PQF level. Qualifications not entered into the IQR will not be assigned to a Polish Qualifications Framework level.

The terms and conditions for entering qualifications into the IQR shall be determined by provisions of the law. The descriptions of all qualifications in the IQR will be presented in a uniform format. The information gathered in the IQR will be accessible through an NQS internet portal, integrated with the EQF portal. The IQR will play the role of a unique "link" between qualifications sub-systems that have been operating autonomously until now.

The IQR will be a collaborative effort of central and local government institutions, the education system and higher education institutions, employer organisations, trade unions, other employee organisations and civil society organisations. The entry of a qualification into the national register will mean that such a qualification has been assigned to a PQF level. Therefore, a registered qualification (both "full" and "partial") will also be referenced to a level of the European Qualifications Framework. The IQR will be operated as a repository of all data relevant to the qualifications it includes, stored in electronic format.
