= Forestur =

Tourism specialist training

Forestur is a pilot project, co-financed by the European Union through the Leonardo da Vinci Programme, aiming at increasing the skills of tourism professionals in rural areas by providing lifelong learning services on-line.

== Objectives of the project ==
The main objective of the project is to provide tourist professionals in rural areas with continuous, specific and high quality training adapted to their needs.

Considering the isolation and tight schedules of people who work in rural areas, Internet is the only reliable way to provide them with a proper training. Information and Communication Technologies (ICT) can counteract the disadvantages of remote geographical locations. So, it becomes an ideal tool to reach rural tourism employees.

Forestur has also taken advantage of other ICT features that represent an alternative choice to traditional management for other sector companies. They offer a wider range for advertising activities to simplify administrative work. In order to make the most of ICT possibility training, Forestur has identified specific needs of rural tourist sector and has developed a training methodology based on the use of asynchronous communication and social integration. Asynchronous communication means that teacher and student do not connect at a real time like on-line chats or phone calls. It is done at a different time, so that there exists a time space between the question and the answer. It is exactly the same as e-mailing or posting.

The asynchronous communication model utilized by Forestur facilitates course accessibility for students. Furthermore, integration of the students' specific sociocultural context into the curriculum design has proven effective in increasing engagement and tailoring educational content to the target audience.

Forestur training program tries to consolidate tourism as an economic engine for multiple European rural areas in the nowadays economic context, full of doubts and challenges. One of these challenges is to achieve a sustainable growth for our societies. Therefore, Forestur bets on the inversion in the human capital of rural tourism, knowing the natural interest of this sector in preserving the environment.

=== Target group ===
The project is mainly addressed to tourism professionals (employees and managers) who develop their work in rural areas. Potential users are: local development agencies and policy makers, tourism associations and service companies in rural areas; continuous training professionals (teachers and directives) and people in charge of development policies in local and regional tourism.

=== Used tools ===
- Report on specific training needs in the rural tourism sector in the four participating countries
- ICT-based training methodology adapted to the tourism sector
- Training materials suitable for tourism professionals in remote areas (CD format and downloadable from the project website)
- On-line training platform (open source software)
- Support manuals for trainers and trainees

=== Results ===
Forestur initial conclusions suggested the need of a gradual incorporation of the use of ICT, beginning with a presence training, followed by a semi-presence training to end in a complete on-line training. Forestur results have helped to improve the professionalism of employees lacking in specialized training such as customer service, usage of new technologies, language competence and the approach of quality management in tourism establishments.

== Partnership ==
Professionals from Hungary, Italy and Romania are taking part of this project together with La Florida, the Fundación Comunidad Valenciana Región Europea (FCVRE) and Tuéjar town council:

- Florida Training Centre
- Fundación Comunidad Valenciana - Región Europea
- CIDAF. Innovation & Business Development Center
- Bucovina Tourism Association
- Pixel
- CIA. Confederazion Italiana Agricoltori della Provincia de Firenze
- Europrofessional Hungary EC
- Hungarian Federation of Rural and Agrotourism
- Tuejar Town Council
