= Apprentices mobility =

Travel of educators between institutions

Apprentices mobility is the movement of students and teachers in vocational education or training (VET) to another institution inside or outside their own country to study or teach for a limited time. The term is usually used in the context of European Union (EU) policy.

Under the EU Lisbon agenda, attempts have been made to lower cultural, socio-economical and academic barriers to mobility. Mobile learners are usually divided into two groups: free-movers, learners who travel entirely on their own initiative, and programme students, who use exchange programmes at the department, faculty, institution or national level (such as Leonardo da Vinci II).

== Terminology ==
The practice of going abroad to learn has been denoted by different terms in different contexts over the years, such as "exchange" or "transnational mobility". For the specific practice of sending people abroad on placements in public and private enterprise, the more neutral term of "placements abroad" has been preferred.

Many different practices use the term "placement" as a denominator for their activities, and some form of definition is necessary to distinguish between these, and to mark it off from ordinary employment abroad as well as other forms of transnational mobility. Placements may be set up by an organiser who has made the necessary arrangements for a placement, defined the intended learning outcome, and thought out the pedagogic implications. Placements may also be self-organized by the participant. When a student organizes a work stay in another country during holidays or a study break, may qualify as placements depending on the intent. If the purpose is to acquire vocational skills and/or improve language and intercultural skills in general, it should be seen as a placement, and count it as such, rather than a holiday job.

It may be inscribed in an educational context through accreditation of prior experiential learning (APEL), if the organization can be convinced that the person in question has sought out learning situations during the stay rather than just focused on having a good time or earning as much money as possible. Other activities in this borderline category are au pair placements and voluntary work in charitable institutions and organisations, e.g. as financed under the European Voluntary Service.

The practice of some companies to send employees abroad in foreign subsidiaries for a period of time in order to acquire specific competences may also be considered under this label. It should be distinguished from employment abroad in general, which is another matter. The line is blurred, and different definitions may collide here. Any labour market activity where the participant draws some kind of wages or salary is juridically considered as employment. But payment is not necessarily a way of distinguishing between placements and proper jobs; placements may be paid or unpaid, even though the learning role of participants is often signified by the fact that they receive no – or a considerably reduced – payment.

== History ==
Mobility of VET learners can be traced to the tradition of the traveling journeyman of the medieval guilds. Dedicated transnational placement programmes appeared after the Second World War when the organizations AIESEC and IAESTE were set up under the auspices of UNESCO in 1948 to facilitate placements for students of commerce and technology in higher education.

Another placement programme was set up in 1964 by the Commission of the European Communities in the shape of the Young workers' exchange programme (YWEP). In 1981 a binational Franco- German programme for placements (exchanges) in VET was established within the framework of the Franco-German Treaty of 1963.

The Comett programme from 1987 – also set up by the European Commission – grant aided placements of students in higher education in order to promote cooperation between universities and industry and to facilitate transfer of technology. Action 4 of the Lingua programme from 1990 contained funding provisions for young people in VET to undertake placement periods abroad in order to improve foreign language proficiency.

Up to the early 1990s, however, mobility in VET – and in particular in initial VET and for young workers – was very limited and certainly not a realistic proposition except for a very small minority of the total population engaged in VET. Mobility took a quantum leap upwards on the agenda of European and national VET-policies more or less precisely a decade ago, notably with the introduction of the enlarged Petra programme (Petra II) in 1992. That year, 8500 placements were grant-aided through the programme, and by the end of the programme period in 1995, the total number approached 35 000 for the then 12 EU Member States. A significant development at national level was the establishment by the Danish government in 1992 of the PIU programme, which gave people in initial vocational training not just the opportunity but the right to undertake all or part of their mandatory work placements in another EU or EFTA country. Funding was provided by Danish employers through the Employers' reimbursement scheme for apprentices and trainees (AER). This was the first of several national programmes for placements abroad that have since been set up in various countries.

== Criteria for defining placements abroad in VET ==
Criteria have been established to define what a work placement is, in order to differentiate it from other activities. A placement:

1. is carried out in an authentic work environment. The placement period is not an artificially created situation, where the central feature is the learning of the participant. The most important thing here is continuing production, and learning is placed second or third or even lower down on the scale of priorities;
2. implies involvement in concrete work processes. The participants are not merely onlookers to the activities, but are given an active role;
3. is for a limited time. Placements are planned and carried out as a period abroad that is set in a (national) learning context – i.e. surrounded by this on both sides. They are not open-ended. Duration, however, may vary considerably, from two weeks to two years. To this we may add another features, which we should term characteristics rather than criteria, since they need not always be applicable.

A placement thus as a rule:

1. demands professional experience as the "entry ticket". Workplaces where it is possible to become integrated in work processes immediately without any prior training or experience are few and far between. Therefore, participation in most placement projects is contingent upon either a wholly or partly completed training course or solid practical experience;
2. is not under the supervision of trained pedagogical staff. Contrary to a school environment or youth exchanges, there are usually no pedagogically trained staff (teachers) or experienced youth leaders around to offer guidance and practical support during the placement period. Mentors may be appointed, but the supervision of the participants is only a secondary task for them;
3. does not take place among peer groups. In school stays or youth exchanges, the participants will often be surrounded by people in the same age bracket and societal position who are in a similar life situation. At the workplace, however, there is a broad spectrum of colleagues, who are largely in a different position from the participant and have different dreams, expectations and interests.

Some activities are excluded from the definition, For example, "work camps" organised to improve intercultural understanding bring together young people from many countries to accomplish a practical task such as building a playground, or restoring a building to be used by the local community. However, the work situation is an artificially created one, there are trained supervisors present, and the group is composed of young people in the same age bracket. Study visits are also excluded: even though they may be in authentic work environments, the participants are merely engaged as onlookers.

A definition of the term "placement abroad" is "a shorter or longer period spent abroad in a public or private enterprise, which has been consciously organised for learning purposes, which implies active involvement in concrete work processes, and which can be paid or unpaid". The phenomenon is often associated with past and present programmes of the European Commission. These have grant-aided placements abroad, represent the largest single programmes and initiatives, and provide the best statistical material. Currently, the Leonardo da Vinci programme is much in evidence in discussions on mobility in VET for exactly these reasons. The practice goes well beyond these programmes, however, and encompasses also programmes and initiatives at binational, national and regional level, as well as the activities of organisations and individuals, which are undertaken without any recourse to programme funding.

== Benefits ==
Placements abroad can be a pedagogical exercise. Mobility in a context of education and training differs substantially from other types of mobility in that it is primarily a pedagogical exercise: it is a tool used to produce certain kinds of learning of an affective and/or cognitive nature in the participant.

Placements abroad can be a means for achieving intercultural understanding, learning how to live peacefully together in Europe and in the world and develop a sense of "European Citizenship" as opposed to a strictly nationalist outlook (corresponding to the initial thoughts of Jean Monnet when forging the European Coal and Steel Union in 1951 – as a means to promote peace and understanding in a war-torn Europe). Latterly, this discourse has also been used in connection with the fight against racism and xenophobia. An example refers the activities of the Franco-German Youth Office.

Placements abroad can be a method for acquiring 'new basic skills' and developing 'employability'. The world has changed fundamentally in the last decade. The world is flattening. We can focus on the many differences between apprentices and placements in Europe. And we can continue to question the importance of experience abroad for apprentices and other young people in IVET, who often work in small and medium-sized enterprises with a regional focus. However. the reality is that experience of mobility provides apprentices and IVET students with particular competences over and above those obtained from the vocational curriculum including communicative, social, meaning-related and change-related skills. These critical competences benefit the individual apprentice and IVET student personally and they are also likely to make them more employable.

Within this discourse, the rationale for the activity lies in the use of placements abroad as a didactic tool to equip participants with so called "key skills" that enable them to cope with the constant changes in occupational profiles, work organization and career paths arising as a consequence of globalization and technological change. This corresponds to a focus on education and training as a motor for economic growth, and the aims of the Lisbon-declaration concerning the creation of a 'Europe of knowledge'.

Placements abroad can be an activity linked to internationalization of education and training in Europe. In this case they are the response of national educational systems to the perceived negative effects of globalization. At the level of the individual, it enables the future workforce to acquire foreign language skills and intercultural skills so that they can deal with increased foreign contacts at the workplace. At systemic level, it allows national educational systems to fill in temporary gaps in training provision by sending trainees abroad to where such opportunities exist.

Increasingly, employees from all levels need to be able to operate in an environment that deals with international customers and suppliers. Those companies and sectors who earn their money abroad, or work with foreign suppliers, are more likely to be engaged in mobility. Although right now less than 50% of small and medium enterprises (SMEs) are internationalized, figures by the World Trade Organization, show that more and more economies are dependent on external and foreign trade. It is likely that this will increase the pressure on employers to hire people with a 'worldly mindset'. In the best tradition of 'Master craftsmen' who only got their credentials after having been abroad, sectors can use this changing environment to train their future employees. To facilitate knowledge-transfer between sectors, economies and generations, education should continue to play its role here.

Placements abroad can be a method for promoting the free movement of workers in Europe. In this case they are concerned with learning how to live and work in another country, how to become a 'migrant worker' willing and able to move across borders and thereby allay skills shortages in other Member States (corresponding to the thoughts in the Treaty of Rome from 1957 creating the European Economic Communities, where the free circulation of labour across borders was seen as an essential element in the economic development of Europe).

The rationales for mobility may differ for each actor. At EU level, several reasons for stimulating mobility are mentioned, i.e. more mobility between regions and jobs represents an essential part of the Lisbon Agenda, mobility is a tool for acquiring language skills and mobility contributes to increasing stability and peace of the EU. More exposure to other countries leads to increased intercultural awareness and good feelings about host nation/culture. Mobility implies acquiring international skills, which become increasingly important with the liberalization of trade and commerce. For individuals, mobility implies developing personal skills and competencies

For vocational schools and training centres hosting students and apprentices and other young people in IVET from abroad creates an international atmosphere that brings benefits for the whole institution (e.g. inspiration of other students, learning language). Transnational mobility projects can serve as a launch pad for transnational partnerships and for a proactive internationalization strategy and policy. For employers, reasons for engaging in mobility can be a faster diffusion and acquisition of knowledge and skills.

=== Benefits for employers ===
- Mobility is a means to address both short-term and long-term shortages in skills.
- Greater use of mobile workers and trainees is an important measure to cope with recruitment difficulties. In the long run, companies can include recruitment for young people in their human resource policies.
- While time for adaptation to key technologies is becoming shorter, the mobility of employees can facilitate a fast diffusion of knowledge.
- Hiring of trainees implies low costs. The risk of hiring trainees for the sole purpose of lowering the labour costs needs to be mitigated by some forms of control and accreditation by the education system.

=== Benefits for the individual ===
- Mobility implies acquiring of international skills, what becomes increasingly important with the liberalization of trade and commerce.
- Mobility implies developing of personal skills and competencies such as change-related, relational, learning-related, and meaning-related skills.

=== Benefits for vocational schools and training centres ===
- Hosting students and apprentices from abroad creates an international atmosphere that brings benefit for the whole institution (e.g. inspiration of other students, learning language).
- VET-institutions have the possibility to benchmark their course contents and pedagogic practices.
- Involvement of a VET-institution in mobility activities makes it attractive for students in comparison with other 'not-towards-mobility-oriented' institutions.
- Transnational mobility projects can serve as a launch pad for transnational partnerships and for a proactive internationalization strategy and policy.
- The role of VET-institutions is gradually changing from a traditional 'school' towards a regional knowledge centre. There is a need to reflect internationalization in their array of competences and skills.
- Mobility projects might imply income-generating activities.

== Take-up statistics ==
Initially, we should distinguish between placements abroad organized within the framework of programmes and spontaneous placement activities happening outside of these. We have only very limited ability to measure the placements abroad that are undertaken outside of dedicated programmes, or in programmes or initiatives that deal with wider issues and where placements abroad are only a possibility, and not a distinct programme activity. Anything concerning this must thus be based on guesswork.

Even when concentrating on dedicated mobility programmes (or programmes where mobility is a distinct activity) are we faced with problems.

First, problems of definition can make comparability difficult.

Second (and partly as a consequence of this), the way in which information is gathered (and what is gathered) may differ from programme to programme, which makes it yet more difficult to come up with robust and comparable information. It is not possible to see from the statistical material available whether some activities were undertaken as placements or as another form of mobility. Moreover, mobility programmes (or programmes incorporating mobility activities) are undertaken in many different contexts, and there is virtually no national level overview of all mobility activities.

The annual Dutch BISON monitoring report of international mobility within education and training remains an isolated initiative, but it includes only mobility taking place within the framework of educational establishments. In addition, all the information available is concerned with outgoing mobility (the sending aspect), and there is no indication of incoming mobility (hosting). This lack of quantitative data makes it very difficult to arrive at any figures concerning both the participation rates and financing involved.

For the Leonardo da Vinci programme, we can give very precise indications on participation rates and the amount of funding in the programme, but we do not have figures on funding that also involves national cofinancing. Given the different ways of calculating this from project to project, and the varying percentage of Commission funding, a conservative estimate would put this at a level equal to the commission's contribution (e.g. for the second phase of the Leonardo da Vinci programme, approximately EUR 600 million).

=== Take-up through programmes ===
The Leonardo da Vinci programme remains the biggest single funding mechanism for transnational mobility in VET in Europe, and in some countries it is more or less the only programme within VET that can be used for funding placements abroad on any significant scale. In other countries there are more funding opportunities.

In the Netherlands 1 230 people benefited from a Leonardo mobility grant in the year 1999-2000 (total figure, including short study tours undertaken by teachers, instructors and human resource specialists).

The total number of people participating in transnational mobility activities in VET in the same period, however, is registered by the BISON monitoring report as close to 7000 (6877). Of these, 204 come from the Lingua programme (i.e. another EU programme), but 5158 were financed through the national Onbegrensd talent programme.

Unfortunately we cannot assess the exact amount spent on placements abroad from this programme, since the funds are allocated as lump sums to educational establishments for broad 'internationalization' purposes. Also, we cannot compare factors like length of stay and target countries. Even without information on mobility financed through other sources than the established programmes, it would seem that Leonardo accounts for less than one fifth of the total figure for mobility within VET in the Netherlands. It is problematic, however, to transpose this figure to the rest of Europe for want of a reliable yardstick for measurement and comparison. In many instances, grant allocations and/or numbers involved are used as indicators. Another complication is that a mere headcount will not give a correct picture of the scope of mobility in VET.

In the Danish PIU programme, the participants (apprentices) stay abroad for eight to nine months on average, which has greater effect than, for example, a two-week stay financed under Lingua/Socrates. Similarly, Danish apprentices are paid the appropriate apprentice wage by their employer in the host country, which means that programme costs measured by grant allocation only will not give a real picture of the total costs involved. However, some countries have only the Leonardo programme to finance mobility, which tips the scales in the other direction when trying to figure out a European average for participation and funding of mobility.

=== Take-up through spontaneous mobility ===
Quantifiable information on spontaneous mobility is virtually non-existent, even though we have anecdotal evidence of its existence as a factor. We might have got an indication of sorts from the German Sprungbrett programme; a national-level mobility programme which started in 2003, which gave grants to individuals within initial VET undertaking placement periods in other European countries. Unfortunately this programme was discontinued at the end of 2003 due to budget cuts.

Measuring the factors such as the numbers of applications received may give us a rough estimate of this activity in at least one Member State, but only in initial vocational training, where spontaneous mobility is likely to be low for reasons of age. Almost equally impossible to assess are the activities that are undertaken as pilot projects within programmes that on the surface have nothing to do with the issue of placements abroad.

An example of this is the Eurojoker project, which was financed out of funds from the EU Konver II initiative. In this project (duration March 1999 – May 2000) young unemployed persons from the Brandenburg region in Germany were sent on one year placements in other European countries with a view to increasing their employability.

Locating such projects mainly relies on the unofficial network of the person collecting the data, or happens by chance. It follows that any estimate of the numbers and amounts involved will doubtless be inaccurate. The scarcity of data is equally pronounced for the qualitative aspects of the phenomenon. Given the scope of activities, it is strange to note that studies on the qualitative aspects of placements abroad as a didactic tool in the context of VET are sparse.

== Evaluations of programmes ==
Very few evaluations of mobility programmes and projects have been undertaken at European or national level, and even fewer of these concentrate on the learning aspects.

Most of the evaluations undertaken are summative evaluations carried out by or for programme administrators with a view to justifying expenses and administrative practices, and have little to say about learning. After the conclusion of the first phase of the Leonardo da Vinci programme, a ‘valorisation’ exercise was carried out on selected aspects of the programme, both at national and at European level.

Valorisation is not the same as traditional evaluation or impact assessment, but focuses mainly on the achievements of the programme with a view to formulating recommendations for improvements and future priorities. It is not a very well defined methodology, and valorisation exercises consequently vary greatly from country to country, as well as in quality. Each country was given the possibility to choose between certain themes, and mobility was an issue in several countries covered by this study (Denmark, France, Iceland, Norway, and the UK) as well as an element in European-level valorisation.

Other than these evaluations, research-based treatment of the theme of placements abroad is virtually non-existent. Some work, however, has been done on organisational matters, notably on legal and administrative barriers, culminating with the commission's Green Paper on obstacles to mobility from 1996.

The main source of funding for development activities (in the majority of countries the only source) is the strand for pilot-projects under the Leonardo da Vinci programme. The recognition of qualifications acquired abroad is a major issue here. However, only 57 projects dealing with mobility-related subjects could be identified (out of a total project number of over 3000) in the first phase of the programme (1995–99). Prominent themes were placement finding, preparation, and quality assurance.

== See also ==
- Apprenticeship
- Education
- German model
- Guild
- Indentured servant
- International student
- Journeyman
- Tradesman
- Vocational education
