= ECOTOOL =

International project

eCOTOOL
- e-competences tools
- Keywords: Europass, EQF, ECVET, competences, agriculture
- Project type: European Research Consortium Project (Lifelong Learning Programme of the European Commission)
- Funding agency: European Commission
- Framework programme: Lifelong Learning Programme
- Reference: 504614 - LLP - 1 - 2009 - DE - Leonardo - LMP
- Objective: Improving the use of VET certificates through harmonization of European instruments
- Project coordinator: Christian M. Stracke
- Participants: University of Duisburg-Essen (UDE); Federal Institute for Professional Education and Training (BIBB); Mediterranean Agronomic Institute of Chania (MAICh); Hellenic Organization for Standardization (ELOT); Agro-Know Technologies; Institute of Agricultural Economics and Information (UZEI); Chamber of Agriculture and Forestry of Slovenia (KGZS); Institute for the Development of Professional Training (ISFOL); KION; University of Bolton
- Budget: Total: 530,000 Euro
- Duration: December 2009 – November 2011
- Website: www.ecompetence.eu

eCOTOOL (e-competences tools) was an international project undertaken through the European Union's Lifelong Learning Programme, specifically the Leonardo da Vinci programme. It ran from 1 June 2009 until 30 November 2011, with the primary objective of dealing with initial and continuing professional education in the European Union.

eCOTOOL focused on:

1. the improvement of the development, exchange, and maintenance of professional education certificates and their accessibility and transparency and
2. increasing European mobility and transparency in general.

== Overview ==
The objective of eCOTOOL was to improve the development, exchange, and maintenance of VET certificates and their accessibility and transparency by harmonizing Europass with other European instruments (EQF, ECVET) and e‐competences. This aimed to increase European mobility and the transparency of VET systems through:

1. The development of an Application Profile and Technical Tools based on the Europass Certificate Supplement (CS) under the Brand "Europass CS eco‐tools"
2. The Adaptation of all Europass CS eco‐tools to the Agricultural Sector and their Pilot Testing and Optimization

The eCOTOOL project attempted to provide advanced and sustainable instruments and tools for the Europass CS. In an attempt to achieve these objectives eCOTOOL developed the adaptable Europass CS eco‐tools based on the European policies Europass Certificate Supplement (CS), EQF, ECVET, and PAS 1093. The Europass CS eco‐tools were first tested and evaluated in the agricultural sector. Finally the eCOTOOL results were submitted to the European Standardization Committees (CEN/TC 353) to contribute to a European consensus and standard for VET competences.

== Project Outcome ==
The main benefits of the Europass CS eco‐tools are:

- Better accessibility to existing Europass Certificate Supplements (CS) by ensuring full interoperability amongst any given IT system
- Easier development and maintenance of further Europass Certificate Supplements
- Simple exchange of Europass Certificate Supplements between any online platforms and repositories
- Enhancing European mobility by improving comparisons of VET solutions and their certificates

== Brief description of the eCOTOOL products ==
First an application profile was developed as an information model from the European instruments to become the European standard for certificate repositories based on the Europass CS specification. This information model was delivered with a full XML binding to complete the Europass CS eco‐tools and to support and facilitate their dissemination to and application in all European countries.

=== The application profile ===
The application profile was disseminated and populated at the website and was freely accessible, applicable and adaptable for all interested European stakeholders. It attempted to facilitate the further development, the maintenance of existing, and the harmonization of all future Europass Certificate Supplements within Europe by this information model which is adaptable and applicable within any branch or sector. The application profile is information model that is needed for the development of the technical tools (WP2). It retains full interoperability with Europass CS and integrate the models and taxonomies of EQF, ECVET and e‐competences.

=== The technical tools ===
The technical tools (XML bindings) attempted to facilitate the exchange of VET certificates between any information systems, databases, online platforms, and repositories for easier and better accessibility, development, and maintenance. The Europass CS Technical Tools are data models as complete XML bindings including a XML Schema Description (XSD) for the implementation within different IT systems and repositories.

=== The adaptation of the Europass CS eco‐tools to the agricultural sector ===
The Europass CS eco‐tools consist of both: the adapted Europass CS application profile and the adapted Europass CS technical tools in six languages. Freely available on the online platform, the adapted Europass CS eco‐tools attempted to facilitate the implementation, maintenance, exchange, and harmonization of Certificate Supplements within the agricultural sector.

The adaptation of the Europass CS eco‐tools includes the application profile as well as the technical tools by adding and integrating specific requirements of the agricultural sector. That covers agricultural terminology, metadata, and taxonomies as well as methodologies, settings, and didactical principles that are typical for the agricultural sector. The adaptation includes the translations for the user countries of pilot testing.

A summary and comparison of all identified VET requirements and needs is also available as one main input for the adaptation of the Europass CS eco‐tools to the agricultural sector.

The results of the eCOTOOL Project were used by other current European research projects, including the AGRICOM Project and the Compat.egov Project.

== See also ==
- Lifelong Learning Programme 2007–2013
- Leonardo da Vinci programme
