= Fachwirt =

A Fachwirt is a professional certification in Germany allocated to level 6 of the European Qualifications Framework

The Bachelor Professional (B.Pro.) and the Master Professional (M.Pro.) have been approved designations of advanced training qualifications in Germany since January 1, 2020, [1] which are recognized by all bodies responsible for vocational training in accordance with Section 3 i. V. m. § 71 Vocational Training Act BBiG can be awarded. This applies, among others, to the Chambers of Industry and Commerce, Chambers of Agriculture and the Chambers of Crafts, supplemented by the HWO Crafts Code . They should express the equivalence with the academic degrees as well as the practical relevance. [2]Section 51 paragraph 2 HWO introduced a general retroactive effect for master craftsman examinations that have already been successfully completed, exclusively for graduates of a master craftsman's examination in a trade requiring licensing. The new degree title “Bachelor Professional in ...” may also be used by people who completed their master's examination before January 1, 2020. According to the Central Association of German Crafts (ZDH), it is possible to either wear the old master's degree or the new Bachelor Professional. [3]

The following applies to all other qualifications, including those from the Chambers of Crafts: The qualifications acquired remain unchanged and as long as the respective training regulations in accordance with Section 53c et seq. or Section 54 BBiG do not contain the new qualification, graduates will not acquire a Bachelor's degree after January 1, 2020 -Professional / Master Professional designation. For the status of implementation, see the table or information published by the responsible authorities.

In accordance with Section 37 Paragraph 3 BBiG, certificate translations can be requested for the degrees acquired. Wherever possible, translation aids for degree titles (e.g. Bachelor Profession of ... CCI) were also created in the IHK area. The addition CCI stands for Chamber of Commerce and Industry or Chambre de Commerce et d'Industrie to clarify the limitation to vocational training. The translations are intended exclusively for use abroad or for clarification in international companies and may not be used as a final designation in Germany. The cultural authorities and universities in particular see a risk of confusion with university degrees and could therefore fall under the regulatory scope of Section 132a Paragraph 1 No. 1 StGB.

== Story ==
In 2003, the NRW Economics Minister Harald Schartau tried to establish the title or translation aid Bachelor Professional for the specialist economist with the support of the chamber organizations (DIHK, ZDH), parts of the trade unions (IG Metall), the Conference of Economic Ministers and specialist associations (IMV). The reason was that the terms master, specialist, etc. were not common in the world of international business. The project met with massive opposition from universities, the Conference of Ministers of Education and Cultural AffairsFederal Ministry of Education and Research and initially failed, not least because of the counter-argument that there is a clear distinction between vocational training and higher education abroad and that the name is therefore grossly misleading. Qualifications comparable to the specialist would also be known abroad, namely as higher professional certification or higher professional qualification. Despite Section 132a Paragraph 2 of the Criminal Code, around which the discussion ultimately revolves, translation assistance became very widespread on career networks on the Internet and was widely used there, unhindered, like an academic degree. The IHKs also created facts and, as public institutions, openly used the translation aids for their degrees, which meant that under Section 17 of the Criminal Code, criminal prosecution for using the translation aid was de facto ruled out. However, implementation was not uniform, as in some federal states, such as Lower Saxony and Baden-Württemberg, the supervisory authorities had explicitly prohibited the use of the Bachelor Professional translation aids.

At the end of 2018, the Ministry of Education finally declared that it wanted to officially establish the “vocational bachelor” degree by 2020, [4] in 2020 as part of the reform of the Vocational Training Act and yet under the original title of “Bachelor Professional”. [5] However, the University Rectors' Conference and the Association of German Engineers (VDI) registered protests and warned of the consequences, as there was a risk of confusion with the internationally recognized academic degrees of Bachelor and Master . [6] [7]The Federal Council also initially rejected the idea of introducing names that are similar to university degrees, in all variants discussed. [8] Despite loud protests from universities right up to the end and a critical assessment through a protocol declaration by the states of Bremen, Berlin, Hamburg and Baden-Württemberg on Top 14 “Law to Strengthen and Modernize Vocational Education” of the 983rd meeting of the Federal Council, [ 9 ], the Federal Council decided on November 29, 2019, among other things, to introduce the degrees “Bachelor Professional in” and “Master Professional in” on January 1, 2020. [10] [11]

== Assignment ==
The German Qualifications Framework DQR is exclusively a transparency instrument and has no legal basis. Therefore, there is no direct connection between a DQR level and the new qualifications. At the same time, the eighth level of the DQR reflects the German educational system, including general education and university qualifications. In this respect, §§ 53b ff. BBiG take up the system of further training qualifications, so that further training courses that are assigned to the German Qualifications Framework (DQR)/ EQR level 6 are for the Bachelor Professional qualification and the qualifications of DQR level 7 are for the qualification qualification Master Professional can be considered.
