= European Dictionary of Skills and Competences =

DISCO – European Dictionary of Skills and Competences is a structured vocabulary for the description of skills and competences in different contexts such as labour market, education, and training, and the recognition of qualifications. DISCO provides skills and competences classification that is neither linked to occupations nor to qualifications. Instead it functions as a thesaurus of skills and competences which is based on existing international standards and classifications and thus represents a terminological basis for the description of skills and competences, occupations as well as personal skill profiles and CVs, job vacancies, and job requirements or for describing curricula, courses, Diploma and Certificate Supplements or learning outcomes in general. Available in ten language versions (CZ, DE, EN, ES, FR, HU, IT, LT, SE, SK), DISCO is meant to support transnational comparability of competences acquired in an educational or work context throughout Europe.

== Development ==
DISCO was developed in two projects funded by the Leonardo da Vinci programme and the Austrian Federal Ministry of Education, Arts and Culture. Both projects were carried out together with partners from Austria, Belgium, the Czech Republic, France, Germany, Hungary, Italy, Lithuania, Spain and Sweden. DISCO I took place between September 2004 and February 2008. DISCO II started in November 2010 and ended in October 2012. During the first DISCO project, the following main results have been achieved:

- a multilingual thesaurus of skills and competences (CZ, DE, EN, FR, HU, LT, SE)
- a website (www.disco-tools.eu) including:

- search and translation of single terms
- multilingual tree-structure view of the thesaurus for experts
- a tool for the creation/translation of competence profiles, Europass CV, Mobility Passes

- a multilingual print version of the thesaurus (DE, EN, FR)

The DISCO thesaurus is based on a comprehensive understanding of skills and competences that include professional competences, personal attitudes, values, behavioral patterns etc. independent of whether they have been acquired formally, non-formally or informally. It consists of about 10,000 terms (about 7,000 preferred terms and 3,000 synonyms) per language for ten European languages: Czech, English, French, German, Hungarian, Italian, Lithuanian, Slovak, Spanish and Swedish. Related terms refer to each other where appropriate. The prototypical DISCO I thesaurus has above all focused on the development of a reasonable structure for each field which could be broadened and enlarged with more terms. DISCO has been developed in accordance with several already existing European skills/competence classifications and standards such as the following national classifications of project partner countries, and international classifications:

- AMS-Qualifikationsklassifikation (Austria)
- Kompetenzenkatalog (GE)
- Répertoire Opérationnel des Métiers et des Emplois – ROME (France)
- Taxonomy database of Arbetsförmedlingen (Sweden)
- EURES CV
- International Standard Classification of Education 1997

== Use ==
Using DISCO to describe learning outcomes is an important focus of the DISCO II follow-up project. Job descriptions, CVs, Certificate Supplements as well as other competence-based learning outcomes descriptions use similar terms to describe competences in the area of labour market or education and training. The least common denominator is a single competence term, the greatest common denominator is a phraseological competence description consisting, from a linguistic point of view, of a verb and an object, and possibly context information or attributive enlargements. In DISCO II, the project partnership used Certificate Supplements and other relevant skills profiles and extracted a list of relevant phraseological competence descriptions for the sectors of health care, ICT, environmental protection and social services. The minimal skills and competence phrases collected within DISCO II are applicable in the field of education, but also for describing tasks in job vacancies and similar job requirement documents as well as in qualifications, professional profiles. The vocabulary available through DISCO – i.e. based on skills/competences – is used to describe occupational as well as qualifications information. Within the ongoing ESCO development – European Skills/Competences, qualifications and Occupations – DISCO is used as one of the sources to enhance the skills/competence pillar.

DISCO is also used in several European projects dealing with mobility and transparency of skills and competences, such as YOMTOOL (Youth on the Move Toolkit) or Skillsbank (an ECVET oriented toolkit targeting career guidance and individual training support).

On national level, DISCO is used at the Hungarian Europass Centre where the English/French/German/Hungarian-language versions are used for the 'Europass CV wizzard' that utilises DISCO as an integrated online glossary for the Europass CV. In Austria, the Software Competence Centre Hagenberg uses DISCO for developing innovative online job placement software.
