= International Training Center for Bankers =

- Native name: Bankárképző
- Industry: Financial services education
- Founded: 1988; 38 years ago
- Founder: French Banking Training Center (CFPB) and 8 Hungarian banks
- Headquarters: Budapest, Hungary
- Area served: Central and Eastern Europe, the Balkans and former USSR countries
- Products: Diploma programs, educational program, financial education, professional training for finance industry
- Website: www.bankarkepzo.hu

International Training Center for Bankers (ITCB) (Hungarian: Bankárképző) is a Budapest-based banking academy and consultancy. It provides diploma programs, training, certification and consultancy for the finance industry in central and eastern Europe.

== History ==
ITCB was founded in 1988 by Centre de Formation de la Profession Bancaire, the French banking academy and the post-Socialist commercial banks in Hungary to promote the know-how transfer of economics, finance and commercial banking in the first years of Hungary’s successful economic transition to a market economy. After the restructuring and early privatization, ITCB has remained Hungary’s market-leader banking consulting, training and research company. As Hungary was a regional champion in liberalizing, privatizing and opening her banking and financial markets, ITCB's trainers and consultants have played important roles in the dissemination of this know-how in Central Europe, the Balkans and the former Soviet republics.

In 2006, the International Training Centre for Bankers became part of the Certification & Accreditation System for Financial Services Sector Education and Training which is a transnational project, started in October 2006, being developed in the framework of the Leonardo da Vinci Programme, which is supported by the European Banking Federation and co-ordinated by the European Banking and Financial Services Training Association.

== See also ==
- List of banks in Hungary
