= Leonardo da Vinci programme =

Logotype

The Leonardo da Vinci programme is a European Commission funding programme focused on the teaching and training needs of those involved in professional education. The programme is part of the European Commission's Lifelong Learning Programme 2007–2013 and aims to help the European labour market by helping European citizens acquire qualifications and have them recognised across borders.

== History ==
The Leonardo da Vinci programme was started in 1995.

In 1998, the whistleblowing of Paul van Buitenen criticised misdirection of funds in the EU, particularly in Leonardo da Vinci professional training programmes.

A second, broader phase (Leonardo II 2000–2006) more focused on skills and employability of young people was evaluated for the Directorate General for Education and Culture of the European Commission in 2008. Of the 21,000 projects financed in this phase, 19,000 out of the 367,000 individuals had to do with mobility. The budget was €1.45 billion.

In 2007, a new programme was started, to run until 2013.

== Supported projects ==
The programme funds transnational mobility and European projects focusing on the development or transfer of innovation and networks. All of the projects funded by the Leonardo da Vinci programme involve working with European partners. Some of the projects supported are:

- Central (Certification for Employment iN Transport and Logistics in Europe) Project
- Certification & Accreditation System for Financial Services Sector Education and Training (International Training Center for Bankers)
- CHIRON – benchmarking e-learning
- DISCO – European Dictionary of Skills and Competences
- EADIS – European Automotive Digital Innovation Studio – training to try to keep the European automotive industry competitive
- ECOTOOL – harmonisation of VET certification
- Forestur – training for tourism professionals
- MarTEL – a test of maritime English language proficiency
- Ploteus − a portal for European space
- Spreadthesign − multilingual dictionary for sign languages

== See also ==
- ALMA Initiative
- Apprentices mobility
