= European Qualifications Framework =

Common European reference framework for educational qualifications

The European Qualifications Framework (EQF) acts as a translation device to make national qualifications more readable across Europe, promoting workers' and learners' mobility between countries and facilitating their lifelong learning. The EQF aims to relate different countries' national qualifications systems to a common European reference framework. Individuals and employers will be able to use the EQF to better understand and compare the qualifications levels of different countries and different education and training systems. Since 2012, all new qualifications issued in Europe carry a reference to an appropriate EQF level.

== Structure ==
The core of the EQF concerns eight reference levels describing what a learner knows, understands and is able to do – 'learning outcomes'. Levels of national qualifications will be placed at one of the central reference levels, ranging from basic (Level 1) to advanced (Level 8). This will enable a much easier comparison between national qualifications and should also mean that people do not have to repeat their learning if they move to another country. To compare EQF in different countries, the European Commission provides an online comparison tool.

Descriptors defining levels in the European Qualifications Framework (EQF)
Level	Knowledge	Skills	Responsibility and autonomy	Example
	In the context of EQF, knowledge is described as theoretical and/or factual.	In the context of EQF, skills are described as cognitive (involving the use of logical, intuitive and creative thinking) and practical (involving manual dexterity and the use of methods, materials, tools and instruments).	In the context of the EQF responsibility and autonomy is described as the ability of the learner to apply knowledge and skills autonomously and with responsibility	
Level 1	Basic general knowledge	basic skills required to carry out simple tasks	work or study under direct supervision in a structured context	(UK) RQF entry level 3.
Level 2	Basic factual knowledge of a field of work or study	basic cognitive and practical skills required to use relevant information in order to carry out tasks and to solve routine problems using simple rules and tools	work or study under supervision with some autonomy	(UK) GCSE grades 3-1 (England) or D-G (Wales and Northern Ireland), RQF Level 1, Scottish National 4; (Finland) Lower secondary school
Level 3	Knowledge of facts, principles, processes and general concepts, in a field of work or study	a range of cognitive and practical skills required to accomplish tasks and solve problems by selecting and applying basic methods, tools, materials and information	take responsibility for completion of tasks in work or study; adapt own behaviour to circumstances in solving problems	(UK) GCSE grades 9-4 (England) or A*-C (Wales and Northern Ireland), RQF level 2, Scottish National 5.
Level 4	Factual and theoretical knowledge in broad contexts within a field of work or study	a range of cognitive and practical skills required to generate solutions to specific problems in a field of work or study	exercise self-management within the guidelines of work or study contexts that are usually predictable, but are subject to change; supervise the routine work of others, taking some responsibility for the evaluation and improvement of work or study activities	(UK) A-level, RQF level 3, Scottish Higher; (Germany) Abitur, Ma. (France) Baccalauréat, vocational school. (Netherlands) Voorbereidend wetenschappelijk onderwijs. (Italy) Maturità (Spain) Bachillerato
Level 5 (Note: The descriptor for the higher education short cycle (within or linked to the first cycle), developed by the Joint Quality Initiative as part of the Bologna process, corresponds to the learning outcomes for EQF level 5.)	Comprehensive, specialised, factual and theoretical knowledge within a field of work or study and an awareness of the boundaries of that knowledge	a comprehensive range of cognitive and practical skills required to develop creative solutions to abstract problems	exercise management and supervision in contexts of work or study activities where there is unpredictable change; review and develop performance of self and others	(UK) HNC, HND, Foundation Degree, RQF levels 4 & 5, Certificate of Higher Education, Diploma of Higher Education, Scottish Advanced Higher, (Austria) HTL, (Italy) Diploma ITS, (France) BTS, Classe préparatoire aux grandes écoles, BUT, (Poland) Szkoła policealna
Level 6 (Note: The descriptor for the first cycle in the Framework for Qualifications of the European Higher Education Area agreed by the ministers responsible for higher education at their meeting in Bergen in May 2005 in the framework of the Bologna process corresponds to the learning outcomes for EQF level 6.)	Advanced knowledge of a field of work or study, involving a critical understanding of theories and principles	advanced skills, demonstrating mastery and innovation, required to solve complex and unpredictable problems in a specialised field of work or study	manage complex technical or professional activities or projects, taking responsibility for decision-making in unpredictable work or study contexts; take responsibility for managing professional development of individuals and groups	(UK) Bachelor's degree with honours, Bachelor's degree without honours, RQF level 6, Graduate Certificate, Graduate Diploma; (Germany) Vocational university German State-certified Engineer, Business Manager and Designer (Fachhochschule) Bachelor, German Fachwirt / Fachkaufmann, German Operative Professional, German Meister; (Spain) Diplomado or Grado; (Italy) Laurea (France) Licence
Level 7 (Note: The descriptor for the second cycle in the Framework for Qualifications of the European Higher Education Area agreed by the ministers responsible for higher education at their meeting in Bergen in May 2005 in the framework of the Bologna process corresponds to the learning outcomes for EQF level 7.)	Highly specialised knowledge, some of which is at the forefront of knowledge in a field of work or study, as the basis for original thinking and/or research Critical awareness of knowledge issues in a field and at the interface between different fields	specialised problem-solving skills required in research and/or innovation in order to develop new knowledge and procedures and to integrate knowledge from different fields	manage and transform work or study contexts that are complex, unpredictable and require new strategic approaches; take responsibility for contributing to professional knowledge and practice and/or for reviewing the strategic performance of teams	(UK) Master's degree, Postgraduate Certificate, Postgraduate Diploma, RQF level 7; (Germany) Vocational university (Fachhochschule) Master's, Geprüfter Betriebswirt (IHK) (Certified Business Administrator); (Italy) Laurea Magistrale, Laurea vecchio ordinamento, Master universitario di primo livello; (Spain) Licenciado or Máster; (Portugal) Mestrado; (Greece) AUA Diploma, NTUA Diploma (France) Master
Level 8 (Note: The descriptor for the third cycle in the Framework for Qualifications of the European Higher Education Area agreed by the ministers responsible for higher education at their meeting in Bergen in May 2005 in the framework of the Bologna process corresponds to the learning outcomes for EQF level 8.)	Knowledge at the most advanced frontier of a field of work or study and at the interface between fields	the most advanced and specialised skills and techniques, including synthesis and evaluation, required to solve critical problems in research and/or innovation and to extend and redefine existing knowledge or professional practice	demonstrate substantial authority, innovation, autonomy, scholarly and professional integrity and sustained commitment to the development of new ideas or processes at the forefront of work or study contexts including research	Doctorate, PhD, Professional Doctorate, RQF level 8; (Italy) Dottorato di ricerca, Master universitario di secondo livello.

Notes to the table:

== Scope ==
The EQF applies to all types of education, training and qualifications, from school education to academic, professional and vocational. This approach shifts the focus from the traditional system which emphasises 'learning inputs', such as the length of a learning experience, or type of institution. It also encourages lifelong learning by promoting the validation of non-formal and informal learning.

This reflects a wider shift within which the EQF is acting as a catalyst for reforms. National qualifications frameworks have since been developed or updated across Europe, with national coordination points supporting the referencing of national frameworks to the EQF. In Ireland, Quality and Qualifications Ireland is the designated EQF National Coordination Point. The Irish National Framework of Qualifications is aligned with the EQF and the Framework for Qualifications of the European Higher Education Area, with an updated referencing report completed in 2020.

At present, an enterprise in France may hesitate to recruit a job applicant from, say, Sweden, because it does not understand the level of the qualifications presented by the Swedish candidate. But once the EQF is fully implemented, a Swedish person's certificates will bear a reference to an EQF reference level. The French authorities will have already decided where their own national certificates in the field concerned lie, so the French enterprise would use the EQF reference to get a better idea of how the Swedish qualification compares to French qualifications.

== See also ==
- International Standard Classification of Education (ISCED) for a similar international level system
