= 2026 Oldham Council election =

2026 English local government election

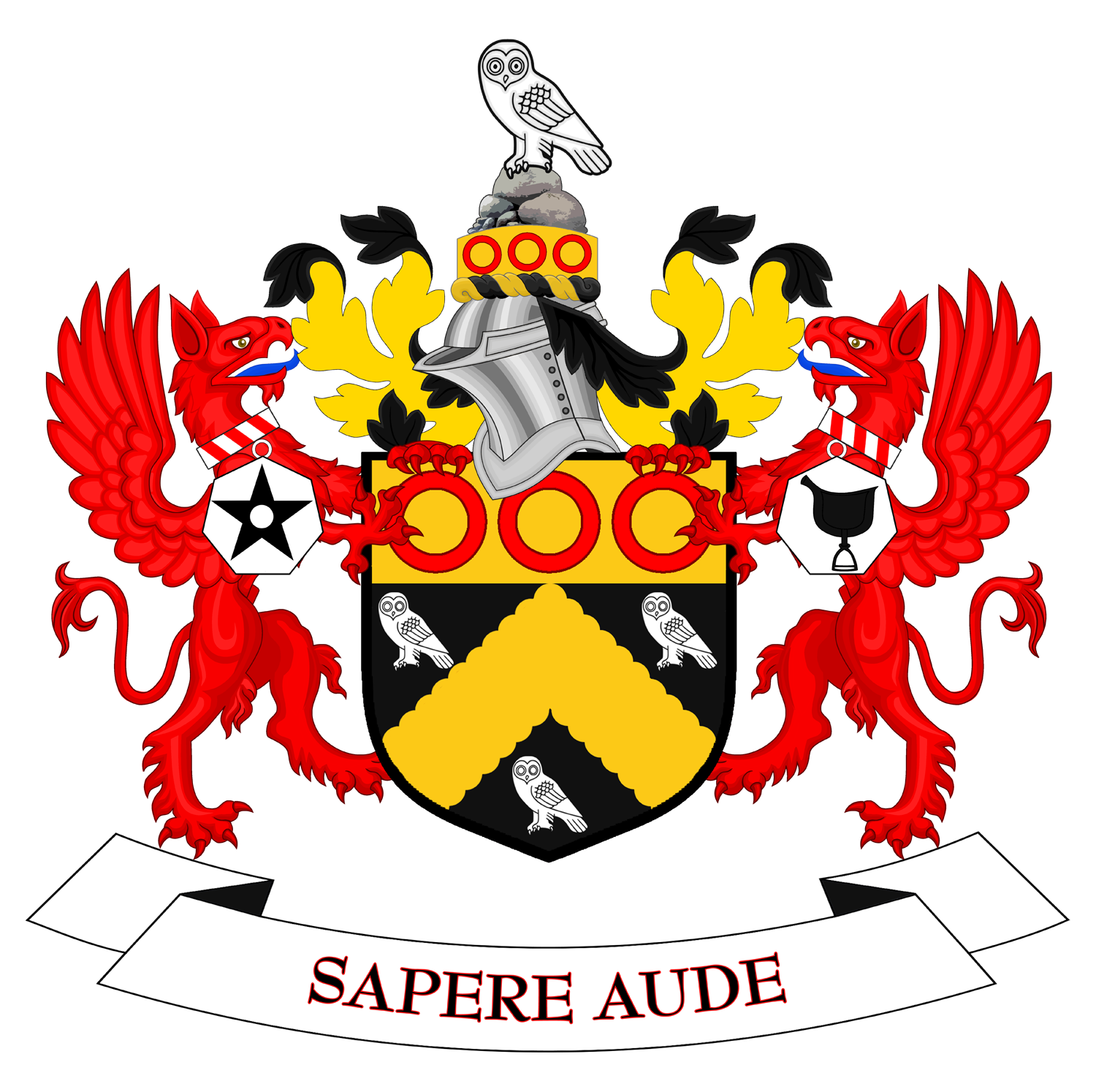
- 7 May 2026

20 out of 60 seats to Oldham Council 31 seats needed for a majority
- Turnout: 46.6%
	First party	Second party	Third party
Leader	Arooj Shah	Lewis Quigg	Kamran Ghafoor
Party	Labour	Reform	Oldham Group
Last election	27 seats, 29.1%	0 seats, 1.1%	Did not exist
Seats before	27	3	9
Seats won	3	13	2
Seats after	18	16	10
Seat change	▼8	▲13	▲1
Popular vote	16,389	29,416	8,610
Percentage	20.7%	37.2%	10.9%
Swing	▼8.4%	▲36.1%	N/A
	Fourth party	Fifth party	Sixth party
Leader	Howard Sykes		Max Woodvine
Party	Liberal Democrats	Independent	Conservative
Last election	9 seats, 16.6%	16 seats, 38.6%	8 seats, 13.1%
Seats before	9	5	6
Seats won	1	1	0
Seats after	6	5	4
Seat change	▼3	Steady	▼2
Popular vote	8,582	4,819	2,964
Percentage	10.9%	6.1%	3.7%
Swing	▼3.3%	▼32.3%	▼9.4%
	Seventh party
Leader	Brian Hobin
Party	FIP
Last election	6 seats, 1.7%
Seats before	2
Seats won	0
Seats after	1
Seat change	▼1
Popular vote	635
Percentage	0.8%
Swing	▼0.9%
- Winner of each seat at the 2026 Oldham Metropolitan Borough Council election.
Leader before election
Arooj Shah
Labour
No overall control (Note: Labour minority.)
Leader after election
TBD
No overall control

The 2026 Oldham Council election took place on Thursday 7 May 2026, alongside other local elections in the United Kingdom. One third of the 60 members of Oldham Council in Greater Manchester were contested.

Prior to the election, the council was under no overall control. Labour were the largest party and ran the council as a minority administration. At this election, Reform UK won 13 of the 20 seats being contested, making them the second largest party. Labour lost 8 seats but remained the largest party. The Oldham Group, a local party which had been formed in August 2025, became the third largest party, with ten seats. After the election, the incumbent Labour leader of the council, Arooj Shah, stood down. In the months after the election, a number of attempts were made to appoint a replacement leader of the council, but without success. Eventually, interim leadership arrangements were put in place in September 2026 where the different groups on the council took responsibility for leading on particular areas of policy rather than the council having a single appointed leader. These arrangements were said to be interim whilst work continued towards a political resolution which would allow for the appointment of a new leader of the council and cabinet.

== Background ==
Labour have traditionally formed the administration of Oldham Council. From its creation in 1973 to 2024, Labour have formed majority administrations apart from the periods between 1994 and 1995, 2000 and 2003 (when the Liberal Democrats became the largest single party), and 2007 and 2011 (having again been overtaken by the Liberal Democrats).

The 2024 election saw Labour lose four seats, and with it their majority on the council. Two independent councillors (both part of the Independent Group on the council) supported the incumbent Labour leader Arooj Shah in a confidence vote, allowing the Labour administration to continue as a minority. Two other groupings of independents existed following the election; the Oldham Group (consisting of ex-Conservatives and anti-Labour independents) and the Royton Independents (consisting of the two independent councillors for Royton South). The Oldham Group has since registered as a political party.

New ward boundaries were used for the 2023 election – this election was for the councillors who placed second in each of the twenty three-member wards. Labour defended eleven seats, the Liberal Democrats defended four, the Conservatives defended three, the Failsworth Independent Party defended one, and an independent candidate defended one.

== Council composition ==
After 2024 election		Before 2026 election		After 2026 election	
Party	Seats	Party	Seats	Party	Seats
Labour	27	Labour	26	Labour	18
Reform	0	Reform	3	Reform	16
Oldham Group	N/A	Oldham Group	9	Oldham Group	10
Liberal Democrats	9	Liberal Democrats	9	Liberal Democrats	6
Conservative	8	Conservative	6	Conservative	4
FIP	2	FIP	2	FIP	1
Independent	14	Independent	5	Independent	5

Changes 2024–2026:

- January 2025: Graham Sheldon (Conservative) leaves party to sit as an independent
- August 2025: The Oldham Group Party formed – Shoab Akhtar (Independent), Zaheer Ali (Independent), Montaz Ali Azad (Independent), Naveed Chowan (Independent), Kamran Ghafoor (Independent), Nyla Ibrahim (Independent), Aisha Kouser (Independent), Graham Sheldon (Independent), and Abdul Wahid (Independent) join party
- September 2025: Sandra Ball (Independent), Lewis Quigg (Conservative), and Mark Wilkinson (Independent) join Reform
- March 2026: Marie Bashforth (Labour) leaves party to sit as an independent

== Summary ==
The election saw Reform gain 13 seats of the 20 contested, including victories against incumbents from all other parties represented on the council. Labour retained three seats and the Liberal Democrats held one (Saddleworth South). The Oldham Group lost one seat to Reform but gained two from Labour, and independent candidate Mohammed Mohib Abu Taleb gained a seat from Labour in Coldhurst.

=== Election result ===
2026 Oldham Metropolitan Borough Council election
Party	This election				Full council			This election		
Party	Candidates	Seats	Net	Seats %	Other	Total	Total %	Votes	Votes %	+/−
Labour	{{{candidates}}}	3	▼8	15.0	15	18	30.0	16,389	20.7	–8.4
Reform	{{{candidates}}}	13	▲13	65.0	3	16	26.7	29,416	37.2	+36.1
Oldham Group	{{{candidates}}}	2	▲1	10.0	8	10	16.7	8,610	10.9	N/A
Liberal Democrats	{{{candidates}}}	1	▼3	5.0	5	6	10.0	8,582	10.9	–3.3
Independent	{{{candidates}}}	1	Steady	5.0	4	5	8.3	4,819	6.1	–32.3
Conservative	{{{candidates}}}	0	▼2	0.0	4	4	6.7	2,964	3.7	–9.4
FIP	{{{candidates}}}	0	▼1	0.0	1	1	1.7	635	0.8	–0.9
Green	{{{candidates}}}	0	Steady	0.0	0	0	0.0	7,414	9.4	+7.7
Clatland National Party	{{{candidates}}}	0	Steady	0.0	0	0	0.0	153	0.2	N/A
Nation Housing Party	{{{candidates}}}	0	Steady	0.0	0	0	0.0	58	0.1	–0.2
Northern Heart	{{{candidates}}}	0	Steady	0.0	0	0	0.0	29	<0.1	–0.4

== Incumbents ==
Ward	Incumbent councillor	Party	Re-standing
Alexandra	Shaid Mushtaq	Labour	Yes
Chadderton Central	Nazrul Islam	Labour	Yes
Chadderton North	Colin McLaren	Labour	Yes
Chadderton South	Chris Goodwin	Labour	No
Coldhurst	Abdul Malik	Labour	Yes
Crompton	Louie Hamblett	Liberal Democrats	No
Failsworth East	Neil Hindle	FIP	Yes
Failsworth West	Peter Davis	Labour	Yes
Hollinwood	Abdul Wahid	Oldham Group	Yes
Medlock Vale	Junaid Hussain	Labour	Yes
Royton North	Christine Adams	Conservative	Yes
Royton South	Marie Bashforth	Independent	No
Saddleworth North	Luke Lancaster	Conservative	No
Saddleworth South	Helen Bishop	Liberal Democrats	Yes
Saddleworth West & Lees	Alicia Marland	Liberal Democrats	Yes
Shaw	Howard Sykes	Liberal Democrats	No
St James	Angela Cosgrove	Labour	Yes
St Mary's	Aftab Hussain	Labour	Yes
Waterhead	Peter Dean	Labour	No
Werneth	Fida Hussain	Labour	Yes

== Ward results ==
=== Alexandra ===
Alexandra
Party	Candidate	Votes	%	±%
Oldham Group	Shabir Hussain	1,552	42.9	N/A
Labour	Shaid Mushtaq	989	27.3	−3.2
Reform	Susan Brown	689	19.0	N/A
Green	Andrea Valencia	228	6.3	+3.2
Liberal Democrats	Martin Dinoff	85	2.3	−2.3
Independent	Carol Hardie	46	1.3	−4.0
Northern Heart	Anne Taylor	29	0.8	−2.4
Majority		563	15.6	N/A
Turnout		3,618	45.0	+6.0
Registered electors		~8,040		
Oldham Group gain from Labour				

=== Chadderton Central ===
Chadderton Central
Party	Candidate	Votes	%	±%
Labour	Nazrul Islam	1,215	31.8	−1.8
Reform	Alexander Lomas	1,015	26.6	N/A
Independent	Mohammed Razon	892	23.4	N/A
Green	Suleman Hussain	456	12.0	+6.2
Liberal Democrats	Katie Gloster	149	3.9	+1.0
Conservative	Iryna Kantorova	88	2.3	−30.7
Majority		200	5.2	+4.6
Turnout		3,815	44.7	+8.9
Registered electors		~8,535		
Labour hold				

=== Chadderton North ===
Chadderton North
Party	Candidate	Votes	%	±%
Reform	Jon Ford	2,107	52.9	N/A
Labour	Colin McLaren	948	23.8	−25.1
Green	Paul Singleton	502	12.6	N/A
Conservative	Darren Lyon	285	7.2	−22.0
Liberal Democrats	Prem Raghvani	141	3.5	−10.7
Majority		1,159	29.1	N/A
Turnout		3,983	47.3	+13.5
Registered electors		~8,426		
Reform gain from Labour				

=== Chadderton South ===
Chadderton South
Party	Candidate	Votes	%	±%
Reform	Rob Jackson	1,833	48.4	+34.0
Labour	Kyle Phythian	709	18.7	−26.6
Green	Stephanie Beverley	539	14.2	N/A
Oldham Group	Muhammad Irfan	351	9.3	N/A
Conservative	Stephen Davenport	256	6.8	−17.2
Liberal Democrats	Brian Witt	103	2.7	−2.6
Majority		1,124	29.7	N/A
Turnout		3,791	41.8	+8.0
Registered electors		~9,246		
Reform gain from Labour		Swing	▲30.3	

=== Coldhurst ===
Coldhurst
Party	Candidate	Votes	%	±%
Independent	Mohammed Taleb	1,892	41.5	N/A
Labour	Abdul Malik	1,471	32.3	+0.8
Reform	Elaine Whittingham	473	10.4	N/A
Green	Tayba Nazir	464	10.2	+7.0
Independent	Mohammed Ali	133	2.9	N/A
Liberal Democrats	Keith Pendlebury	128	2.8	−1.8
Majority		421	9.2	–14.0
Turnout		4,561	45.9	+2.5
Registered electors		~9,934		
Independent gain from Labour				

=== Crompton ===
Crompton
Party	Candidate	Votes	%	±%
Reform	Peter Hanlon	1,773	47.3	N/A
Liberal Democrats	Hazel Gloster	1,036	27.6	−16.4
Green	Chris Mills	250	6.7	N/A
Independent	Alicia Dunne	232	6.2	N/A
Labour	Latif Choudhary	227	6.1	−10.0
Conservative	Darren Lord	153	4.1	N/A
Independent	Shaun Duffy	79	2.1	N/A
Majority		737	19.7	N/A
Turnout		3,750	47.8	+13.3
Registered electors		~7,852		
Reform gain from Liberal Democrats				

=== Failsworth East ===
Failsworth East
Party	Candidate	Votes	%	±%
Reform	Andrew Brooks	2,050	58.8	N/A
Labour	Chris Goodwin	474	13.6	−19.5
FIP	Neil Hindle	430	12.3	−19.9
Green	Laurraine DeMelchor	369	10.6	N/A
Conservative	Jane Dronsfield	101	2.9	−1.8
Liberal Democrats	Barbara Beeley	60	1.7	−0.2
Majority		1,576	45.2	N/A
Turnout		3,484	44.2	+16.1
Registered electors		~7,889		
Reform gain from FIP				

=== Failsworth West ===
Failsworth West
Party	Candidate	Votes	%	±%
Reform	Mark Ruthven	1,878	55.9	N/A
Labour	Peter Davis	584	17.4	−16.2
Green	Andrew Jones	507	15.1	N/A
FIP	Natalie Parren	205	6.1	−6.6
Liberal Democrats	Roger Blackmore	95	2.8	+1.2
Conservative	Bernard Akin	88	2.6	−0.4
Majority		1,294	38.5	N/A
Turnout		3,357	42.6	+13.1
Registered electors		~7,878		
Reform gain from Labour				

=== Hollinwood ===
Hollinwood
Party	Candidate	Votes	%	±%
Reform	Robert Barnes	1,472	39.9	N/A
Labour	Saniya Abid	866	23.5	−19.9
Oldham Group	Abdul Wahid	772	20.9	N/A
Green	Callum Holt	359	9.7	+4.5
Liberal Democrats	Elizabeth Adamson	164	4.4	−0.1
National Housing Party	John Lawrence	58	1.6	−5.2
Majority		606	16.4	N/A
Turnout		3,691	41.8	+12.4
Registered electors		~8,830		
Reform gain from Oldham Group				

=== Medlock Vale ===
Medlock Vale
Party	Candidate	Votes	%	±%
Labour	Junaid Hussain	1,283	34.9	−10.0
Reform	Victor Flowers	983	26.8	N/A
Oldham Group	Sharoon Zaman	777	21.2	N/A
Green	Cameron Gates	432	11.8	N/A
Liberal Democrats	Shona Farnworth	198	5.4	−4.4
Majority		300	8.1	–4.5
Turnout		3,673	40.5	+4.8
Registered electors		~9,076		
Labour hold				

=== Royton North ===
Royton North
Party	Candidate	Votes	%	±%
Reform	Paul Robinson	2,502	59.0	N/A
Labour	Clint Phythian	586	13.8	−22.0
Conservative	Christine Adams	569	13.4	−36.9
Green	Emily Walker	412	9.7	+1.7
Liberal Democrats	Lewis Farnworth	169	4.0	−2.0
Majority		1,916	45.2	N/A
Turnout		4,238	50.1	+15.9
Registered electors		~5,452		
Reform gain from Conservative				

=== Royton South ===
Royton South
Party	Candidate	Votes	%	±%
Reform	Tony Pinder	1,922	55.1	N/A
Labour	Kathryn England	645	18.5	−18.3
Green	Miranda Meadowcroft	368	10.5	+4.2
Conservative	William Ingston	267	7.7	N/A
Liberal Democrats	Lynne Thompson	144	4.1	−2.4
Independent	Anthony Prince	143	4.1	N/A
Majority		1,277	36.6	N/A
Turnout		3,489	44.8	+10.6
Registered electors		~7,788		
Reform gain from Independent				

=== Saddleworth North ===
Saddleworth North
Party	Candidate	Votes	%	±%
Reform	Ioan Williams	1,752	40.8	N/A
Liberal Democrats	Michael Powell	1,289	30.0	−11.7
Conservative	Luke Bywater	488	11.4	−9.2
Labour Co-op	Samuel Hollis	432	10.1	−15.3
Green	Chris Fielding	330	7.7	N/A
Majority		463	10.8	N/A
Turnout		4,291	54.5	+14.8
Registered electors		~7,876		
Reform gain from Conservative				

=== Saddleworth South ===
Saddleworth South
Party	Candidate	Votes	%	±%
Liberal Democrats	Helen Bishop	1,594	35.04	+11.5
Reform	Christopher McManus	1,592	35.00	N/A
Labour	Archie Duncan	602	13.2	−9.9
Conservative	David Hartington	417	9.2	−22.5
Green	George Atkinson	344	7.6	+4.3
Majority		2	0.04	N/A
Turnout		4,549	54.8	+13.2
Registered electors		~8,306		
Liberal Democrats hold				

=== Saddleworth West and Lees ===
Saddleworth West and Lees
Party	Candidate	Votes	%	±%
Reform	Peter Klonowski	1,808	44.1	N/A
Liberal Democrats	Alicia Marland	1,636	39.9	−15.6
Labour	Dave Barter	279	6.8	−9.4
Green	Joe Bardsley	238	5.8	N/A
Conservative	Lisa Hartington	143	3.5	−1.4
Majority		172	4.2	–27.9
Turnout		4,104	49.4	+14.3
Registered electors		~8,303		
Reform gain from Liberal Democrats				

=== Shaw ===
Shaw
Party	Candidate	Votes	%	±%
Reform	Steve Eyre	1,555	44.4	N/A
Liberal Democrats	Tom Penketh	955	27.3	−12.7
Labour	Hamid Ali	336	9.6	−5.2
Green	Ben Ingham	253	7.2	N/A
Independent	Sarah Howarth	177	5.1	N/A
Independent	Lee Navesey	175	5.0	N/A
Conservative	Adi Kohli	53	1.5	−1.7
Majority		600	17.1	N/A
Turnout		3,504	47.1	+14.4
Registered electors		~7,438		
Reform gain from Liberal Democrats				

=== St James' ===
St James'
Party	Candidate	Votes	%	±%
Reform	Gary Tarbuck	1,938	60.8	N/A
Labour	Angela Cosgrove	576	18.1	−18.2
Green	Amir Jhandad	284	8.9	N/A
Conservative	Tom Noble	209	6.6	−23.5
Liberal Democrats	Roger Hindle	158	5.0	−2.1
Oldham Group	Maqsood Hussain	22	0.7	N/A
Majority		1,362	42.7	N/A
Turnout		3,187	39.5	+13.1
Registered electors		~8,066		
Reform gain from Labour				

=== St Mary's ===
St Mary's
Party	Candidate	Votes	%	±%
Oldham Group	Sonny Arstan	2,554	53.0	N/A
Labour	Aftab Hussain	1,465	30.4	−2.5
Reform	Ivan Burnley-Davies	368	7.6	N/A
Green	Lina Valencia	321	6.7	N/A
Liberal Democrats	Joe Gloster	110	2.3	−0.6
Majority		1,089	22.6	N/A
Turnout		4,818	51.5	+3.3
Registered electors		~9,359		
Oldham Group gain from Labour				

=== Waterhead ===
Waterhead
Party	Candidate	Votes	%	±%
Reform	Paul Taylor	1,459	34.4	+25.5
Oldham Group	Mir Ajawat	980	23.1	N/A
Labour	Ali Salamat	954	22.5	−5.4
Green	Andrew Sinclair	394	9.3	N/A
Liberal Democrats	Alison Bishop	266	6.3	−3.2
Independent	Stuart Allsopp	132	3.1	−3.3
Independent	Majid Khan	54	1.3	N/A
Majority		479	11.3	N/A
Turnout		4,239	46.1	+10.8
Registered electors		~9,197		
Reform gain from Labour				

=== Werneth ===
Werneth
Party	Candidate	Votes	%	±%
Labour	Fida Hussain	1,748	35.5	N/A
Oldham Group	Rangzib Nazir	1,602	32.5	N/A
Independent	Mohammed Ali	864	17.5	N/A
Green	Mycul Trelore	364	7.4	N/A
Reform	Stuart Illingworth	247	5.0	N/A
Liberal Democrats	Rachel Pendlebury	102	2.1	−3.3
Majority		146	3.0	N/A
Turnout		4,927	51.3	+5.7
Registered electors		~9,608		
Labour hold				

== Post-election changes ==
=== Failsworth West by-election ===
Failsworth West by-election: 12 November 2026 Resignation of Mark Wilkinson (Reform UK)
Party	Candidate	Votes	%	±%
Reform	Chris Baddeley	642	41.5	−14.4
Labour Co-op	Peter Davis	600	38.8	+21.4
Restore	Rob Gunn	175	11.3	N/A
Green	Andrew Jones	60	3.9	−11.2
Conservative	Stephen Davenport	51	3.3	+0.7
Liberal Democrats	Lynne Thompson	19	1.2	−1.6
Majority		42	2.7	−35.8
Turnout		1,547	19.7	−22.9
Reform hold		Swing		

=== Royton North by-election ===
Royton North by-election: 10 December 2026
Party	Candidate	Votes	%	±%
Conservative	Christine Adams			
Green	Stephanie Beverley			
Labour	Mike Gill			
Restore	Ian Lomas			
Reform	Patrick Maher			
Liberal Democrats	Keith Pendlebury			
Majority				
Turnout				
		Swing		
