= Proud of Oldham and Saddleworth =

Defunct political party in Oldham, Greater Manchester

- Abbreviation: POAS
- Leader: Simon Hodgson
- Treasurer: Chris Gibson
- Nominating Officer: Paul Stevenson
- Founder: Paul Errock
- Founded: 11 November 2019
- Dissolved: 10 November 2023
- Headquarters: MEC House; 85 High Street; Lees, Oldham; Lancashire; OL4 4LY

Proud of Oldham and Saddleworth (POAS) was a localist political party in the Metropolitan Borough of Oldham, which was founded in 2019 and dissolved in 2023. The party fielded 17 candidates across 3 elections, but failed to win any seats.

== History ==
The party was officially launched on 11 November 2019, and fielded two candidates at the 2019 general election. Paul Errock stood in Oldham East and Saddleworth, who placed fifth with 1,073 votes (2.2%), and Debbie Cole in Oldham West, Chadderton and Royton, who came sixth with 533 votes (1.2%).

At the 2021 local elections, the party contested eight seats, polling 4,087 votes (6.6%), and placing second in several wards, but were unsuccessful in electing a candidate. The party claimed to have "15,000 plus supporters".

In October 2021, it was reported that local activist Raja Miah, a prominent supporter of POAS, had fallen out with Paul Errock and left the party. In March 2022, a report by Hope not Hate stated that 'hyperlocal' parties in Oldham, including POAS and the Failsworth Independent Party (FIP), had been inciting hatred against local councillors, by disseminating far-right claims, related to Miah. Errock responded by stating that offensive comments on POAS social media were being deleted immediately.

The following year, the party announced seven candidates for the 2022 local elections. The party won 4,092 votes (7.2%), and once again placed second in several wards whilst failing to elect a candidate.

At the 2023 local elections, it fielded no candidates. The party was statutorily deregistered on 10 November 2023. Errock stood as an independent candidate in Oldham East and Saddleworth at the 2024 general election, and placed seventh with 1,362 votes (3.4%).
