= 2024 Oldham Metropolitan Borough Council election =

Local election in Oldham, England

- 2 May 2024

20 out of 60 seats to Oldham Metropolitan Borough Council 31 seats needed for a majority

	First party	Second party	Third party
Leader	Arooj Shah		Howard Sykes
Party	Labour	Independent	Liberal Democrats
Last election	32 seats, 46.5%	4 seats, 14.3%	10 seats, 17.7%
Seats before	31	8	10
Seats won	7	8	3
Seats after	27	14	9
Seat change	▼4	▲6	▼1
Popular vote	17,178	22,698	8,401
Percentage	29.1%	38.4%	14.2%
Swing	▼17.4%	▲24.1%	▼3.5%
	Fourth party	Fifth party
Leader	Graham Sheldon
Party	Conservative	Failsworth Independent Party
Last election	11 seats, 17.6%	3 seats, 2.1%
Seats before	8	3
Seats won	2	0
Seats after	8	2
Seat change	Steady	▼1
Popular vote	7,731	1,005
Percentage	13.1%	1.7%
Swing	▼4.5%	▼0.4%
- Winner of each seat at the 2024 Oldham Metropolitan Borough Council election
Leader before election
Arooj Shah
Labour
Leader after election
Arooj Shah
Labour
No overall control

The 2024 Oldham Metropolitan Borough Council election took place on Thursday 2 May 2024, alongside other local elections in the United Kingdom. One third of the 60 members of Oldham Council in Greater Manchester were elected. The election resulted in Labour losing overall control of the council, with a net loss of 4 seats. Despite this, Labour maintains the largest share of seats, with 27 of the 60 councillors, and managed to form a minority administration after the election.

The local Labour Party leader, Arooj Shah, denied that the conflict in Gaza was a major reason for Labour's loss, saying that "we've asked for an immediate ceasefire right from the start". Despite Shah's claim, The Guardian reported that Labour's stance on the conflict could sway many Muslim voters. This could explain Labour's poor performance in Oldham, where a quarter of the population identify as Muslim, compared to just 6.5% nationally.

Following the election, the Liberal Democrats, Conservatives and some of the other councillors attempted to remove the Labour leader and administration from office. They failed to do so by one vote, after two independents voted with Labour and three others abstained. Labour therefore continued to run the council, but as a minority administration.

== Background ==
The Labour Party have governed Oldham for most of its history. They held a majority on the council from its creation in 1973 to 1994, when they lost control against the national trend. They regained a majority the following year, but lost control to the Liberal Democrats in 2000. Labour regained control in 2003, before losing their majority in 2006. Labour again won a majority in 2011, and have formed majority administrations since then, albeit with reduced margins.

The 2023 election was the first election on the current ward boundaries; as a result, all seats were up for election. Labour won 32 seats with 46.5% of the vote, the Liberal Democrats won 10 with 17.7%, the Conservatives won 11 with 17.6%, the Failsworth Independent Party won 3 with 2.1%, and independents won 4 with 14.3%. The 2024 election was for seats held by councillors elected by the smallest number of votes in each ward; Labour held 12 seats, the Liberal Democrats held 4, the Conservatives held 3, and the Failsworth Independent Party held 1.

== Previous council composition ==
After 2023 election		Before 2024 election		After 2024 election	
Party	Seats	Party	Seats	Party	Seats
Labour	32	Labour	31	Labour	27
Liberal Democrats	10	Liberal Democrats	10	Liberal Democrats	9
Conservative	11	Conservative	8	Conservative	8
Failsworth Independent Party	3	Failsworth Independent Party	3	Failsworth Independent Party	2
Independent	4	Independent	8	Independent	14

Changes 2023–2024:

- November 2023: Kamran Ghafoor, Muhammad Irfan, and Abdul Wahid suspended from Conservatives (Note: Sit as part of the Oldham Group, which was not registered as a political party.)
- January 2024: Aftab Hussain (independent) joins Labour
- April 2024: Shoab Akhtar and Nyla Ibrahim leave Labour to sit as independents

== Results ==
2024 Oldham Metropolitan Borough Council election
Party	This election			Full council			This election		
Party	Seats	Net	Seats %	Other	Total	Total %	Votes	Votes %	+/−
Labour	7	▼5	35.0	20	27	45.0	17,178	29.1	–17.4
Independent	8	▲8	40.0	6	14	23.3	22,698	38.4	+24.1
Liberal Democrats	3	▼1	15.0	6	9	15.0	8,401	14.2	–3.5
Conservative	2	▼1	10.0	6	8	13.3	7,731	13.1	–4.5
Failsworth Independent Party	0	▼1	0.0	2	2	3.3	1,005	1.7	–0.4
Green	0	Steady	0.0	0	0	0.0	1,024	1.7	N/A
Reform	0	Steady	0.0	0	0	0.0	639	1.1	N/A
Northern Heart	0	Steady	0.0	0	0	0.0	212	0.4	–0.8
National Housing Party	0	Steady	0.0	0	0	0.0	173	0.3	+0.2

== Ward results ==
An asterisk denotes an incumbent councillor seeking re-election.

=== Alexandra ===
Alexandra
Party	Candidate	Votes	%	±%
Independent	Zaheer Ali	1,494	50.5	N/A
Labour	Ghazala Rana	903	30.5	−29.2
Independent	Carol Hardie	157	5.3	N/A
Liberal Democrats	Martin Dinoff	135	4.6	−6.6
Northern Heart	Anne Taylor	94	3.2	−7.1
Green	Andrea Chaverra Valencia	93	3.1	N/A
Conservative	Md Nazrul Chowdhury	84	2.8	−3.2
Majority				
Turnout		2,960	38.99	
Independent gain from Labour		Swing		

=== Chadderton Central ===
Chadderton Central
Party	Candidate	Votes	%	±%
Labour	Elaine Taylor*	954	33.6	−19.7
Conservative	Mohammed Razon	935	33.0	+6.7
Independent	Lisa Roddy	243	8.6	N/A
Independent	Irfat Shajahan	221	7.8	N/A
Independent	Peter Brown	213	7.5	N/A
Green	Daniel Clayton	165	5.8	N/A
Liberal Democrats	Malik Abdul	81	2.9	−2.7
Northern Heart	Rob Vance	25	0.9	−7.4
Majority				
Turnout		2,837	35.76	
Labour hold		Swing		

=== Chadderton North ===
Chadderton North
Party	Candidate	Votes	%	±%
Labour Co-op	Eddie Moores*	1,383	48.9	+2.3
Conservative	Moudud Ahmed	824	29.2	−8.7
Liberal Democrats	Dominic Cadman	401	14.2	+2.0
Independent	Mohammed Alam	218	7.7	N/A
Majority				
Turnout		2,826	33.81	
Labour hold		Swing		

=== Chadderton South ===
Chadderton South
Party	Candidate	Votes	%	±%
Labour	Holly Harrison*	1,127	45.3	−9.9
Conservative	Karl Bardsley	597	24.0	+7.0
Reform	Andy Clare	359	14.4	N/A
Independent	Mohammed Ali	272	10.9	N/A
Liberal Democrats	Michael Scholes	132	5.3	−6.1
Majority				
Turnout		2,487	28.1	
Labour hold		Swing		

=== Coldhurst ===
Coldhurst
Party	Candidate	Votes	%	±%
Independent	Montaz Azad	2,304	54.7	+12.9
Labour	Ruji Surjan*	1,329	31.5	−14.0
Liberal Democrats	Rachel Pendlebury	193	4.6	−1.1
Independent	Mustafa Mustak	139	3.3	+0.5
Green	Sheraz Gondal	136	3.2	N/A
Conservative	Muhammed Dara	113	2.7	−0.9
Majority				
Turnout		4,214	43.49	
Independent gain from Labour		Swing		

=== Crompton ===
Crompton
Party	Candidate	Votes	%	±%
Liberal Democrats	Diane Williamson*	1,180	44.0	+0.2
Independent	Lee Navesey	895	33.4	+3.8
Labour	David Barker	431	16.1	−3.6
Conservative	Michele Stockton	173	6.5	−6.7
Majority				
Turnout		2,679	34.41	
Liberal Democrats hold		Swing		

=== Failsworth East ===
Failsworth East
Party	Candidate	Votes	%	±%
Labour Co-op	Ken Rustidge	731	33.1	−10.3
Failsworth Independent Party	Lucia Rea*	712	32.2	−12.1
Independent	Catherine Charnock	620	28.1	N/A
Conservative	Foysal Chowdhury	104	4.7	−7.9
Liberal Democrats	Barbara Beeley	42	1.9	−9.7
Majority				
Turnout		2,209	28.07	
Labour Co-op gain from Failsworth Independent Party		Swing		

=== Failsworth West ===
Failsworth West
Party	Candidate	Votes	%	±%
Independent	Mark Wilkinson	1,104	47.9	+13.2
Labour Co-op	Kyle Phythian	774	33.6	−5.8
Failsworth Independent Party	Jane Cashinella-Vaughan	293	12.7	−6.2
Conservative	Md Mostakim Chaudhary	70	3.0	−5.8
Liberal Democrats	Lynne Thompson	37	1.6	−3.3
Independent	Majid Khan	26	1.1	N/A
Majority				
Turnout		2,304	29.46	
Independent gain from Labour		Swing		

=== Hollinwood ===
Hollinwood
Party	Candidate	Votes	%	±%
Labour	Naseem Aslam	846	33.4	−4.2
Independent	Muhammad Irfan*	812	32.1	−6.3
National Housing Party	John Lawrence	173	6.8	−1.4
Conservative	Muhammed Alom	172	6.8	−31.6
Independent	Ewan Edge	146	5.8	N/A
Independent	Ian Whitehead	139	5.5	−3.3
Green	Jason Bromley	132	5.2	N/A
Liberal Democrats	Roger Blackmore	113	4.5	−3.5
Majority				
Turnout		2,533	29.37	
Labour gain from Conservative		Swing		

=== Medlock Vale ===
Medlock Vale
Party	Candidate	Votes	%	±%
Labour Co-op	Umar Nasheen*	1,374	44.9	−18.6
Independent	Shamas Altaf	987	32.3	N/A
Liberal Democrats	Shona Farnworth	300	9.8	−0.2
Independent	Muhammad Yasir	226	7.4	N/A
Conservative	Akhtar Hussain	172	5.6	−0.2
Majority				
Turnout		3,059	35.68	
Labour hold		Swing		

=== Royton North ===
Royton North
Party	Candidate	Votes	%	±%
Conservative	Lewis Quigg*	1,458	50.3	+8.4
Labour	Clint Phythian	1,037	35.8	−1.3
Green	Miranda Meadowcroft	231	8.0	N/A
Liberal Democrats	Jeffrey Garner	174	6.0	±0.0
Majority				
Turnout		2,900	34.2	
Conservative hold		Swing		

=== Royton South ===
Royton South
Party	Candidate	Votes	%	±%
Independent	Jade Hughes	1,200	50.4	+14.3
Labour	Steven Bashforth*	877	36.8	−3.9
Liberal Democrats	Tom Penketh	155	6.5	−2.1
Green	Jim Stidworthy	151	6.3	N/A
Majority				
Turnout		2,383	31.44	
Independent gain from Labour		Swing		

=== Saddleworth North ===
Saddleworth North
Party	Candidate	Votes	%	±%
Liberal Democrats	Garth Harkness*	1,279	41.7	+6.8
Labour	Hannah Roberts	779	25.4	−3.1
Conservative	Stuart Pyefinch	630	20.6	−4.9
Independent	Christopher Marshall	376	12.3	N/A
Majority				
Turnout		3,064	39.72	
Liberal Democrats hold		Swing		

=== Saddleworth South ===
Saddleworth South
Party	Candidate	Votes	%	±%
Conservative	Max Woodvine*	1,107	31.7	−4.6
Liberal Democrats	Amy Wrigley	821	23.5	−8.0
Labour Co-op	Dominic Wall	809	23.1	−3.4
Independent	Paul Errock	642	18.4	N/A
Green	Fesl Reza-Khan	116	3.3	N/A
Majority				
Turnout		3,495	41.6	
Conservative hold		Swing		

=== Saddleworth West and Lees ===
Saddleworth West and Lees
Party	Candidate	Votes	%	±%
Liberal Democrats	Mark Kenyon*	1,603	55.5	+3.9
Independent	Paul Shilton	675	23.4	+0.5
Labour	Dave Barter	468	16.2	+0.7
Conservative	Mujibur Rahman	141	4.9	+1.1
Majority				
Turnout		2,887	35.08	
Liberal Democrats hold		Swing		

=== Shaw ===
Shaw
Party	Candidate	Votes	%	±%
Independent	Lisa Navesey	1,011	42.1	+4.7
Liberal Democrats	Hazel Gloster*	961	40.0	+1.0
Labour	Stephen Hewitt	356	14.8	−1.5
Conservative	Md Yahhia Qurashi	76	3.2	+0.3
Majority		50		
Turnout		2,404	32.66	
Independent gain from Liberal Democrats		Swing		

=== St James' ===
St James'
Party	Candidate	Votes	%	±%
Labour Co-op	Josh Charters*	757	36.3	+1.7
Conservative	Christopher McManus	628	30.1	−2.9
Independent	Amoy Lindo	554	26.5	+2.2
Liberal Democrats	Roger Hindle	149	7.1	+1.6
Majority		129	6.2	
Turnout		2,088	26.35	
Labour Co-op hold		Swing		

=== St Mary's ===
St Mary's
Party	Candidate	Votes	%	±%
Independent	Aisha Kouser	2,769	66.7	+27.7
Labour	Ali Aqeel Salamat*	1,367	32.9	−12.4
Liberal Democrats	Mohammed Hussain	120	2.9	−2.0
Conservative	Khaled Ahmed	104	2.5	−0.8
Majority				
Turnout		4,152	48.20	
Independent gain from Labour		Swing		

=== Waterhead ===
Waterhead
Party	Candidate	Votes	%	±%
Independent	Naveed Chowhan	1,221	38.9	N/A
Labour Co-op	Ros Birch*	876	27.9	−17.8
Liberal Democrats	Joe Beeston	298	9.5	−4.9
Reform	Jack Davies	280	8.9	N/A
Independent	Stuart Allsopp	201	6.4	−6.2
Conservative	Ruhid Chowdhury	168	5.4	−25.6
Northern Heart	Paul Taylor	93	3.0	−9.0
Majority				
Turnout		3,137	35.31	
Independent gain from Labour		Swing		

=== Werneth ===
Werneth
Party	Candidate	Votes	%	±%
Independent	Nyla Ibrahim*	2,362	55.8	+0.6
Independent	Amjad Ali	1,471	34.7	N/A
Liberal Democrats	Hamza Uddin	227	5.4	−29.0
Conservative	Mohammed Miah	175	4.1	−5.5
Majority				
Turnout		4,235	45.62	
Independent gain from Labour		Swing		
