= 2022 Oldham Metropolitan Borough Council election =

2022 local election in Oldham

2022 Oldham Council election
- 5 May 2022

20 of 60 seats on Oldham Metropolitan Borough Council 31 seats needed for a majority
	First party	Second party	Third party
Leader	Arooj Shah	Graham Sheldon	Howard Sykes
Party	Labour	Conservative	Liberal Democrats
Last election	40 seats, 39.5%	8 seats, 23.9%	8 seats, 11.0%
Seats won	35 seats	9 seats	9 seats
Seat change	▼5 seats	▲1 seat	▲1 seat
	Fourth party	Fifth party
Party	Failsworth Independent Party	Independent
Seats won	5 seats	2 seats
- Map of the results, including the by-election in Medlock Vale
council control before election
Labour
Subsequent council control
Labour

The 2022 Oldham Metropolitan Borough Council election took place on 5 May 2022. One third—20 out of 60—of councillors on Oldham Council was elected. The election took place alongside other local elections across the United Kingdom.

In the previous council election in 2021, the Labour Party maintained its control of the council, holding 40 of the council's 60 seats. The Conservative Party and the Liberal Democrats held eight seats each, and various independents held the remaining four.

Labour maintained their majority on the council, but lost five of their seats to a total of thirty-five members.

== Background ==
=== History ===
Result of the 2021 council election

The Local Government Act 1972 created a two-tier system of metropolitan counties and districts covering Greater Manchester, Merseyside, South Yorkshire, Tyne and Wear, the West Midlands, and West Yorkshire starting in 1974. Oldham was a district of the Greater Manchester metropolitan county. The Local Government Act 1985 abolished the metropolitan counties, with metropolitan districts taking on most of their powers as metropolitan boroughs. The Greater Manchester Combined Authority was created in 2011 and began electing the mayor of Greater Manchester from 2017, which was given strategic powers covering a region coterminous with the former Greater Manchester metropolitan county.

Since its formation, Oldham Council has typically been under Labour control or no overall control, with a period of Conservative control from 1978 to 1980 and Liberal Democrat control from 2000 to 2002. Labour most recently gained overall control of the council in the 2011 election. The council leader Sean Fielding lost his seat to the Failsworth Independent Party in the most recent council election in 2021, in which Labour won nine of the twenty seats up for election, with the Conservatives winning five, the Liberal Democrats winning three and the Failsworth Independent Party winning two. Fielding had challenged the council's leader Jean Stretton in May 2018, demanding more street cleaners, landlord licensing, more housing in the city centre to reduce green belt development, and better connections to other areas of Greater Manchester.

Positions up for election in 2022 were last elected in 2018. In that election, 18 Labour councillors were elected, as were two Conservatives, and two Liberal Democrats.

=== Council term ===
After Sean Fielding's defeat, the council's deputy leader Arooj Shah was elected leader. She promised to spend more on street cleaning and stronger enforcement against littering and fly tipping, as well as proposing ways to support local businesses.

The Conservative councillor Sahr Abid resigned in March 2022 citing work commitments, having been elected in 2021. A by-election will be held to fill her seat alongside the main council election.

== Electoral process ==
The council elects its councillors in thirds, with a third being up for election every year for three years, with no election in the fourth year. The election will take place by first-past-the-post voting, with wards generally being represented by three councillors, with one elected in each election year to serve a four-year term.

All registered electors (British, Irish, Commonwealth and European Union citizens) living in Oldham aged 18 or over will be entitled to vote in the election. People who live at two addresses in different councils, such as university students with different term-time and holiday addresses, are entitled to be registered for and vote in elections in both local authorities. Voting in-person at polling stations will take place from 07:00 to 22:00 on election day, and voters will be able to apply for postal votes or proxy votes in advance of the election.

== Results summary ==
2022 Oldham Metropolitan Borough Council election
Party	This election				Full council			This election		
Party	Candidates	Seats	Net	Seats %	Other	Total	Total %	Votes	Votes %	+/−
Labour	{{{candidates}}}	11	▼5	52.4	24	35	58.3	25,995	46.0	+6.5
Conservative	{{{candidates}}}	4	▲1	19.0	5	9	15.0	11,749	20.8	-3.1
Liberal Democrats	{{{candidates}}}	3	▲1	14.3	6	9	15.0	7,435	13.2	+2.2
Failsworth Independent Party	{{{candidates}}}	2	▲2	9.5	3	5	8.3	2,892	5.1	-0.1
Independent	{{{candidates}}}	1	▲1	4.8	1	2	3.3	2,646	4.7	-4.4
Proud of Oldham and Saddleworth	{{{candidates}}}	0	Steady	0.0	0	0	0.0	4,092	7.2	+0.6
Green	{{{candidates}}}	0	Steady	0.0	0	0	0.0	909	1.6	-1.2
Northern Heart	{{{candidates}}}	0	Steady	0.0	0	0	0.0	520	0.9	-0.4
National Housing Party	{{{candidates}}}	0	Steady	0.0	0	0	0.0	174	0.3	N/A
ADF	{{{candidates}}}	0	Steady	0.0	0	0	0.0	79	0.1	N/A

== Ward results ==
The results are as follows:

=== Alexandra ===
Alexandra
Party	Candidate	Votes	%	±%
Labour Co-op	Shaid Mushtaq	1,401	76.3	+6.9
Liberal Democrats	Martin Dinoff	264	14.4	+8.9
Green	Andrea Chaverra Valencia	172	9.4	+1.4
Majority		1,137	61.9	▲9.6
Turnout		1,837	24.14	
Labour hold		Swing		

=== Chadderton Central ===
Chadderton Central
Party	Candidate	Votes	%	±%
Labour	Colin McLaren	1,340	51.8	+2.8
Conservative	Sharif Miah	818	31.6	−1.3
Liberal Democrats	Barbara Beeley	153	5.9	+1.2
Northern Heart (UK) Oldham	Cath Jackson	145	5.6	−1.0
Green	Jess Mahoney	130	5.0	−1.8
Majority		522	20.2	▲4.1
Turnout			31.29	
Labour hold		Swing		

=== Chadderton North ===
Chadderton North
Party	Candidate	Votes	%	±%
Labour	Barbara Brownridge	1,546	53.1	+5.5
Conservative	Moudud Ahmed	1,027	35.3	+19.8
Green	Daniel Clayton	173	5.9	+1.7
Liberal Democrats	Katie Gloster	165	5.7	+1.9
Majority		519	17.8	▼0.9
Turnout			34.95	
Labour hold		Swing		

=== Chadderton South ===
Chadderton South
Party	Candidate	Votes	%	±%
Conservative	Robert Barnes	1,197	47.1	+6.5
Labour	Arooj Shah	1,101	43.3	−3.8
Liberal Democrats	Joe Beeston	244	9.6	+6.6
Majority		96	3.8	n/a
Turnout			31.93	
Conservative gain from Labour		Swing		

=== Coldhurst ===
Coldhurst
Party	Candidate	Votes	%	±%
Independent	Montaz Azad	2,075	48.6	+3.6
Labour	Abdul Malik	1,868	43.7	−2.8
Conservative	Michele Stockton	195	4.6	−0.3
Liberal Democrats	John Hall	132	3.1	+1.7
Majority		207	4.9	n/a
Turnout			48.15	
Independent gain from Labour		Swing		

=== Crompton ===
Crompton
Party	Candidate	Votes	%	±%
Liberal Democrats	Dave Murphy	1,353	51.0	+9.1
Conservative	Phelyp Bennett	617	23.2	−12.0
Labour	Syed Ali	377	14.2	+1.1
Proud of Oldham and Saddleworth	Chelle Moore	307	11.6	N/A
Majority		736	26.8	▲20.1
Turnout			32.85	
Liberal Democrats hold		Swing		

=== Failsworth East ===
Failsworth East
Party	Candidate	Votes	%	±%
FIP	Lucia Rea	1,502	65.0	+7.0
Labour	Marzia Babakarkhail	722	31.2	−2.6
Liberal Democrats	Lynne Thompson	88	3.8	+2.5
Majority		778	33.8	n/a
Turnout			29.93	
FIP gain from Labour				

=== Failsworth West ===
Failsworth West
Party	Candidate	Votes	%	±%
FIP	Sandra Ball	1,390	57.2	+11.1
Labour Co-op	Peter Davis	973	40.0	−0.1
Liberal Democrats	Keith Pendlebury	68	2.8	+1.8
Majority		417	17.2	n/a
Turnout			31.06	
FIP gain from Labour				

=== Hollinwood ===
Hollinwood
Party	Candidate	Votes	%	±%
Labour	Jean Stretton	1,010	58.9	+6.5
Conservative	Maqsood Hussain	313	18.3	−5.9
National Housing Party Our People First	John Lawrence	174	10.1	N/A
Liberal Democrats	Karen Barton	151	8.8	+3.7
Northern Heart (UK) Oldham	Rob Vance	67	3.9	N/A
Majority		697	40.6	▲12.4
Turnout			22.30	
Labour hold		Swing		

=== Medlock Vale ===
Medlock Vale
Party	Candidate	Votes	%	±%
Labour	Sajed Hussain	2,128	62.4	+29.5
Labour	Umar Nasheen	2,069	60.7	+27.8
Conservative	Kaiser Rehman	670	19.7	−27.9
Proud of Oldham and Saddleworth	Mark Birchall	604	17.7	+0.9
Conservative	Tuhin Rahman	343	10.1	−37.5
Liberal Democrats	Lewis Farnworth	289	8.5	+5.9
Liberal Democrats	Brian Lord	102	3.0	+0.4
Majority				
Turnout		3,409	37.40	
Labour hold				
Labour gain from Conservative				

=== Royton North ===
Royton North
Party	Candidate	Votes	%	±%
Conservative	Lewis Quigg	1,222	47.4	+4.3
Labour	Hannah Roberts	1,033	40.1	+0.3
Liberal Democrats	John Swift	152	5.9	+1.3
Green	Lina Valencia Shaw	93	3.6	N/A
ADF	Paul Goldring	79	3.1	−7.4
Majority		189	7.3	n/a
Turnout			33.96	
Conservative gain from Labour		Swing		

=== Royton South ===
Royton South
Party	Candidate	Votes	%	±%
Labour	Marie Bashforth	1,039	43.0	+1.4
Conservative	Gary Tarbuck	967	40.0	+2.7
Liberal Democrats	Jeff Garner	124	5.1	+0.6
Green	Jim Stidworthy	119	4.9	−2.4
Independent	Anthony Prince	103	4.3	+0.5
Northern Heart (UK) Oldham	Anne Fiander-Taylor	67	2.8	−2.7
Majority		72	3.0	▼1.3
Turnout			29.86	
Labour hold		Swing		

=== Saddleworth North ===
Saddleworth North
Party	Candidate	Votes	%	±%
Conservative	Pam Byrne	1,292	42.8	+7.3
Labour Co-op	Joshua Charters	867	28.7	+10.8
Proud of Oldham and Saddleworth	Gary Kershaw	527	17.5	+2.3
Liberal Democrats	Mick Scholes	334	11.1	−13.2
Majority		425	14.1	▲2.9
Turnout			39.21	
Conservative hold		Swing		

=== Saddleworth South ===
Saddleworth South
Party	Candidate	Votes	%	±%
Conservative	Chris McManus	1,196	34.6	−1.1
Labour	John Fay	819	23.7	+0.8
Liberal Democrats	Kevin Dawson	673	19.5	+3.7
Independent	Helen Bishop	468	13.5	+5.2
Proud of Oldham and Saddleworth	Simon Hodgson	302	8.7	−2.3
Majority		377	10.9	▼1.9
Turnout			42.76	
Conservative hold		Swing		

=== Saddleworth West & Lees ===
Saddleworth West & Lees
Party	Candidate	Votes	%	±%
Liberal Democrats	Alicia Marland	1,379	43.2	+13.4
Proud of Oldham and Saddleworth	Paul Shilton	1,102	34.5	+6.0
Labour	Ghazala Rana	407	12.8	−9.6
Conservative	Jonathan Ford	303	9.5	−9.8
Majority		277	8.7	n/a
Turnout			38.27	
Liberal Democrats gain from Labour		Swing		

=== Shaw ===
Shaw
Party	Candidate	Votes	%	±%
Liberal Democrats	Hazel Gloster	1,030	42.7	−5.5
Proud of Oldham and Saddleworth	Marc Hince	928	38.5	+15.3
Labour Co-op	Dion Linton	453	18.8	+2.6
Majority		102	4.2	▼20.8
Turnout			32.35	
Liberal Democrats hold		Swing		

=== St James ===
St James
Party	Candidate	Votes	%	±%
Labour	Leanne Munroe	866	39.6	+4.0
Conservative	Tom Lord	807	36.9	−7.1
Proud of Oldham and Saddleworth	Amoy Lindo Crooks	322	14.7	+2.7
Liberal Democrats	Joe Gloster	111	5.1	+0.9
Green	Roger Pakeman	82	3.7	−0.5
Majority		59	2.7	n/a
Turnout			25.66	
Labour hold		Swing		

=== St Mary's ===
St Mary's
Party	Candidate	Votes	%	±%
Labour	Ali Salamat	1,896	78.8	+37.3
Liberal Democrats	Roger Blackmore	203	8.4	+5.0
Conservative	Shefur Miah	168	7.0	+2.4
Green	Miranda Meadowcroft	140	5.8	+3.4
Majority		1,693	70.4	n/a
Turnout			27.04	
Labour hold		Swing		

=== Waterhead ===
Waterhead
Party	Candidate	Votes	%	±%
Labour Co-op	Riaz Ahmad	1,350	59.4	+9.4
Conservative	Lynne Kovacs	435	19.2	−2.4
Liberal Democrats	Linda Dawson	245	10.8	−2.4
Northern Heart (UK) Oldham	Paul Taylor	241	10.6	±0.0
Majority		915	40.2	▲11.8
Turnout			26.71	
Labour hold		Swing		

=== Werneth ===
Werneth
Party	Candidate	Votes	%	±%
Labour	Shoab Akhtar	2,730	88.5	+8.8
Conservative	Mohammad Alom	179	5.8	−6.7
Liberal Democrats	Pat Lord	175	5.7	−2.2
Majority		2,551	82.7	▲15.5
Turnout			35.41	
Labour hold		Swing		
