= 2021 Oldham Metropolitan Borough Council election =

2021 local election in England

Map showing the results of the 2021 Oldham Metropolitan Borough Council election

The 2021 Oldham Metropolitan Borough Council election took place on 6 May 2021 to elect members of Oldham Metropolitan Borough Council in England. This was on the same day as other local elections. One-third of the seats were up for election.

== Results ==
2021 Oldham Metropolitan Borough Council election
Party	This election				Full council			This election		
Party	Candidates	Seats	Net	Seats %	Other	Total	Total %	Votes	Votes %	+/−
Labour	{{{candidates}}}	9	▼6	45.0	31	40	66.7	24,646	39.5	-1.1
Conservative	{{{candidates}}}	5	▲4	25.0	3	8	13.3	14,907	23.9	+11.8
Liberal Democrats	{{{candidates}}}	3	Steady	15.0	5	8	13.3	6,843	11.0	-2.7
Failsworth Independent Party	{{{candidates}}}	2	▲2	10.0	1	3	5.0	3,237	5.2	New
Independent	{{{candidates}}}	1	Steady	5.0	0	1	1.7	5,678	9.1	-7.3
Proud of Oldham and Saddleworth	{{{candidates}}}	0	Steady	0.0	0	0	0.0	4,087	6.6	New
Green	{{{candidates}}}	0	Steady	0.0	0	0	0.0	1,768	2.8	-1.1
Northern Heart	{{{candidates}}}	0	Steady	0.0	0	0	0.0	830	1.3	New
UKIP	{{{candidates}}}	0	Steady	0.0	0	0	0.0	167	0.3	-9.7
Reform	{{{candidates}}}	0	Steady	0.0	0	0	0.0	86	0.1	New
Workers Party	{{{candidates}}}	0	Steady	0.0	0	0	0.0	83	0.1	New

== Ward results ==
=== Alexandra ===
Alexandra
Party	Candidate	Votes	%	±%
Labour	Zahid Chauhan	1,619	69.4	+11.5
Conservative	Jonathan Ford	399	17.1	+12.2
Green	Andrea Chaverra Valencia	187	8.0	N/A
Liberal Democrats	Martin Dinoff	129	5.5	−0.4
Majority		1,220	52.3	
Labour hold		Swing		

=== Chadderton Central ===
Chadderton Central
Party	Candidate	Votes	%	±%
Labour	Elaine Taylor	1,356	49.0	−1.8
Conservative	Sharif Miah	910	32.9	+18.9
Green	Jess Mahoney	188	6.8	−4.2
Northern Heart	Jack Dickenson	184	6.6	N/A
Liberal Democrats	Barbara Beeley	131	4.7	−0.8
Majority		446		
Labour hold		Swing		

=== Chadderton North ===
Chadderton North
Party	Candidate	Votes	%	±%
Labour	Mohammed Islam	1,603	47.6	+3.3
Independent	Tracy Woodward	974	28.9	−1.0
Conservative	Mohammed Jahan	521	15.5	+0.6
Green	Daniel Clayton	142	4.2	−1.8
Liberal Democrats	Katie Gloster	128	3.8	−1.1
Majority		629		
Labour hold		Swing		

=== Chadderton South ===
Chadderton South
Party	Candidate	Votes	%	±%
Labour	Chris Goodwin	1,186	47.1	−0.3
Conservative	Robert Barnes	1,022	40.6	+21.4
Northern Heart	Cath Jackson	83	3.3	N/A
Workers Party	Lisa Roddy	83	3.3	N/A
Liberal Democrats	Joe Beeston	76	3.0	−0.7
UKIP	Bernard Akin	66	2.6	−21.1
Majority		164		
Labour hold		Swing		

=== Coldhurst ===
Coldhurst
Party	Candidate	Votes	%	±%
Labour	Abdul Jabbar	2,242	46.5	+2.8
Independent	Montaz Azad	2,171	45.0	+8.4
Conservative	David Cahill	237	4.9	+1.6
Green	Jean Betteridge	104	2.2	−2.7
Liberal Democrats	Mick Scholes	67	1.4	−10.1
Majority		71	1.5	
Labour hold		Swing		

=== Crompton ===
Crompton
Party	Candidate	Votes	%	±%
Liberal Democrats	Diane Williamson	1,245	41.9	−5.3
Conservative	Lewis Quigg	1,045	35.2	+17.5
Labour	Basit Shah	390	13.1	−1.9
Northern Heart	Rob Vance	148	5.0	N/A
Green	Lina Valencia-Shaw	144	4.8	N/A
Majority		200		
Liberal Democrats hold		Swing		

=== Failsworth East ===
Failsworth East
Party	Candidate	Votes	%	±%
Failsworth Independent Party	Neil Hindle	1,765	58.0	+4.4
Labour	Liz Jacques	1,029	33.8	+0.9
Conservative	Shefur Miah	206	6.8	−4.9
Liberal Democrats	Lynne Thompson	41	1.3	−0.5
Majority		736		
FIP gain from Labour				

=== Failsworth West ===
Failsworth West
Party	Candidate	Votes	%	±%
Failsworth Independent Party	Mark Wilkinson	1,472	46.1	N/A
Labour	Sean Fielding	1,281	40.1	+3.3
Independent	Warren Bates	223	7.3	−23.3
Conservative	Jawaad Hussain	177	5.5	−2.8
Liberal Democrats	Richard Darlington	33	1.0	−1.2
Majority		191		
FIP gain from Labour				

=== Hollinwood ===
Hollinwood
Party	Candidate	Votes	%	±%
Labour	Kyle Phythian	1,036	52.4	−3.7
Conservative	Michele Stockton	478	24.2	+17.2
Proud of Oldham and Saddleworth	Ronald James	361	18.3	N/A
Liberal Democrats	Brian Lord	101	5.1	−1.6
Majority		558		
Labour hold		Swing		

=== Medlock Vale ===
Medlock Vale
Party	Candidate	Votes	%	±%
Conservative	Sahr Abid	1,845	47.6	+43.4
Labour	Ateeque Ur-Rehman	1,277	32.9	−11.5
Proud of Oldham and Saddleworth	Mark Birchall	652	16.8	N/A
Liberal Democrats	Rachel Pendlebury	102	2.6	+0.5
Majority		568		
Conservative gain from Labour		Swing		

=== Royton North ===
Royton North
Party	Candidate	Votes	%	±%
Conservative	Dave Arnott	1,213	43.1	+15.9
Labour	Mick Harwood	1,122	39.8	−3.2
Proud of Oldham and Saddleworth	Paul Goldring	295	10.5	−12.7
Liberal Democrats	Russ Gosling	130	4.6	−2.2
Reform	Colin Jones	57	2.0	N/A
Majority		91		
Conservative gain from Labour		Swing		

=== Royton South ===
Royton South
Party	Candidate	Votes	%	±%
Labour	Amanda Chadderton	1,109	41.6	−4.8
Conservative	Ian Bond	994	37.3	+24.1
Green	Jim Stidworthy	196	7.3	−1.4
Northern Heart	Anne Fiander Taylor	147	5.5	N/A
Liberal Democrats	Ken Berry	121	4.5	−2.0
UKIP	Anthony Prince	101	3.8	−21.3
Majority		115		
Labour hold		Swing		

=== Saddleworth North ===
Saddleworth North
Party	Candidate	Votes	%	±%
Conservative	Luke Lancaster	1,316	35.5	+15.5
Liberal Democrats	Garth Harkness	902	24.3	+5.1
Labour	Connor Green	663	17.9	−5.9
Proud of Oldham and Saddleworth	Gary Tarbuck	562	15.2	N/A
Green	Kathryn Banawich	235	6.3	N/A
Reform	Chris Green	29	0.8	−7.8
Majority		414		
Conservative gain from Liberal Democrats		Swing		

=== Saddleworth South ===
Saddleworth South
Party	Candidate	Votes	%	±%
Conservative	Max Woodvine	1,383	35.7	+4.4
Labour	Stephanie Shuttleworth	885	22.9	+9.2
Liberal Democrats	Kevin Dawson	612	15.8	−3.2
Proud of Oldham and Saddleworth	Simon Hodgson	425	11.0	N/A
Independent	Helen Bishop	321	8.3	−4.5
Green	Brian Banawich	244	6.3	N/A
Majority		498		
Conservative hold		Swing		

=== Saddleworth West and Lees ===
Saddleworth West and Lees
Party	Candidate	Votes	%	±%
Liberal Democrats	Mark Kenyon	975	29.8	−3.4
Proud of Oldham and Saddleworth	Paul Shilton	933	28.5	N/A
Labour	Ken Rustidge	731	22.4	−1.4
Conservative	Antony Cahill	631	19.3	+10.3
Majority		42		
Liberal Democrats gain from Labour		Swing		

=== Shaw ===
Shaw
Party	Candidate	Votes	%	±%
Liberal Democrats	Howard Sykes	1,191	48.2	−1.9
Proud of Oldham and Saddleworth	Marc Hince	574	23.2	N/A
Labour	Syed Ali	400	16.2	−2.9
Conservative	Tom Lord	305	12.3	+0.7
Majority		617		
Liberal Democrats hold		Swing		

=== St James ===
St James
Party	Candidate	Votes	%	±%
Conservative	Beth Sharp	1,042	44.0	+37.8
Labour	Cath Ball	843	35.6	+3.7
Proud of Oldham and Saddleworth	Amoy Crooks	285	12.0	+1.0
Green	Roger Pakeman	100	4.2	−0.2
Liberal Democrats	Joe Gloster	99	4.2	−22.0
Majority		199		
Conservative gain from Labour		Swing		

=== St Mary’s ===
St Mary’s
Party	Candidate	Votes	%	±%
Independent	Hussain Aftab	2,212	48.1	N/A
Labour	Imran Yousaf	1,909	41.5	−43.7
Conservative	Mujibur Rahman	214	4.6	−0.2
Liberal Democrats	Pat Lord	158	3.4	−0.9
Green	Miranda Meadowcroft	110	2.4	−3.3
Majority		303		
Independent hold		Swing		

=== Waterhead ===
Waterhead
Party	Candidate	Votes	%	±%
Labour	Ros Birch	1,260	50.0	−12.2
Conservative	Sajjad Hussain	546	21.6	+5.5
Liberal Democrats	Linda Dawson	334	13.2	−8.5
Northern Heart	Paul Taylor	268	10.6	N/A
Green	Freedom Solaiman	118	4.7	N/A
Majority		714		
Labour hold		Swing		

=== Werneth ===
Werneth
Party	Candidate	Votes	%	±%
Labour	Fida Hussain	2,705	79.7	+30.4
Conservative	Mohammod Rahman	423	12.5	−10.2
Liberal Democrats	Keith Pendlebury	268	7.9	+5.6
Majority		2,282		
Labour hold		Swing		
