= Vic Flowers =

Cricket supporter

Victor "Vic" Flowers is a cricket supporter from Oldham, England and is often referred to as the unofficial leader of the Barmy Army. He was also known as Jimmy due to bearing a resemblance to Jimmy Savile.

== Barmy Army activities ==
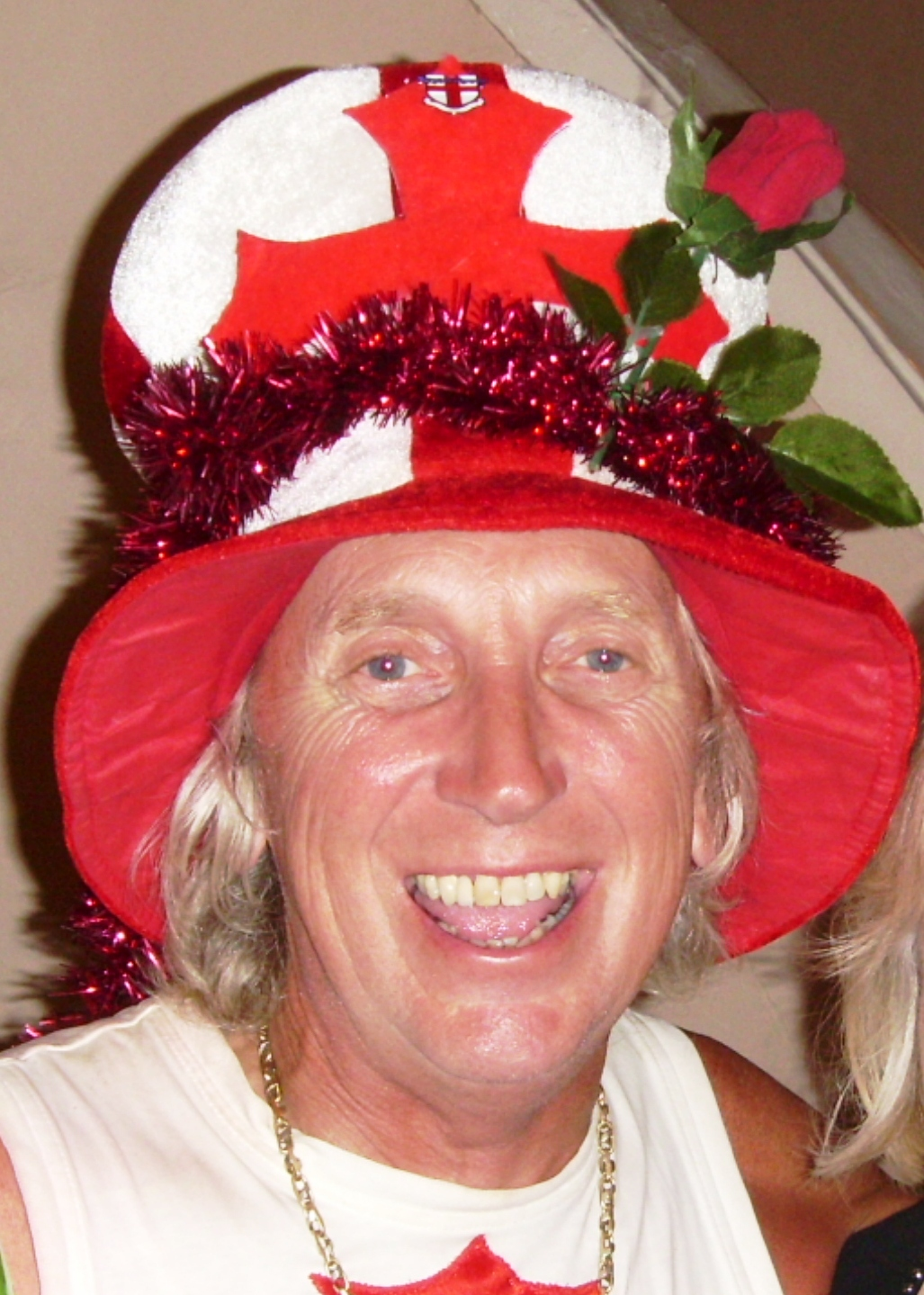
Vic Flowers

Flowers first joined the Barmy Army in 1998 after being inspired by the England supporters in Melbourne. It was also reported that he sold all of his possessions to follow England regularly. Flowers at England games is known for leading the Barmy Army in their singing. He is considered such a recognisable asset for the Barmy Army, that his travel expenses are covered by the Barmy Army. At games he usually wears a singlet and a top hat with a St. George's Cross on it. In 2006 he led criticism of Cricket Australia for their ticketing policies at the Gabba after they split up English fans and ejected Billy Cooper, the Barmy Army's trumpet player.

Flowers' actions have also led him into trouble. He was once barred from attending an Ashes match at Headingley Stadium in 2009 by the England and Wales Cricket Board but due to intervention from Yorkshire County Cricket Club Chief Executive Stewart Regan, this was overturned. In addition, later in 2009 when attending a Test match in Durban, South Africa with the Barmy Army, Flowers was attacked by two men who knocked him to the ground and then hit him with a flag. He was once ejected from the Adelaide Oval by the police during the 2010–11 Ashes series for being lifted onto fans shoulders but was permitted to re-enter later in the game after an angry reaction at his ejection from England fans.

== Personal life ==
Flowers is a Roman Catholic and has 2 children, but has not seen them for 20 years.

Flowers ran as a candidate in the 2026 Oldham Metropolitan Borough Council election for Reform UK in the Medlock Vale ward, coming second to Labour.
