= Zahid Chauhan =

English general practitioner & politician

Oldham Council Councillor for Alexandra Ward
- Incumbent
- Assumed office 2013

Personal details
- Party: Labour
- Occupation: GP, politician

Dr Zahid Chauhan OBE, FRCGP is a British general practitioner and Labour Party politician who has been councillor for Alexandra Ward on Oldham Council since 2013. He served as Mayor of Oldham from May 2023 to May 2025 when he was succeeded by Eddie Moores

== Political career ==
Dr Chauhan has been a Labour Councillor for the Alexandra Ward in Oldham since 2013.

Dr Chauhan served as Cabinet Member for Health and Social Care from 2018 - 2022.

During his tenure as Cabinet Member for Health and Social Care Dr Chauhan campaigned to invest more into mental health programmes to get people the support they need and make mental wellbeing a priority for the council with 16 programmes of work receiving funding.

In 2020, Dr Chauhan introduced 'Ground-breaking hechecks' for the people of Oldham, targeting local residents more at risk to deliver earlier intervention.

He went on to serve as the Deputy Mayor of Oldham for the municipal year of 2022 - 2023. Dr Chauhan donated his full year Deputy Mayoral allowance as a gesture to spur the Government into action to create the kind of society where no one, including hardworking low-paid workers, have to rely on donations to feed their family.

Dr Chauhan became Mayor of Oldham in May 2023 and in a departure from tradition, he pledged his full mayoral allowance to establish the "Truly Wished" fund, which awarded up to £500 to deserving residents of Oldham. The fund allowed individuals to nominate community members in need, with the final selections made by the Mayoral Committee.

In 2024, Dr Chauhan returned as Mayor of Oldham for a second term. The Mayor of Oldham pledged his entire mayoral allowance to the EIC Community Food Bank to support families facing food insecurity. This commitment, aimed at providing meals and essential supplies to those in need, was announced following his re-election for a second term in 2024

Dr Chauhan was also the Parliamentary Candidate for Cheadle in the 2019 General Election.

In 2022, the Liberal Democrats accused Dr Chauhan of failing to declare a series of payments from Oldham Council. Dr Chauhan responded to this, saying "I consider the false allegations made by the Liberal Democrats nothing but an attempt to smear my reputation. I vehemently deny any wrongdoing." Dr Chauhan was involved in a controversial incident in 2023 when he liked a tweet referring to Savid Javid as a 'coconut'. Dr Chauhan apologised for any distress caused and claimed it was an 'acknowledgment' of a tweet reply to an article he had posted earlier in the year, not an endorsement.

In May 2023, Dr Chauhan was up for election for the fourth time in the Alexandra Ward, as part of the all out elections in Oldham. Chauhan was elected with the highest number of votes being 1,462

== Charity ==
Dr Chauhan is the founder of the registered charity Homeless Friendly.

In 2019, Dr Chauhan launched the 'Food banks for GP Surgeries' Scheme, designed to help patients in need. Dr Chauhan said 'By staging a foodbank, surgeries are not only improving health but taking a lead in raising awareness of the crippling poverty many people are now living in.'

He campaigned during the COVID-19 pandemic in England to ensure that people who are homeless were vaccinated and organised clinics to vaccinate rough sleepers at high risk from the virus. Dr Chauhan considers this work vaccinating people who are homeless as a 'badge of honour' and having done the right thing to save lives.

He was named by The Big Issue as one of their Changemakers for 2021 for vaccinating people who are homeless two months before their vulnerability was recognised in government advice.

== Honours and distinctions ==
Dr Zahid Chauhan was appointed Officer of the Order of the British Empire (OBE) for his "services to people who are homeless" in the 2020 New Year Honours and was invested by Charles, Prince of Wales, on 12 March 2020.

He was also named as the Asian Business Leaders, Business Solving a Social Problem at their awards in 2018

In 2020, Dr Chauhan was listed as an Unsung GP Hero by Pulse Today for his tireless work in Practice, working out-of-hours shifts on top of remote consultations, and speaking with the media to help answer questions from the local community.

Dr Chauhan was elected to Fellowship of the College of General Practitioners in 2021.

The Northern Asian Powerlist for 2022 was revealed in October with Dr Zahid Chauhan being named as 2022's Inspiring Professional.

In October 2024, Dr Zahid Chauhan was formally recognised by a veterans group with an appreciation award to recognise his work supporting those who have previously served and continue to serve in the armed forces.

== Campaigns ==
He was the initiator of the campaign to set up a commemorative plaque at the Royal Oldham Hospital for the two nurses involved in the in vitro fertilisation of Louise Brown.

In January 2021, Dr Chauhan wrote to the Government asking them to prioritise people who are homeless to receive the COVID vaccine. This letter was signed in support by The Big Issue, Depaul, Emmaus, Crisis and Homeless Link. Dr Chauhan's campaign worked and the UK's Joint Vaccination Committee released new guidance in March 2021 saying people who are homeless should be prioritised in the rollout.

== COVID ==
A Covid Memorial Garden in Oldham, England was officially opened on 9th March 2025, as part of the National Covid-19 Day of Reflection. The event was led by Dr Chauhan, the Mayor of Oldham, who played a significant role in frontline healthcare efforts during the pandemic. Dr Chauhan, known for the first Covid-19 vaccination clinic for people experiencing homelessness, highlighted the importance of the memorial as a tribute to both the deceased and those who served during the crisis. The garden serves as a lasting reminder of the resilience of the local community and the collective efforts made during the crisis. Dr Chauhan, reflecting on the pandemic, stated: "Covid showed us how fragile our life is. It also showed us how humans are resilient. We saw how communities came together and how we looked after vulnerable people." He emphasised the need for remembrance and learning from the experiences of the pandemic.

== Research ==
Dr Chauhan was the first volunteer recruited to the Manchester Genes & Health study. He said: "British South Asians are underrepresented in research and have had terrible outcomes from the COVID pandemic. I am delighted to be the 50,000th volunteer for Genes & Health and the first for Manchester, bringing the research spotlight to health inequalities across England".

During the COVID-19 pandemic, "It became apparent early on that ethnicity could be an independent risk factor for Covid-19 and that black, Asian and minority ethnic (BAME) people were facing worse outcomes than white people." A group of GPs produced a risk tool called the Safety Assessment and Decision Scorecard to commemorate their deceased colleague Dr Saad Al-Dubbaisi. The scorecard was designed to allow GPs to decide their own risk.

In January 2021, Dr Chauhan was part of a team that developed the published guidelines "to [support] the recovery and rehabilitation of adults with confirmed or suspected COVID-19 in Greater Manchester".
