= Failsworth Independent Party =

British political party

- Abbreviation: FIP
- Leader: Brian Hobin
- Founded: 2019
- Registered: 2 September 2019
- Headquarters: 46 Brierley Avenue, Failsworth, M35 0RH
- Ideology: Localism; Non-partisan politics
- Colors: Blue
- Oldham Council: 1 / 60

Website
- failsworthindependentparty.com

The Failsworth Independent Party (FIP) is a local political party based in Failsworth, Greater Manchester, England. The party was founded in 2019 and has since been elected to Oldham Council.

== History ==
The party is led by pub landlord Brian Hobin. They supported community initiatives to help residents during the COVID-19 pandemic.

The party first contested the 2021 election for Oldham Metropolitan Borough Council. In the election the Labour leader of Oldham Council Sean Fielding was unseated by FIP candidate Mark Wilkinson. Despite this the Labour Party regained control of the council.

In 2021, charity worker Raja Miah was associated with both the Failsworth Independent Party and Proud of Oldham and Saddleworth.

In 2022, the party was named in a report published by Hope Not Hate. In 2023, the party leadership was reportedly involved in infighting after a selection dispute. Mark Wilkinson stood as independent candidate after not being selected.

In 2024, the party lost a seat in Failsworth East to Labour. In 2025, Wilkinson defected to Reform UK. In May 2025, Brian Hobin was nominated as the boroughs first independent deputy mayor. In the 2026 election, the party lost another Failsworth East seat to Reform UK.

== Policies ==
The party argued for "cash rebates" to help families in the cost-of-living crisis. In 2022, the party issued a clarification after FIP councillors accidentally "voted the wrong way" on changes to the Clean Air Zone (CAZ).

== Political representation ==
=== Current councillors ===
Name	Ward	Term begin	Term end
Brian Hobin	Failsworth East	2 May 2019	Incumbent

=== Former councillors ===
Name	Ward	Term begin	Term end
Neil Hindle	Failsworth East	6 May 2021	7 May 2026
Lucia Rea	Failsworth East	5 May 2022	2nd May, 2024

== Electoral history ==
Election	Votes	% votes	Seats
2021	3,237	5.2	3
2022	2,892	5.1	5
2023	3,096	2.1	3
2024	1,005	1.7	2
2026	635	0.8	1

== See also ==
- List of political parties in the United Kingdom
