= 2000 Oldham Metropolitan Borough Council election =

2000 UK local government election

The 2000 Oldham Council election took place on 4 May 2000 to elect members of Oldham Metropolitan Borough Council in Greater Manchester, England. One third of the council was up for election and the Liberal Democrats gained overall control of the council from the Labour Party.

After the election, the composition of the council was:

- Liberal Democrat 31
- Labour 25
- Conservative 2
- Green 2

== Campaign ==
Before the election Labour ran the council with 32 seats compared to 25 for the Liberal Democrats who were the main opposition party on the council. However the 1999 election had seen the Liberal Democrats win more votes than Labour, 42.5% compared to 38%, and they were confident of at least depriving Labour of a majority on the council in the election.

Issues in the election included crime, education, employment, health and litter. Unemployment was down at around 5%, but still above the national average and was much higher in some of the inner city areas.

In the week before the election Labour suffered a blow when a councillor, Margaret Kelly, defected to the Green Party. She had been a Labour member for 30 years, but said that the national Labour government was not what she had fought for in opposition.

== Election result ==
The results saw the Liberal Democrats gain control of the council from the Labour party. Labour, who had run the council for the previous 20 years, suffered a number of losses including the council leader John Battye in Failsworth East ward. Battye, who had been leader of the council for the previous 15 years, was defeated by 1,605 votes by a 23-year-old Liberal Democrat candidate Charles Glover in the most high-profile contest in the election.

The swing to the Liberal Democrats was over 8% since 1996, enabling them to gain control of the council for the first time. They now had an overall majority of 2, after they gained seats in Coldhurst, Hollinwood, Royton North and Royton South in addition to Failsworth East. The Liberal Democrats also regained a seat in Crompton, where the independent Liberal Democrat councillor, Michael Hambley, stood down at the election. Meanwhile, the Conservatives doubled the number of seats they held on the council to 2, after gaining a seat in Chadderton North from Labour.

The national Liberal Democrat leader, Charles Kennedy described the results in Oldham as a "fantastic result, showing the inroads that Liberal Democrats were making into Labour's heartlands". However the local Labour Member of Parliament Phil Woolas said that the election was down to local issues and had "nothing to do with the national political situation".

Following the election there were allegations of vote rigging in the election. After a police investigation, 11 people were convicted of election fraud in July 2001. They were convicted after police found evidence of voters using dead people's names to vote and impersonating other voters. The offences had taken place in the wards of the Coldhurst, St Mary's and Werneth and those convicted were both Labour and Liberal Democrat supporters. Another defendant, Liberal Democrat councillor Mohib Uddin, who had been elected in Coldhurst, was acquitted.

Oldham local election result 2000
| Party | Seats | Gains | Losses | Net gain/loss | Seats % | Votes % | Votes | +/− |
|---|---|---|---|---|---|---|---|---|
| Liberal Democrats | 12 | 6 | 0 | +6 | 60.0 | 50.6 | 27,077 | +8.1% |
| Labour | 7 | 0 | 6 | -6 | 35.0 | 32.1 | 17,191 | -5.9% |
| Conservative | 1 | 1 | 0 | +1 | 5.0 | 15.5 | 8,298 | -2.8% |
| Green | 0 | 0 | 0 | 0 | 0 | 0.8 | 433 | +0.8% |
| Independent | 0 | 0 | 0 | 0 | 0 | 0.6 | 333 | +0.6% |
| BNP | 0 | 0 | 0 | 0 | 0 | 0.4 | 229 | +0.4% |
| Ind. Lib Dem | 0 | 0 | 1 | -1 | 0 | 0 | 0 | – |

== Ward results ==
Alexandra
| Party | Candidate | Votes | % | ±% |
|---|---|---|---|---|
| Labour | Riaz Ahmad | 1,171 | 52.6 | −1.3 |
| Liberal Democrats | Angela Farrell | 629 | 28.2 | −4.1 |
| Independent | Robert Anderson | 333 | 14.9 | +14.9 |
| Green | Susannah Roney | 95 | 4.3 | +4.3 |
| Majority | | 542 | 24.3 | +2.7 |
| Turnout | | 2,228 | 31.8 | +1.8 |
| Labour hold | | Swing | | |

Chadderton Central
| Party | Candidate | Votes | % | ±% |
|---|---|---|---|---|
| Labour | Tony Brownridge | 906 | 41.9 | −9.2 |
| Conservative | Edward Bennett | 639 | 29.5 | +3.3 |
| Liberal Democrats | Joyce Mercer | 618 | 28.6 | +5.9 |
| Majority | | 267 | 12.3 | −12.6 |
| Turnout | | 2,163 | 25.9 | −0.1 |
| Labour hold | | Swing | | |

Chadderton North
| Party | Candidate | Votes | % | ±% |
|---|---|---|---|---|
| Conservative | John Curran | 1,087 | 42.3 | +3.8 |
| Labour | Leonard Quinn | 1,032 | 40.2 | −5.1 |
| Liberal Democrats | Steven Farrimond | 451 | 17.5 | +1.3 |
| Majority | | 55 | 2.1 | |
| Turnout | | 2,570 | 32.1 | +0.1 |
| Conservative gain from Labour | | Swing | | |

Chadderton South
| Party | Candidate | Votes | % | ±% |
|---|---|---|---|---|
| Labour | David Heyes | 761 | 46.0 | −16.5 |
| Liberal Democrats | Philip Renold | 450 | 27.2 | +11.1 |
| Conservative | Marie Curran | 444 | 26.8 | +5.5 |
| Majority | | 311 | 18.8 | −22.4 |
| Turnout | | 1,655 | 22.5 | −2.5 |
| Labour hold | | Swing | | |

Coldhurst
| Party | Candidate | Votes | % | ±% |
|---|---|---|---|---|
| Liberal Democrats | Mohib Uddin | 1,571 | 47.2 | +38.7 |
| Labour | Kevin Leyden | 1,337 | 40.2 | −20.0 |
| Conservative | Keith Whitehead | 421 | 12.6 | −2.6 |
| Majority | | 234 | 7.0 | |
| Turnout | | 3,329 | 42.7 | +4.6 |
| Liberal Democrats gain from Labour | | Swing | | |

Crompton
| Party | Candidate | Votes | % | ±% |
|---|---|---|---|---|
| Liberal Democrats | Philomena Dillon | 1,589 | 61.9 | +2.2 |
| Conservative | David Dunning | 615 | 23.9 | +2.8 |
| Labour | Joseph Fitzpatrick | 365 | 14.2 | −5.0 |
| Majority | | 974 | 37.9 | −0.7 |
| Turnout | | 2,569 | 30.0 | −1.9 |
| Liberal Democrats gain from Independent | | Swing | | |

Failsworth East
| Party | Candidate | Votes | % | ±% |
|---|---|---|---|---|
| Liberal Democrats | Charles Glover | 2,335 | 73.7 | +39.4 |
| Labour | John Battye | 730 | 23.1 | −42.6 |
| Conservative | Graham Drinkwater | 102 | 3.2 | +3.2 |
| Majority | | 1,605 | 50.7 | |
| Turnout | | 3,167 | 38.6 | +16.5 |
| Liberal Democrats gain from Labour | | Swing | | |

Failsworth West
| Party | Candidate | Votes | % | ±% |
|---|---|---|---|---|
| Labour | John Johnson | 1,034 | 62.1 | −12.8 |
| Liberal Democrats | David Stanton | 631 | 37.9 | +12.8 |
| Majority | | 403 | 24.2 | −25.6 |
| Turnout | | 1,665 | 22.5 | −0.2 |
| Labour hold | | Swing | | |

Hollinwood
| Party | Candidate | Votes | % | ±% |
|---|---|---|---|---|
| Liberal Democrats | Stephen Barrow | 1,367 | 58.0 | +7.4 |
| Labour | Ian Thompson | 704 | 29.9 | −19.5 |
| BNP | William Lockett | 229 | 9.7 | +9.7 |
| Green | Kevin Moores | 57 | 2.4 | +2.4 |
| Majority | | 663 | 28.1 | +26.9 |
| Turnout | | 2,357 | 36.0 | −1.3 |
| Liberal Democrats gain from Labour | | Swing | | |

Lees
| Party | Candidate | Votes | % | ±% |
|---|---|---|---|---|
| Liberal Democrats | Valerie Sedgwick | 1,346 | 54.7 | +2.5 |
| Labour | Bernard Fletcher | 837 | 34.0 | −5.6 |
| Conservative | William Lee | 278 | 11.3 | +3.1 |
| Majority | | 509 | 20.7 | +8.1 |
| Turnout | | 2,461 | 33.8 | −2.2 |
| Liberal Democrats hold | | Swing | | |

Royton North
| Party | Candidate | Votes | % | ±% |
|---|---|---|---|---|
| Liberal Democrats | Karen Evans | 2,226 | 66.6 | +41.2 |
| Labour | Tony Larkin | 760 | 22.7 | −20.7 |
| Conservative | Barbara Jackson | 358 | 10.7 | −20.4 |
| Majority | | 1,466 | 43.8 | |
| Turnout | | 3,344 | 40.2 | +11.0 |
| Liberal Democrats gain from Labour | | Swing | | |

Royton South
| Party | Candidate | Votes | % | ±% |
|---|---|---|---|---|
| Liberal Democrats | Dolores Phelan | 1,280 | 41.6 | −5.8 |
| Labour | Philip Harrison | 1,164 | 37.8 | +10.6 |
| Conservative | Joseph Farquhar | 634 | 20.6 | −4.8 |
| Majority | | 116 | 3.8 | −16.3 |
| Turnout | | 3,078 | 38.5 | +3.1 |
| Liberal Democrats gain from Labour | | Swing | | |

Saddleworth East
| Party | Candidate | Votes | % | ±% |
|---|---|---|---|---|
| Liberal Democrats | Brian Mather | 2,759 | 64.3 | +15.5 |
| Conservative | Richard Postle | 944 | 22.0 | −13.3 |
| Labour | Harold Neild | 588 | 13.7 | −2.2 |
| Majority | | 1,815 | 42.3 | +28.8 |
| Turnout | | 4,291 | 41.4 | −1.6 |
| Liberal Democrats hold | | Swing | | |

Saddleworth West
| Party | Candidate | Votes | % | ±% |
|---|---|---|---|---|
| Liberal Democrats | Christine Wheeler | 1,904 | 58.6 | +12.9 |
| Conservative | Pam Byrne | 742 | 22.8 | −5.6 |
| Labour | Jack Schofield | 602 | 18.5 | −7.4 |
| Majority | | 1,162 | 35.8 | +18.5 |
| Turnout | | 3,248 | 36.5 | +1.9 |
| Liberal Democrats hold | | Swing | | |

Shaw
| Party | Candidate | Votes | % | ±% |
|---|---|---|---|---|
| Liberal Democrats | Rod Blyth | 1,413 | 66.5 | −4.6 |
| Conservative | David Bentley | 388 | 18.3 | +6.4 |
| Labour | Gertrude Hewitt | 323 | 15.2 | −1.7 |
| Majority | | 1,025 | 48.3 | −5.9 |
| Turnout | | 2,124 | 26.6 | −1.5 |
| Liberal Democrats hold | | Swing | | |

St James
| Party | Candidate | Votes | % | ±% |
|---|---|---|---|---|
| Liberal Democrats | Roger Hindle | 1,100 | 72.3 | −7.4 |
| Labour | Norman Bennett | 299 | 19.6 | +4.2 |
| Conservative | Eileen Hulme | 123 | 8.1 | +3.3 |
| Majority | | 801 | 52.6 | −11.7 |
| Turnout | | 1,522 | 24.5 | −6.0 |
| Liberal Democrats hold | | Swing | | |

St Mary's
| Party | Candidate | Votes | % | ±% |
|---|---|---|---|---|
| Labour | Mohammed Masud | 1,607 | 50.0 | +13.3 |
| Liberal Democrats | Bronwyn Thackery | 1,327 | 41.3 | −10.2 |
| Conservative | David Atherton | 279 | 8.7 | −3.1 |
| Majority | | 280 | 8.7 | |
| Turnout | | 3,213 | 44.2 | −1.6 |
| Labour hold | | Swing | | |

St Paul's
| Party | Candidate | Votes | % | ±% |
|---|---|---|---|---|
| Labour | John Crowther | 881 | 34.1 | −0.3 |
| Conservative | John Hudson | 820 | 31.8 | −6.0 |
| Liberal Democrats | John McCann | 681 | 26.4 | −1.3 |
| Green | John Roney | 199 | 7.7 | +7.7 |
| Majority | | 61 | 2.4 | |
| Turnout | | 2,581 | 33.6 | −2.8 |
| Labour hold | | Swing | | |

Waterhead
| Party | Candidate | Votes | % | ±% |
|---|---|---|---|---|
| Liberal Democrats | Kay Knox | 2,015 | 74.7 | +3.8 |
| Labour | Christopher Jones | 472 | 17.5 | −6.2 |
| Conservative | Kenneth Middleton | 211 | 7.8 | +2.3 |
| Majority | | 1,543 | 57.2 | +10.0 |
| Turnout | | 2,698 | 29.2 | −0.9 |
| Liberal Democrats hold | | Swing | | |

Werneth
| Party | Candidate | Votes | % | ±% |
|---|---|---|---|---|
| Labour | Shaob Akhtar | 1,618 | 49.1 | +7.1 |
| Liberal Democrats | Kenneth Stocks | 1,385 | 42.0 | −8.0 |
| Conservative | Raymond Walmsley | 213 | 6.5 | +2.5 |
| Green | Peter Robbie | 82 | 2.5 | +2.5 |
| Majority | | 233 | 7.1 | |
| Turnout | | 3,298 | 44.8 | +0.5 |
| Labour hold | | Swing | | |
