= 1999 Oldham Metropolitan Borough Council election =

1999 UK local government election

The 1999 Oldham Council election took place on 6 May 1999 to elect members of Oldham Metropolitan Borough Council in Greater Manchester, England. One third of the council was up for election and the Labour Party stayed in overall control of the council.

After the election, the composition of the council was:

- Labour 33
- Liberal Democrat 26
- Conservative 1

== Election result ==
Overall turnout in the election was 32.7%.

Oldham local election result 1999
| Party | Seats | Gains | Losses | Net gain/loss | Seats % | Votes % | Votes | +/− |
|---|---|---|---|---|---|---|---|---|
| Liberal Democrats | 11 | 3 | 0 | +3 | 55.0 | 42.5 | 21,899 | |
| Labour | 8 | 0 | 3 | -3 | 40.0 | 38.0 | 19,545 | |
| Conservative | 1 | 1 | 0 | +1 | 5.0 | 18.3 | 9,438 | |
| SLD | 0 | 0 | 0 | 0 | 0 | 0.9 | 466 | |
| Socialist Labour | 0 | 0 | 0 | 0 | 0 | 0.2 | 124 | |
| Independent Labour | 0 | 0 | 1 | -1 | 0 | 0 | 0 | |

== Ward results ==
Alexandra
| Party | Candidate | Votes | % | ±% |
|---|---|---|---|---|
| Labour | Mohammed Azam | 1,148 | 53.9 | |
| Liberal Democrats | Bronwyn Thackeray | 688 | 32.3 | |
| Conservative | Sam Hill | 293 | 13.8 | |
| Majority | | 460 | 21.6 | |
| Turnout | | 2,129 | 30.0 | +6.4 |
| Labour hold | | Swing | | |

Chadderton Central
| Party | Candidate | Votes | % | ±% |
|---|---|---|---|---|
| Labour | Sid Jacobs | 1,100 | 51.1 | |
| Conservative | Edward Bennett | 564 | 26.2 | |
| Liberal Democrats | Joyce Mercer | 490 | 22.7 | |
| Majority | | 536 | 24.9 | |
| Turnout | | 2,154 | 26.0 | +1.6 |
| Labour hold | | Swing | | |

Chadderton North
| Party | Candidate | Votes | % | ±% |
|---|---|---|---|---|
| Labour | Jeremy Sutcliffe | 1,130 | 45.3 | |
| Conservative | John Curran | 959 | 38.5 | |
| Liberal Democrats | David Stanton | 405 | 16.2 | |
| Majority | | 171 | 6.9 | |
| Turnout | | 2,494 | 32.0 | +5.2 |
| Labour hold | | Swing | | |

Chadderton South
| Party | Candidate | Votes | % | ±% |
|---|---|---|---|---|
| Labour | David Jones | 1,149 | 62.5 | |
| Conservative | Marie Curran | 392 | 21.3 | |
| Liberal Democrats | Philip Renold | 296 | 16.1 | |
| Majority | | 757 | 41.2 | |
| Turnout | | 1,837 | 25.0 | +1.5 |
| Labour hold | | Swing | | |

Coldhurst
| Party | Candidate | Votes | % | ±% |
|---|---|---|---|---|
| Labour | Peter Dean | 1,746 | 60.2 | |
| SLD | Gias Choudry | 466 | 16.1 | |
| Conservative | Keith Whitehead | 442 | 15.2 | |
| Liberal Democrats | Fazal Rahim | 248 | 8.5 | |
| Majority | | 1,280 | 44.1 | |
| Turnout | | 2,902 | 38.1 | −4.3 |
| Labour hold | | Swing | | |

Crompton
| Party | Candidate | Votes | % | ±% |
|---|---|---|---|---|
| Liberal Democrats | Ann Wingate | 1,627 | 59.7 | |
| Conservative | David Dunning | 575 | 21.1 | |
| Labour | Rita Hewitt | 522 | 19.2 | |
| Majority | | 1,052 | 38.6 | |
| Turnout | | 2,724 | 31.9 | |
| Liberal Democrats hold | | Swing | | |

Failsworth East
| Party | Candidate | Votes | % | ±% |
|---|---|---|---|---|
| Labour | Judith Heyes | 1,189 | 65.7 | |
| Liberal Democrats | Charles Glover | 622 | 34.3 | |
| Majority | | 567 | 31.3 | |
| Turnout | | 1,811 | 22.1 | +0.5 |
| Labour hold | | Swing | | |

Failsworth West
| Party | Candidate | Votes | % | ±% |
|---|---|---|---|---|
| Labour | Andrew Lyon | 1,250 | 74.9 | |
| Liberal Democrats | Derrick Mather | 419 | 25.1 | |
| Majority | | 831 | 49.8 | |
| Turnout | | 1,669 | 22.7 | +0.1 |
| Labour hold | | Swing | | |

Hollinwood
| Party | Candidate | Votes | % | ±% |
|---|---|---|---|---|
| Liberal Democrats | Elaine Joynes | 1,206 | 50.6 | |
| Labour | Shirley Buckley | 1,178 | 49.4 | |
| Majority | | 28 | 1.2 | |
| Turnout | | 2,384 | 37.3 | +1.7 |
| Liberal Democrats gain from Labour | | Swing | | |

Lees
| Party | Candidate | Votes | % | ±% |
|---|---|---|---|---|
| Liberal Democrats | Veronica Clayton | 1,347 | 52.2 | |
| Labour | Hugh McDonald | 1,022 | 39.6 | |
| Conservative | Laurence Helstrip | 213 | 8.2 | |
| Majority | | 325 | 12.6 | |
| Turnout | | 2,582 | 36.0 | +1.1 |
| Liberal Democrats gain from Labour | | Swing | | |

Royton North
| Party | Candidate | Votes | % | ±% |
|---|---|---|---|---|
| Labour | Margaret Kelly | 1,067 | 43.4 | |
| Conservative | Barbara Jackson | 765 | 31.1 | |
| Liberal Democrats | Karen Evans | 625 | 25.4 | |
| Majority | | 302 | 12.3 | |
| Turnout | | 2,457 | 29.2 | +2.5 |
| Labour hold | | Swing | | |

Royton South
| Party | Candidate | Votes | % | ±% |
|---|---|---|---|---|
| Liberal Democrats | Chris Hilyer | 1,354 | 47.4 | |
| Labour | Steven Green | 778 | 27.2 | |
| Conservative | Joe Farquhar | 727 | 25.4 | |
| Majority | | 576 | 20.1 | |
| Turnout | | 2,859 | 35.4 | +7.6 |
| Liberal Democrats hold | | Swing | | |

Saddleworth East
| Party | Candidate | Votes | % | ±% |
|---|---|---|---|---|
| Liberal Democrats | Ian McInnes | 2,158 | 48.8 | |
| Conservative | John Hudson | 1,561 | 35.3 | |
| Labour | Harold Neild | 701 | 15.9 | |
| Majority | | 597 | 13.5 | |
| Turnout | | 4,420 | 43.0 | +2.4 |
| Liberal Democrats hold | | Swing | | |

Saddleworth West
| Party | Candidate | Votes | % | ±% |
|---|---|---|---|---|
| Liberal Democrats | Derek Heffernan | 1,404 | 45.7 | |
| Conservative | Neil Allsopp | 873 | 28.4 | |
| Labour | Jack Schofield | 796 | 25.9 | |
| Majority | | 531 | 17.3 | |
| Turnout | | 3,073 | 34.6 | +0.4 |
| Liberal Democrats hold | | Swing | | |

Shaw
| Party | Candidate | Votes | % | ±% |
|---|---|---|---|---|
| Liberal Democrats | Howard Sykes | 1,590 | 71.1 | |
| Labour | Ray Mallinson | 379 | 16.9 | |
| Conservative | David Atherton | 267 | 11.9 | |
| Majority | | 1,211 | 54.2 | |
| Turnout | | 2,236 | 28.1 | −2.4 |
| Liberal Democrats hold | | Swing | | |

St James
| Party | Candidate | Votes | % | ±% |
|---|---|---|---|---|
| Liberal Democrats | Jackie Stanton | 1,448 | 79.7 | |
| Labour | Abdul Shah | 280 | 15.4 | |
| Conservative | Eileen Hulme | 88 | 4.8 | |
| Majority | | 1,168 | 64.3 | |
| Turnout | | 1,816 | 30.5 | −1.7 |
| Liberal Democrats hold | | Swing | | |

St Mary's
| Party | Candidate | Votes | % | ±% |
|---|---|---|---|---|
| Liberal Democrats | Mohammed Sharif | 1,668 | 51.5 | |
| Labour | Qumar Zaman | 1,186 | 36.7 | |
| Conservative | Graham Drinkwater | 382 | 11.8 | |
| Majority | | 482 | 14.9 | |
| Turnout | | 3,236 | 45.8 | +12.6 |
| Liberal Democrats hold | | Swing | | |

St Paul's
| Party | Candidate | Votes | % | ±% |
|---|---|---|---|---|
| Conservative | Chris Shyne | 1,060 | 37.8 | |
| Labour | Shaob Akhtar | 965 | 34.4 | |
| Liberal Democrats | John McCann | 777 | 27.7 | |
| Majority | | 95 | 3.4 | |
| Turnout | | 2,802 | 36.4 | +5.2 |
| Conservative gain from Labour | | Swing | | |

Waterhead
| Party | Candidate | Votes | % | ±% |
|---|---|---|---|---|
| Liberal Democrats | John Anchor | 1,985 | 70.9 | |
| Labour | Bernard Fletcher | 663 | 23.7 | |
| Conservative | Charles Boon | 153 | 5.5 | |
| Majority | | 1,322 | 47.2 | |
| Turnout | | 2,801 | 30.8 | +0.7 |
| Liberal Democrats hold | | Swing | | |

Werneth
| Party | Candidate | Votes | % | ±% |
|---|---|---|---|---|
| Liberal Democrats | Keith Pendlebury | 1,542 | 50.0 | |
| Labour | Ateeque Ur-Rehman | 1,296 | 42.0 | |
| Socialist Labour | Jannet Parvez | 124 | 4.0 | |
| Conservative | Raymond Walmsley | 124 | 4.0 | |
| Majority | | 246 | 8.0 | |
| Turnout | | 3,086 | 44.3 | +0.7 |
| Liberal Democrats gain from Labour | | Swing | | |
