= 2023 Oldham Metropolitan Borough Council election =

2023 local election in Oldham

2023 Oldham Council election
- 4 May 2023

All 60 seats on Oldham Metropolitan Borough Council 31 seats needed for a majority
- Turnout: 35.1%

	First party	Second party	Third party
Leader	Amanda Chadderton	Graham Sheldon	Howard Sykes
Party	Labour	Conservative	Liberal Democrats
Seats before	35	9	9
Seats won	32	11	10
Seat change	▼3	▲2	▲1
	Fourth party	Fifth party
Leader	Brian Hobin
Party	FIP	Independents
Seats before	5	2
Seats won	3	4
Seat change	▼2	▲2
- Winner of each seat at the 2023 Oldham Metropolitan Borough Council election
Leader before election
Amanda Chadderton
Labour
Leader after election
Arooj Shah
Labour

The 2023 Oldham Metropolitan Borough Council elections took place on 4 May 2023 alongside other local elections across the United Kingdom. Due to boundary changes all 60 seats on Oldham Metropolitan Borough Council were contested.

Labour lost seats, including that of the leader of the council, Amanda Chadderton, but retained a majority on the council.

== Background ==
=== History ===
The Local Government Act 1972 created a two-tier system of metropolitan counties and districts covering Greater Manchester, Merseyside, South Yorkshire, Tyne and Wear, the West Midlands, and West Yorkshire starting in 1974. Oldham was a district of the Greater Manchester metropolitan county. The Local Government Act 1985 abolished the metropolitan counties, with metropolitan districts taking on most of their powers as metropolitan boroughs. The Greater Manchester Combined Authority was created in 2011 and began electing the mayor of Greater Manchester in 2017, which was given strategic powers covering a region coterminous with the former Greater Manchester metropolitan county.

Since its formation, Oldham Council has typically been under Labour control or no overall control, with a period of Conservative control from 1978–1980 and Liberal Democrat control from 2000–2002. Labour most recently gained overall control of the council in the 2011 election.

In July 2022 the Local Government Boundary Commission for England made The Oldham (Electoral Changes) Order 2022, officially abolishing all 20 existing wards and establishing 20 new wards with new boundaries. Because of this change all 60 seats on the council, three per ward, were contested.

=== Pre-election composition ===
Graph of the party split among 60 seats.
Party	Seats
Labour Party	35
Conservative Party	9
Liberal Democrats	9
Failsworth Independent Party	5
Independent	2

== Electoral process ==
The election took place using the plurality block voting system, a form of first-past-the-post voting, with each ward being represented by three councillors. The candidate with the most votes in each ward will serve a four year term ending in 2027, the second-placed candidate will serve a three year term starting in 2026 and the third-placed candidate will serve a one year term ending in 2024.

All registered electors (British, Irish, Commonwealth and European Union citizens) living in Oldham aged 18 or over were entitled to vote in the election. People who lived at two addresses in different councils, such as university students with different term-time and holiday addresses, were entitled to be registered for and vote in elections in both local authorities. Voting in-person at polling stations took place from 07:00 to 22:00 on election day, and voters were able to apply for postal votes or proxy votes in advance of the election.

== Results ==
2023 Oldham Metropolitan Borough Council election
Party	Seats	Net gain/loss	Seats %	Votes %	Votes	+/−
Labour	32	3 ▼	53.3	46.5	69,794	
Liberal Democrats	10	1 ▲	16.7	17.7	26,491	
Conservative	11	2 ▲	18.3	17.6	26,453	
Independent	4	2 ▲	6.7	14.3	21,393	
FIP	3	2 ▼	5.0	2.1	3,096	
Northern Heart	0	0		1.2	1,762	
Alliance for Democracy and Freedom	0	0		0.5	739	
National Housing Party	0	0		0.1	205	
Freedom Alliance	0	0		0.0	71	

Asterisks denote incumbent councillors seeking re-election.

=== Alexandra ===
Alexandra
Party	Candidate	Votes	%	±%
Labour Co-op	Zahid Mehmood Chauhan	1,462	65.7	
Labour Co-op	Shaid Mushtaq	1,358	61.1	
Labour Co-op	Jenny Harrison	1,327	59.7	
Liberal Democrats	Martin Alexander Dinoff	250	11.2	
Independent	Muhammad Yasir	246	11.1	
Northern Heart	Sheila Ann Brophy	230	10.3	
Liberal Democrats	Rory Thompson	225	10.1	
Conservative	Jubel Ahmed	157	7.1	
Conservative	Md Nazrul Chowdhury	134	6.0	
Majority				
Rejected ballots		13		
Turnout		2,237	30.5	
Registered electors				
Labour Co-op win (new boundaries)				
Labour Co-op win (new boundaries)				
Labour Co-op win (new boundaries)				

=== Chadderton Central ===
Chadderton Central
Party	Candidate	Votes	%	±%
Labour	Mohon Ali	1,843	61.9	
Labour	Mohammed Nazrul Islam	1,786	60.0	
Labour	Elaine Taylor	1,587	53.3	
Conservative	Mohammed Akikur Razon	781	26.3	
Conservative	Md Yahhia Qurashi	430	14.5	
Conservative	Toklis Miah	370	12.4	
Northern Heart	Cath Jackson	248	8.3	
Northern Heart	Jackie Gartside	243	8.2	
Northern Heart	Abdul Basit	184	6.2	
Liberal Democrats	Christine Cator	168	5.6	
Liberal Democrats	Sue Mayall	152	5.1	
Liberal Democrats	Fazal Rahim	82	2.8	
Majority				
Rejected ballots		14		
Turnout		2,989	38.2	
Registered electors				
Labour win (new boundaries)				
Labour win (new boundaries)				
Labour win (new boundaries)				

=== Chadderton North ===
Chadderton North
Party	Candidate	Votes	%	±%
Labour	Barbara Susan Brownridge	1,299	49.7	
Labour	Colin McLaren	1,242	47.5	
Labour	Eddie Moores	1,218	46.6	
Conservative	Karl Bardsley	1,076	41.2	
Conservative	Jonathan Ford	1,067	40.8	
Conservative	Moudud Ahmed	992	37.9	
Liberal Democrats	Dominic Cadman	318	12.2	
Liberal Democrats	Katie Gloster	203	7.8	
Liberal Democrats	Mick Scholes	165	6.3	
Majority				
Rejected ballots		5		
Turnout		2,619	31.5	
Registered electors				
Labour win (new boundaries)				
Labour win (new boundaries)				
Labour win (new boundaries)				

=== Chadderton South ===
Chadderton South
Party	Candidate	Votes	%	±%
Labour	Graham John Shuttleworth	1,228	56.9	
Labour	Chris Goodwin	1,219	56.5	
Labour	Holly Louise Harrison	1,192	55.2	
Independent	Warren Bates	529	24.5	
Conservative	Mohammed Riaj Alom	367	17.0	
Conservative	Jawed Hussain	301	13.9	
Conservative	Mohammed Liyakoth Miah	259	12.0	
Liberal Democrats	Annie Patricia Lord	246	11.4	
Liberal Democrats	Muhammad Habib	157	7.3	
Majority				
Rejected ballots		16		
Turnout		2,174	24.9	
Registered electors				
Labour win (new boundaries)				
Labour win (new boundaries)				
Labour win (new boundaries)				

=== Coldhurst ===
Coldhurst
Party	Candidate	Votes	%	±%
Labour	Abdul Jabbar	2,775	60.0	
Labour	Abdul Malik	2,255	48.7	
Labour	Ruji Sapna Surjan	2,107	45.5	
Independent	Montaz Ali Azad	1,935	41.8	
Independent	Mohammed Mohib Abu Taleb	1,275	27.6	
Independent	Noor Akmol	915	19.8	
Liberal Democrats	Badrul Amin	309	6.7	
Liberal Democrats	Rachel Pendlebury	262	5.7	
Independent	Amir Uddin	259	5.6	
Independent	Abdul Malik	214	4.6	
Independent	Mohammed Ali	181	3.9	
Conservative	Saira Ahmed	167	3.6	
Independent	Ahmed Ali	166	3.6	
Liberal Democrats	Hamza Uddin	141	3.0	
Conservative	Samsul Alam	134	2.9	
Conservative	Mahmud Ullah Hannan	132	2.9	
Independent	Mustafa Ahmed Mustak	131	2.8	
Majority				
Rejected ballots		35		
Turnout		4,662	49.7	
Registered electors				
Labour win (new boundaries)				
Labour win (new boundaries)				
Labour win (new boundaries)				

=== Crompton ===
Crompton
Party	Candidate	Votes	%	±%
Liberal Democrats	Dave Murphy	1,136	45.7	
Liberal Democrats	Louie Michael Hamblett	1,109	44.6	
Liberal Democrats	Diane Williamson	1,087	43.8	
Independent	Lee Michael Navesey	736	29.6	
Labour	David John Barker	490	19.7	
Labour	Ken Rustidge	466	18.8	
Labour	Latif Choudhary	358	14.4	
Conservative	Michele Stockton	329	13.2	
Conservative	Masuma Ahmed	200	8.1	
Conservative	Mohammed Afruj Chowdhury	196	7.9	
Majority				
Rejected ballots		16		
Turnout		2,500	32.3	
Registered electors				
Liberal Democrats win (new boundaries)				
Liberal Democrats win (new boundaries)				
Liberal Democrats win (new boundaries)				

=== Failsworth East ===
Failsworth East
Party	Candidate	Votes	%	±%
FIP	Brian Hobin	944	48.3	
FIP	Neil Hindle	877	44.9	
FIP	Lucia Theresa Rea	866	44.3	
Labour	Aileen Laura Fryer	848	43.4	
Labour	Fazlul Haque	560	28.7	
Conservative	Bradley Holt	246	12.6	
Liberal Democrats	Barbara Ann Beeley	227	11.6	
Majority				
Rejected ballots		9		
Turnout		1,963	24.8	
Registered electors				
FIP win (new boundaries)				
FIP win (new boundaries)				
FIP win (new boundaries)				

=== Failsworth West ===
Failsworth West
Party	Candidate	Votes	%	±%
Independent	Sandra Ball	1,010	46.6	
Labour Co-op	Peter Davis	929	42.9	
Labour Co-op	Paul Gordon Fryer	854	39.4	
Independent	Alan Brady	769	35.5	
Independent	Mark Jeffrey Wilkinson	751	34.7	
Labour Co-op	Dion Antony Linton	671	31.0	
FIP	Jane Nicola Cashinella-Vaughan	409	18.9	
Conservative	Andrew Hurley	191	8.8	
Liberal Democrats	Elizabeth Christine Powell	106	4.9	
Majority				
Rejected ballots		11		
Turnout		2,177	27.6	
Registered electors				
Independent win (new boundaries)				
Labour Co-op win (new boundaries)				
Labour Co-op win (new boundaries)				

=== Hollinwood ===
Hollinwood
Party	Candidate	Votes	%	±%
Conservative	Kamran Ghafoor	1,085	43.2	
Conservative	Abdul Wahid	972	38.7	
Conservative	Muhammad Irfan	964	38.4	
Labour	Hannah Jane Roberts	944	37.6	
Labour	Kyle James Phythian	924	36.8	
Labour	Steve Williams	876	34.9	
Independent	Barbara Victoria Whitehead	279	11.1	
Independent	Ian Whitehead	221	8.8	
National Housing Party	John Lawrence	205	8.2	
Liberal Democrats	Karen Barton	202	8.0	
Majority				
Rejected ballots		11		
Turnout		2,524	29.7	
Registered electors				
Conservative win (new boundaries)				
Conservative win (new boundaries)				
Conservative win (new boundaries)				

Since the elections, the three elected councillors from Hollinwood were suspended from the Conservative Party in November 2023, forming the "Oldham Group" party. This has caused the composition of the council to change in November 2023, making the Liberal Democrats the official opposition.

=== Medlock Vale ===
Medlock Vale
Party	Candidate	Votes	%	±%
Labour	Sajed Hussain	1,997	67.5	
Labour	Junaid Hussain	1,906	64.5	
Labour	Umar Nasheen	1,879	63.5	
Independent	Mark Birchall	532	18.0	
Liberal Democrats	Lewis Farnworth	301	10.2	
Liberal Democrats	Shona Farnworth	297	10.0	
Conservative	Tania Akhtar	213	7.2	
Conservative	Mohammod Wabaydur Rahman	212	7.2	
Conservative	Akthar Hussain	171	5.8	
Independent	Waqar Raza	111	3.8	
Majority				
Rejected ballots		5		
Turnout		2,962	34.5	
Registered electors				
Labour win (new boundaries)				
Labour win (new boundaries)				
Labour win (new boundaries)				

=== Royton North ===
Royton North
Party	Candidate	Votes	%	±%
Conservative	Dave Arnott	1,289	45.7	
Conservative	Christine Adams	1,255	44.5	
Conservative	Lewis Quigg	1,182	41.9	
Labour	Mick Harwood	1,142	40.5	
Labour	Clint Phythian	1,046	37.1	
Labour	Stephanie Lauren Shuttleworth	981	34.8	
Alliance for Democracy and Freedom	Colin Herbert Burrows	273	9.7	
Alliance for Democracy and Freedom	Joan Anne Mills	235	8.3	
Alliance for Democracy and Freedom	Paul Francis Goldring	231	8.2	
Liberal Democrats	Brian Lord	168	6.0	
Liberal Democrats	Enrique Flores	158	5.6	
Liberal Democrats	Keith Swift	141	5.0	
Majority				
Rejected ballots		8		
Turnout		2,831	33.4	
Registered electors				
Conservative win (new boundaries)				
Conservative win (new boundaries)				
Conservative win (new boundaries)				

=== Royton South ===
Royton South
Party	Candidate	Votes	%	±%
Independent	Maggie Hurley	1,039	44.8	
Labour	Marie Anne Bashforth	978	42.2	
Labour	Steven Bashforth	944	40.7	
Labour	Amanda Chadderton	923	39.8	
Independent	Jade Louise Hughes	837	36.1	
Independent	Darren Anthony Ratcliffe	757	32.6	
Independent	Anthony Joseph Prince	427	18.4	
Liberal Democrats	Russell John Thomas Gosling	215	9.3	
Liberal Democrats	Tom Penketh	199	8.6	
Liberal Democrats	Jeffrey Garner	148	6.4	
Freedom Alliance	Alexander Anthony Omeltschenko	71	3.1	
Majority				
Rejected ballots		12		
Turnout		2,332	31.2	
Registered electors				
Independent win (new boundaries)				
Labour win (new boundaries)				
Labour win (new boundaries)				

=== Saddleworth North ===
Saddleworth North
Party	Candidate	Votes	%	±%
Conservative	Pam Byrne	1,134	37.6	
Conservative	Luke Charles Laurence Lancaster	1,064	35.3	
Liberal Democrats	Garth Harkness	1,050	34.9	
Liberal Democrats	Lynne Christine Thompson	912	30.3	
Labour	Phillinda Ann Shipp	858	28.5	
Liberal Democrats	Michael Robert Thomas Powell	767	25.5	
Conservative	Stuart John Pyefinch	767	25.5	
Labour	Glyn Ford	733	24.3	
Independent	Gary John Kershaw	451	15.0	
Independent	Simon Hodgson	282	9.4	
Independent	Paul Geoffrey Stevenson	251	8.3	
Majority				
Rejected ballots		9		
Turnout		3,021	38.7	
Registered electors				
Conservative win (new boundaries)				
Conservative win (new boundaries)				
Liberal Democrats win (new boundaries)				

=== Saddleworth South ===
Saddleworth South
Party	Candidate	Votes	%	±%
Conservative	Graham Sheldon	1,449	44.8	
Liberal Democrats	Helen Louise Bishop	1,225	37.8	
Conservative	Max Joseph Woodvine	1,176	36.3	
Liberal Democrats	Roger Malham Blackmore	1,019	31.5	
Conservative	Christopher John McManus	997	30.8	
Labour	Dominic John Wall	858	26.5	
Labour	Tahra Parveen Javed	750	23.2	
Liberal Democrats	Joseph Darren Beeston	673	20.8	
Independent	Gary Tarbuck	663	20.5	
Majority				
Rejected ballots		9		
Turnout		3,246	40.9	
Registered electors				
Conservative win (new boundaries)				
Liberal Democrats win (new boundaries)				
Conservative win (new boundaries)				

=== Saddleworth West and Lees ===
Saddleworth West and Lees
Party	Candidate	Votes	%	±%
Liberal Democrats	Sam Al-Hamdani	1,600	55.6	
Liberal Democrats	Alicia Claire Marland	1,564	54.4	
Liberal Democrats	Mark Kenyon	1,483	51.6	
Independent	Paul Shilton	660	22.9	
Labour	Dave Barter	446	15.5	
Labour	John Bernard Battye	445	15.5	
Independent	Christopher Marshall	430	15.0	
Independent	Sophie Johnson	420	14.6	
Labour	Valerie Leach	382	13.3	
Conservative	Terence Hopkinson	192	6.7	
Conservative	Gibson Michael Walker	175	6.1	
Conservative	Mujibur Rahman	110	3.8	
Majority				
Rejected ballots		13		
Turnout		2,889	34.8	
Registered electors				
Liberal Democrats win (new boundaries)				
Liberal Democrats win (new boundaries)				
Liberal Democrats win (new boundaries)				

=== Shaw ===
Shaw
Party	Candidate	Votes	%	±%
Independent	Marc James Hince	998	42.8	
Liberal Democrats	Howard David Sykes	938	40.2	
Liberal Democrats	Hazel Gloster	911	39.0	
Liberal Democrats	Chris Gloster	895	38.3	
Independent	Lisa Adele Navesey	872	37.4	
Labour	Meg Birchall	381	16.3	
Labour	Syed Maruf Ali	297	12.7	
Labour	Dhanyaal Rashid	256	11.0	
Conservative	Mohammed Abdul Kayum	67	2.9	
Conservative	Md Mujibur Rahman	63	2.7	
Conservative	Shuabur Rahman	62	2.7	
Majority				
Rejected ballots		6		
Turnout		2,340	31.7	
Registered electors				
Independent win (new boundaries)				
Liberal Democrats win (new boundaries)				
Liberal Democrats win (new boundaries)				

=== St James' ===
St James'
Party	Candidate	Votes	%	±%
Conservative	Beth Sharp	871	40.6	
Labour	Angela Carol Cosgrove	848	39.5	
Labour	Josh Charters	743	34.6	
Labour	Leanne Joy Munroe	731	34.1	
Conservative	Jeremy Craig-Weston	709	33.0	
Conservative	Jacob Sharp	705	32.9	
Independent	Amoy Lindo	522	24.3	
Liberal Democrats	Kevin Dawson	238	11.1	
Liberal Democrats	Joe Gloster	124	5.8	
Liberal Democrats	Roger Hindle	118	5.5	
Majority				
Rejected ballots		11		
Turnout		2,157	26.4	
Registered electors				
Conservative win (new boundaries)				
Labour win (new boundaries)				
Labour win (new boundaries)				

=== St Mary's ===
St Mary's
Party	Candidate	Votes	%	±%
Labour	Arooj Shah	2,743	64.5	
Independent	Aftab Hussain	2,361	55.5	
Labour	Ali Umar Aqeel Salamat	1,926	45.3	
Independent	Aisha Kouser	1,658	39.0	
Labour	Ghazala Parveen Rana	1,336	31.4	
Liberal Democrats	Zoe Elizabeth Rowlinson	236	5.5	
Liberal Democrats	Mohammed Hussain	209	4.9	
Conservative	Maria Ahmed	141	3.3	
Conservative	Asma Begum	107	2.5	
Conservative	Husna Khatun	84	2.0	
Majority				
Rejected ballots		26		
Turnout		4,280	49.2	
Registered electors				
Labour win (new boundaries)				
Independent win (new boundaries)				
Labour win (new boundaries)				

=== Waterhead ===
Waterhead
Party	Candidate	Votes	%	±%
Labour	Nadeem Iqbal	1,448	52.8	
Labour	Peter Dean	1,304	47.5	
Labour	Ros Birch	1,253	45.7	
Conservative	Sajjad Hussain	849	31.0	
Liberal Democrats	Linda Dawson	395	14.4	
Independent	Stuart Allsopp	346	12.6	
Northern Heart	Paul Taylor	329	12.0	
Northern Heart	Anne Margaret Fiander Taylor	282	10.3	
Liberal Democrats	Richard Thomas Wild	268	9.8	
Northern Heart	Rob Vance	246	9.0	
Independent	Israk Miah	208	7.6	
Majority				
Rejected ballots		12		
Turnout		2,755	32.4	
Registered electors				
Labour win (new boundaries)				
Labour win (new boundaries)				
Labour win (new boundaries)				

=== Werneth ===
Werneth
Party	Candidate	Votes	%	±%
Labour	Shoab Akhtar	2,923	59.1	
Labour	Fida Hussain	2,788	56.4	
Labour	Nyla Ibrahim	2,731	55.2	
Liberal Democrats	Asghar Ali	1,700	34.4	
Liberal Democrats	Malik Abdul	1,496	30.2	
Conservative	Foysal Ahmed Chowdhury	476	9.6	
Liberal Democrats	Keith Pendlebury	395	8.0	
Conservative	Mohammed Salik Miah	204	4.1	
Conservative	Sobbir Ahmed Khan	179	3.6	
Majority				
Rejected ballots		27		
Turnout		4,973	54.3	
Registered electors				
Labour win (new boundaries)				
Labour win (new boundaries)				
Labour win (new boundaries)				
