= Oldham Council =

Local government body in England

Type
- Type: Metropolitan borough council

History
- Founded: 1 April 1974

Leadership
- Mayor: Pam Byrne, Conservative since 15 June 2026
- Leader: Vacant since May 2026
- Chief Executive: Shelley Kipling since 7 March 2025

Structure
- Seats: 60 councillors
- Graph of the party split among 60 seats.
- Political groups: Interim administration (50) Labour (18) Reform (16) Oldham Group (10) Liberal Democrats (6) Other parties (10) Conservative (4) Failsworth Ind. (1) Independent (5)
- Joint committees: Greater Manchester Combined Authority; Greater Manchester Police, Fire and Crime Panel
- Length of term: 4 years

Elections
- Voting system: First-past-the-post
- Last election: 7 May 2026
- Next election: 6 May 2027

Meeting place
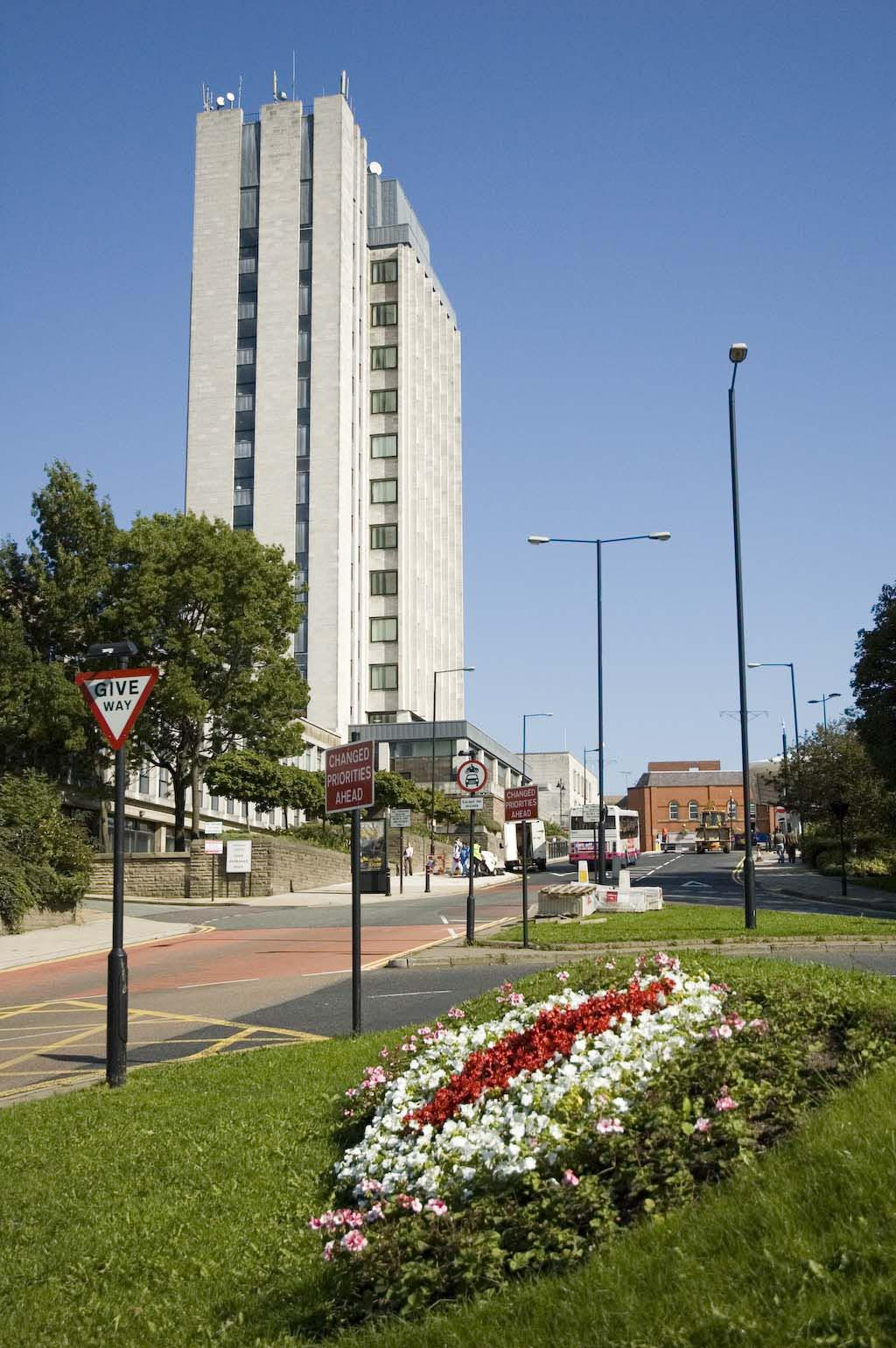
- Civic Centre, West Street

Website
- www.oldham.gov.uk

Oldham Metropolitan Borough Council, also known as Oldham Council, is the local authority of the Metropolitan Borough of Oldham in Greater Manchester, England. It is a metropolitan borough council and provides the majority of local government services in the borough. The council has been a member of the Greater Manchester Combined Authority since 2011.

The council has been under no overall control since the 2024 election. Between 2024 and 2026, the council was run by a Labour minority administration. After the 2026 election, the council has been unable to appoint a leader. A temporary power-sharing agreement was made in September, with four portfolios allocated to each of the four largest groups on the council.

The council meets at Oldham Civic Centre and has its main offices in the Spindles Town Square shopping centre.

== History ==
The town of Oldham had been governed by improvement commissioners from 1826. In 1849 the town was incorporated as a municipal borough, governed by a body formally called the 'mayor, aldermen and burgesses of the borough of Oldham', generally known as the corporation, town council or borough council. When elected county councils were established in 1889, Oldham was considered large enough for its existing council to provide county-level services, and so it was made a county borough, independent from the new Lancashire County Council, whilst remaining part of the geographical county of Lancashire.

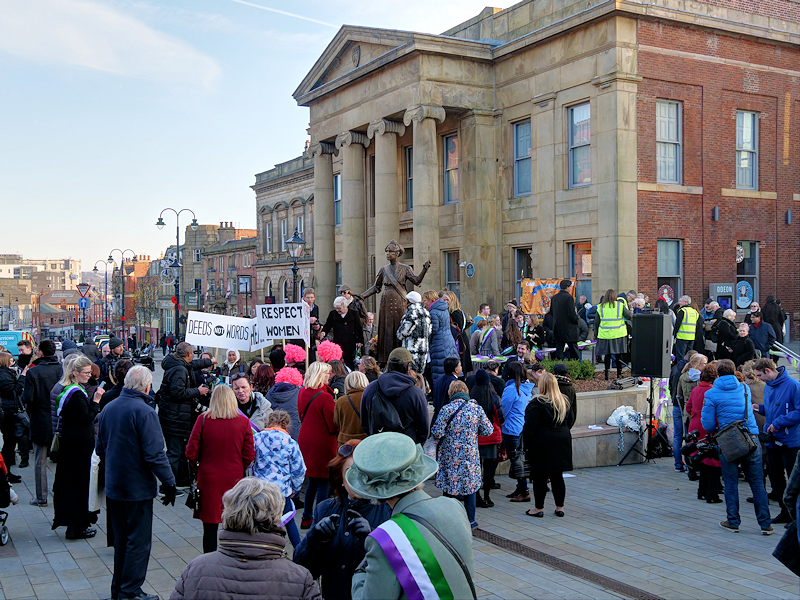
Old Town Hall: Council's headquarters until 1977

The larger Metropolitan Borough of Oldham and its council were created in 1974 under the Local Government Act 1972 as one of ten metropolitan districts within the new metropolitan county of Greater Manchester. The first election was held in 1973. For its first year the council acted as a shadow authority alongside the area's seven outgoing authorities, being the borough council of Oldham and the urban district councils of Chadderton, Crompton, Failsworth, Lees, Royton and Saddleworth (the latter was in the West Riding of Yorkshire, the others were all in Lancashire). The new metropolitan district and its council formally came into being on 1 April 1974, at which point the old districts and their councils were abolished.

The metropolitan district was awarded borough status from its creation, allowing the chair of the council to take the title of mayor, continuing Oldham's series of mayors dating back to 1849. The council styles itself Oldham Council rather than its full formal name of Oldham Metropolitan Borough Council.

From 1974 until 1986 the council was a lower-tier authority, with upper-tier functions provided by the Greater Manchester County Council. The county council was abolished in 1986 and its functions passed to Greater Manchester's ten borough councils, including Oldham, with some services provided through joint committees.

Since 2011, the council has been a member of the Greater Manchester Combined Authority, which has been led by the directly elected Mayor of Greater Manchester since 2017. The combined authority provides strategic leadership and co-ordination for certain functions across Greater Manchester, notably regarding transport and town planning, but Oldham Council continues to be responsible for most local government functions.

In 2011, Oldham declared its ambition to become a "co-operative council", aiming to find better ways of working for and with local communities. The council went on to be one of the founder members of the Co-operative Councils Independent Network, established in 2012.

Oldham Youth Council, formed in 2006, now has constitutional power on Oldham Council – a national first. The Youth Council is democratically elected every two years via a borough-wide election run in schools, colleges and youth organisations. The group now has its own section on the agenda of each meeting of Full Council at Oldham Council where it can raise and debate issues and hold councillors to account.

In 2020, Oldham Council bought the shopping centre "The Spindles" with the intent of renovating the shopping centre and local market grounds.

== Governance ==
Oldham Council provides metropolitan borough services. Some strategic functions in the area are provided by the Greater Manchester Combined Authority; the leader of Oldham Council sits on the combined authority as Oldham's representative. There are two civil parishes in the borough at Saddleworth and Shaw and Crompton, which form an additional tier of local government for their areas; the rest of the borough is unparished.

=== Political control and leadership ===
The council was under no overall control since the 2024 election, being led by a Labour minority administration. After Labour losses at the 2026 election the leader, Arooj Shah, stood down. The council was subsequently unable to appoint a mayor or a leader at its annual meeting in May 2026. With no mayor (who chairs council meetings), the council was unable to conduct any business. A meeting in June finally resulted in the appointment of a mayor, but as of September 2026 an administration has still not formed. Interim leadership arrangements were put in place in September 2026 where the different groups on the council took responsibility for leading on particular areas of policy rather than the council having a single appointed leader. These arrangements were said to be interim whilst work continued towards a political resolution which would allow for the appointment of a new leader of the council and cabinet.

Political control of the council since the 1974 reforms took effect has been as follows:

==== Control ====
Party in control	Years
Labour	1974–1976
No overall control	1976–1978
Conservative	1978–1980
Labour	1980–1994
No overall control	1994–1995
Labour	1995–2000
Liberal Democrats	2000–2002
No overall control	2002–2003
Labour	2003–2007
No overall control	2007–2011
Labour	2011–2024
No overall control	2024–present

==== Leadership ====
The role of mayor is largely ceremonial in Oldham. Political leadership is instead provided by the leader of the council. The leaders since 1974 have been:

Councillor	Party	From	To
Joseph Tennyson Hilton	Labour	1 Apr 1974	1976
Geoffrey Webb	Conservative	1976	1978
Malcolm Bamford	Conservative	1978	1979
Geoffrey Webb	Conservative	1979	1980
Joseph Tennyson Hilton	Labour	May 1980	1985
John Battye	Labour	1985	May 2000
Richard Knowles	Liberal Democrats	2000	2003
David Jones	Labour	2003	May 2008
Howard Sykes	Liberal Democrats	May 2008	May 2011
Jim McMahon	Labour	25 May 2011	15 Jan 2016
Jean Stretton	Labour	27 Jan 2016	May 2018
Sean Fielding	Labour	23 May 2018	May 2021
Arooj Shah	Labour	19 May 2021	May 2022
Amanda Chadderton	Labour	25 May 2022	May 2023
Arooj Shah	Labour	24 May 2023	May 2026

=== Composition ===
Following the 2026 election, the composition of the council was:

Party	Councillors
Labour	18
Reform	16
Oldham Group	10
Liberal Democrats	6
Conservative	4
FIP	1
Independent	5
Total	60

Two of the independent councillors sit together as the "Royton Independent" group. The next election is due in May 2027.

=== Elections ===
Since the last boundary changes in 2023, the council has comprised 60 councillors representing 20 wards, with each ward electing three councillors. Elections are held three years out of every four, with a third of the council (one councillor for each ward) elected each time for a four-year term of office. The wards are:

- Alexandra
- Chadderton Central
- Chadderton North
- Chadderton South
- Coldhurst
- Crompton
- Failsworth East
- Failsworth West
- Hollinwood
- Medlock Vale
- Royton North
- Royton South
- Saddleworth North
- Saddleworth South
- Saddleworth West and Lees
- St James'
- St Mary’s
- Shaw
- Waterhead
- Werneth

== Premises ==
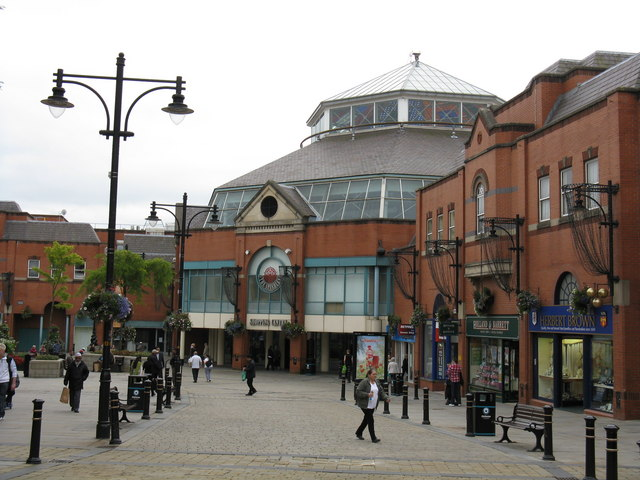
Spindles Town Square Shopping Centre: Council's main offices moved to upper floors of the complex in 2024

Council meetings are held at Oldham Civic Centre, which was purpose-built for the council in phases between 1962 and 1977. The council is in the process of vacating the building; most of the council's staff moved to offices on the upper floors of the Spindles Town Square shopping centre in early 2024.

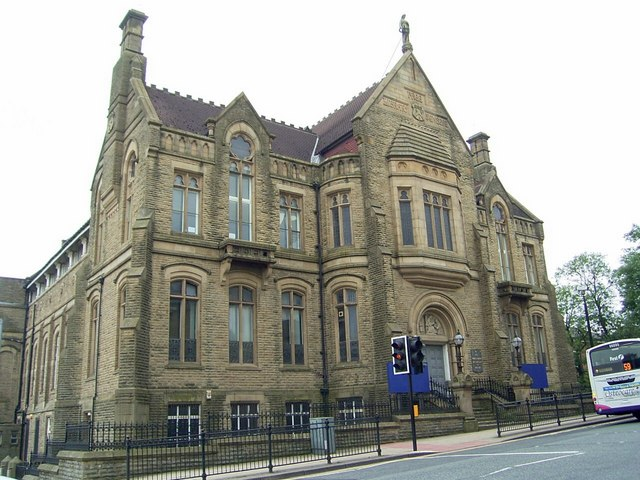
Old Library: Due to become the council's new meeting place

Council meetings are due to move to a new council chamber being created in the town's old library on Union Street, which had been built in 1883. Prior to completing its move to the Civic Centre in 1977, the council had been based at the Old Town Hall on Yorkshire Street, which had been completed in 1841.

== Coat of arms ==
The borough's coat of arms is based on the crest of the former Oldham County Borough and includes within it symbols to identify the other six districts that make up the Borough. These are the former urban districts of Chadderton, Crompton, Failsworth, Lees, Royton and Saddleworth.

The Shield is derived from the former arms of Oldham showing three white owls (a pun on "Owldham") and three red rings giving the initial letter "0".

Above it is the closed helm proper to Civic arms with its twisted crest-wreath and decorative mantling. Upon the wreath stands the Crest. The owl is shown on its rock rising from a gold circlet charged with the three red rings from the shield.

The two red griffins identify the other districts by the heraldry of their chief manorial families which are some of the most famous in history. They include the Chaddertons (connected with Chadderton, Failsworth, Crompton and Lees) and the Chethams (connected with Crompton). Both families are branches of the de Traffords whose red griffin is also seen at Eccles and elsewhere. As a necessary difference, they wear collars with fluted edges like those in the arms of the Radcliffes (Oldham, Royton and Chadderton). On the collars are the three red "bendlets" on white, of the arms of the Byrons (Failsworth, Crompton and Royton).

From each collar hangs a white heptagon symbolic of the united seven authorities. On the left one is the black "mullet" of the Asshetons (Oldham and Chadderton) and on the right Saddleworth is represented by a black saddle in reference to the name of its derivation – a settlement on a saddle-shaped ridge.

The Oldham Council motto "Sapere Aude" means "dare to be wise" with the word "Aude" containing the syllable "Owd" of the local pronunciation of "Owdham" or "Owldham."

== Youth Mayor ==
Oldham Council introduced the office of Youth Mayor in 2009 when Mohammed Adil became the first-ever holder of the post. The post was the idea of – and is chosen by – members of the Oldham Youth Council.

== Honours ==
The council can confer the title of Honorary Alderman of the Borough on persons who have, in the opinion of the council, rendered "eminent services" to it as a past member. Recipients to date are Ralph Semple, Ellen Brierley, Jack Armitage, George Edmond Lord, Sidney GW Jacobs, David Roger Jones, Christine Wheeler and Richard David Knowles.

The Freedom of the Borough is the highest honour the council can bestow. It is awarded rarely and dates back to the Middle Ages when freemen had commercial privileges and route into a position of power in a town or city. Associated with this is a ‘freedom of entry’ which the council can award to service units that have "rendered conspicuous service" and are closely associated with the borough. Freedom of entry grants the service unit the right, privilege and honour of marching through the streets of Oldham on ceremonial occasions with swords drawn, bayonets fixed, drums beating, bands playing and colours flying.

Recipients to date are: Dame Sarah Anne Lees, Dr Thomas Fawsitt, William Schofield, Charles Ward, Marjory Lees, Winston Leonard Spencer Churchill, JR Clynes, William E Freeman, James Bannon, Frank Tweedale, Thomas Driver, John Fletcher Waterhouse, the 41st (Oldham) Royal Tank Regiment TA, Sir William Turner Walton, Alice Amelia Kenyon, Charles Leslie Hale, Sir Frank lord, Dame Eva Turner, Arnold Tweedale, 75 Engineer Regiment (Volunteers), Ellen Brierley, Sir Norman Kelvin Stoller and Michael Hugh Meacher.

== Notable recent achievements ==
- Oldham’s ‘Bloom and Grow’ campaigns have seen it win the ‘Best City’ category four years running at the North West in Bloom competition up to 2013. It has also represented the region at the national Britain in Bloom in the same category and won the ‘Best City’ gong in 2012.
- Oldham was ‘Most Improved Council’ at the Local Government Chronicle awards in 2012.
- Jean Stretton was named ‘Community Champion of the Year’ and councillors Amanda Chadderton, Sean Fielding and Arooj Shah jointly won ‘Young Councillor of the Year’ awards in 2013.
- Council Leader, Jim McMahon was named ‘Leader of the Year’ at the C’llr Achievement Awards in February 2014.
- Oldham was ‘highly commended’ at the LGC Council of the Year awards for the top prize in 2014.

== Oldham child sexual exploitation scandal ==
In June 2022, an independent review into child sexual exploitation in Greater Manchester was published. It had been expanded to cover Oldham following claims that widespread child sexual exploitation had been covered up in the city. The report found there was no "widespread" abuse in the city and no evidence of a cover-up, but that some child sexual abuse victims had been failed by Greater Manchester Police and the council itself because "child protection procedures had not been properly followed".

The review also found the council had done "everything possible" to warn people of the threat of child sexual exploitation, "consistently attempted" to address the problem, and were supported in these efforts by Greater Manchester Police. Among the failings reported, the review found that police had not notified the council that Shabir Ahmed, seconded to the Oldham Pakistani Centre from his role as a welfare rights officer, had previously been arrested for sexual assault of a child. Ahmed was subsequently convicted as the ringleader of a "grooming gang". The review also found a "structural flaw" in the authority's multi-agency safeguarding processes meant that some offenders were "not being apprehended earlier".

Andy Burnham, the Mayor of Greater Manchester (Labour and Co-operative Party) who commissioned the report, said, "It is never too late to face up to past mistakes, to say sorry to those who were failed nor to prosecute those responsible for appalling crimes against children and young people". The council and Greater Manchester Police said they were "deeply sorry" for the failings.

In October 2022, the Conservative Minister for Safeguarding, Amanda Solloway, rejected calls for a national public inquiry, saying it was for local authorities to initiate local inquiries. In October 2024, Jess Phillips, Labour's safeguarding minister, also rejected a Home Office-led inquiry but supported a local inquiry. In 2025, Conservative opposition leader Kemi Badenoch and others called for a national public inquiry in Oldham. The chair of the Independent Inquiry into Child Sexual Abuse, Professor Alexis Jay, said the government should implement the previous recommendations she had published in 2022, saying victims had "had enough of inquiries, consultations and discussions" and wanted "action" instead. Home Secretary Yvette Cooper announced a government-backed Oldham inquiry, and a nationwide review of evidence, on 16 January 2025.

== See also ==
- Oldham local elections
