= 2011 Oldham Metropolitan Borough Council election =

2011 local election in England

Results of the 2011 Oldham Metropolitan Borough Council election

Elections to Oldham Council were held on 5 May 2011. One third of the council was up for election.

Labour gained overall control of the council.

After the election, the composition of the council was,

- Labour 34
- Liberal Democrat 21
- Conservative 4
- Independent 1

== Election result ==
Oldham local election result 2011
Party	Seats	Gains	Losses	Net gain/loss	Seats %	Votes %	Votes	+/−
Labour	16	7	0	+7		52.7	32,778	+14.4
Liberal Democrats	3	0	6	-6		23.4	14,538	-7.1
Conservative	1	1	2	-1		19.2	11,955	-6.3
Independent	0	0	0			3.7	2,286	-0.6
Green	0	0	0			0.9	586	+0.9

== Ward results ==
20 wards voted in the election;

=== Alexandra ward ===
Alexandra ward
Party	Candidate	Votes	%	±%
Labour	Jenny Harrison	1,586	59.5	+25.1
Conservative	Raja Iqbal	625	23.4	−0.3
Liberal Democrats	Aftab Hussain	455	17.1	−3.9
Majority		961	36.0	+25.4
Turnout		2,666		
Labour hold		Swing		

=== Chadderton Central ward ===
Chadderton Central ward
Party	Candidate	Votes	%	±%
Labour	Eddie Moores	1,679	59.4	+8.8
Conservative	Eileen Hulme	1,009	35.7	+5.5
Liberal Democrats	Pat Lord	139	4.9	−13.0
Majority		670	23.7	+3.4
Turnout		2,827		
Labour gain from Conservative		Swing		

=== Chadderton North ward ===
Chadderton North ward
Party	Candidate	Votes	%	±%
Labour	Dave Houle	1,876	58.6	+15.4
Conservative	Lewis Quigg	1,143	35.7	−2.2
Liberal Democrats	Keith Taylor	181	5.7	−10.0
Majority		733	22.9	+17.6
Turnout		3,200		
Labour gain from Conservative		Swing		

=== Chadderton South ward ===
Chadderton South ward
Party	Candidate	Votes	%	±%
Labour	Graham Shuttleworth	1,664	68.7	+16.6
Conservative	Kenneth Heeks	656	27.1	−6.2
Liberal Democrats	Fazal Rahim	101	4.2	−9.5
Majority		1,008	41.6	+21.8
Turnout		2,421		
Labour hold		Swing		

=== Coldhurst ward ===
Coldhurst ward
Party	Candidate	Votes	%	±%
Labour	Montaz Azad	2,897	60.7	+10.8
Liberal Democrats	Jilad Miah	1,661	34.6	−4.5
Conservative	Muhammed Dara	226	4.7	−6.3
Majority		1,236	25.8	+15.0
Turnout		4,784		
Labour gain from Liberal Democrats		Swing		

=== Crompton ward ===
Crompton ward
Party	Candidate	Votes	%	±%
Liberal Democrats	John Dillon	1,261	40.2	−4.5
Labour	Ken Rustidge	1,050	33.5	+13.4
Conservative	David Dunning	828	26.4	+0.7
Majority		211	6.7	−12.3
Turnout		3,139		
Liberal Democrats hold		Swing		

=== Failsworth East ward ===
Failsworth East ward
Party	Candidate	Votes	%	±%
Labour	Jim McMahon	1,925	70.7	+17.8
Conservative	Robert Barnes	674	24.8	−5.7
Liberal Democrats	Stephen Barrow	124	4.6	−7.0
Majority		1,251	45.9	+23.6
Turnout		2,723		
Labour hold		Swing		

=== Failsworth West ward ===
Failsworth West ward
Party	Candidate	Votes	%	±%
Labour	Glenys Butterworth	1,532	58.2	+12.9
Independent	Warren Bates	669	25.4	+11.3
Liberal Democrats	Ron Wise	245	9.3	−3.1
Conservative	Miranda Meadowcroft	185	7.0	−22.2
Majority		863	32.8	+15.7
Turnout		2,631		
Labour hold		Swing		

=== Hollinwood ward ===
Hollinwood ward
Party	Candidate	Votes	%	±%
Labour	Steve Williams	1,394	60.7	+16.9
Liberal Democrats	Keith Pendlebury	563	24.5	−9.5
Independent	John Berry	339	14.8	+7.7
Majority		831	36.2	+26.3
Turnout		2,296		
Labour gain from Liberal Democrats		Swing		

=== Medlock Vale ward ===
Medlock Vale ward
Party	Candidate	Votes	%	±%
Labour	Kaiser Rehman	1,846	60.3	+18.2
Liberal Democrats	Rafiq Pazeer	654	21.4	−14.6
Conservative	Zulfiqar Mohammed	562	18.4	−0.5
Majority		1,210	39.5	+33.4
Turnout		3,062		
Labour hold		Swing		

=== Royton North ward ===
Royton North ward
Party	Candidate	Votes	%	±%
Labour	Tony Larkin	1,878	60.9	+12.4
Conservative	Joseph Farquhar	962	31.2	−0.9
Liberal Democrats	Kevin Dawson	242	7.9	−11.5
Majority		916	29.7	+13.4
Turnout		3,082		
Labour hold		Swing		

=== Royton South ward ===
Royton South ward
Party	Candidate	Votes	%	±%
Labour	Steven Bashforth	1,932	65.2	+24.3
Conservative	Allan Fish	776	26.2	−2.1
Liberal Democrats	Keith Begley	257	8.7	−20.9
Majority		1,156	39.0	+27.8
Turnout		2,965		
Labour hold		Swing		

=== Saddleworth North ward ===
Saddleworth North ward
Party	Candidate	Votes	%	±%
Liberal Democrats	Derek Heffernan	1,100	31.0	−2.9
Independent	Ken Hulme	1,083	30.6	+1.2
Conservative	Phil Sewell	711	20.1	−2.0
Labour	Sean Fielding	650	18.3	+3.6
Majority		17	0.5	−4.0
Turnout		3,544		
Liberal Democrats hold		Swing		

=== Saddleworth South ward ===
Saddleworth South ward
Party	Candidate	Votes	%	±%
Conservative	Graham Sheldon	1,590	42.1	+0.9
Liberal Democrats	Phil Renold	1,094	28.9	−18.1
Labour	Dilys Fletcher	695	18.4	+12.6
Green	Dominic Wall	401	10.6	+10.6
Majority		496	13.2	
Turnout		3,780		
Conservative gain from Liberal Democrats		Swing		

=== Saddleworth West and Lees ward ===
Saddleworth West and Lees ward
Party	Candidate	Votes	%	±%
Labour	Adrian Alexander	1,316	42.3	+15.8
Liberal Democrats	Brian Lord	1,176	37.8	−10.9
Conservative	Pam Byrne	622	20.0	−2.0
Majority		140	4.5	
Turnout		3,114		
Labour gain from Liberal Democrats		Swing		

=== St James ward ===
St James ward
Party	Candidate	Votes	%	±%
Labour	Nigel Newton	1,155	53.0	+20.1
Liberal Democrats	Stephen Fairbrother	777	35.7	−3.7
Conservative	David Caddick	246	11.3	−5.9
Majority		378	17.3	
Turnout		2,178		
Labour gain from Liberal Democrats		Swing		

=== St Marys ward ===
St Marys ward
Party	Candidate	Votes	%	±%
Labour	Shadab Qumer	2,847	65.5	+16.4
Liberal Democrats	Ajawat Hussain	1,255	28.9	−12.4
Conservative	David Atherton	244	5.6	−4.0
Majority		1,592	36.3	+28.8
Turnout		4,346		
Labour hold		Swing		

=== Shaw ward ===
Shaw ward
Party	Candidate	Votes	%	±%
Liberal Democrats	Mark Alcock	1,084	40.4	−7.1
Labour	Amanda Chadderton	986	36.8	+15.2
Conservative	Phelyp Bennet	612	22.8	−8.1
Majority		98	3.6	−13.0
Turnout		2,682		
Liberal Democrats hold		Swing		

=== Waterhead ward ===
Waterhead ward
Party	Candidate	Votes	%	±%
Labour	Peter Dean	1,340	47.8	+12.7
Liberal Democrats	Kay Knox	1,064	38.0	−1.4
Conservative	Neil Allsopp	203	7.2	−7.3
Independent	Stuart Allsopp	195	7.0	−4.0
Majority		276	9.8	
Turnout		2,802		
Labour gain from Liberal Democrats		Swing		

=== Werneth ward ===
Werneth ward
Party	Candidate	Votes	%	±%
Labour	Javid Iqbal	2,530	64.7	+6.2
Liberal Democrats	Asghar Ali	1,115	28.5	+17.9
Conservative	Muhammad Imran	266	6.8	−22.7
Majority		1,415	36.2	+7.2
Turnout		3,911		
Labour hold		Swing		
