= Oasis Academy Wintringham =

Location
- Weelsby Avenue; Grimsby, North East Lincolnshire, DN32 0AZ; England; 53°32′56″N 0°04′51″W

Information
- Established: 1933 (Secondary school); 1953 (Grammar school); 2007 (Academy)
- Trust: Oasis Trust
- Department for Education URN: 135209 Tables
- Ofsted: Reports
- Gender: Mixed
- Age: 11 to 18
- Enrolment: 856
- Former name: Wintringham Grammar School
- Website: www.oasisacademywintringham.org

Oasis Academy Wintringham is a secondary school (academy) on Weelsby Avenue in Grimsby, North East Lincolnshire, England. It is just off the A16 Peaks Parkway just south-west of the A46 crossroads next to the Lisle Marsden CE Primary School in Wellow and on the Grimsby-Cleethorpes boundary (the A16). The school was originally a religious foundation, and lies in the ecclesiastical parish of St Augustine of Hippo.

== History ==
The school began in 1933 as Wintringham Secondary School on Eleanor Street.

164 people, who attended the school, were killed in the two world wars.

=== Grammar school ===
The old grammar school buildings in Weelsby Avenue, Grimsby, were opened in 1953 as Wintringham Grammar School to replace a former school on Eleanor Street, Grimsby.

In 1948 there were plans to separate the school into male and female grammar schools. The school was first divided into a boys' and girls' grammar school (they are both now demolished) on a combined site, with around 750 boys and a similar number of girls. The boys' school was on the Weelsby Avenue side of the site, and the girls' school was on the west side of the site, accessed via Park Avenue next to the tennis courts. The Highfields School which was to the north, is now the Lisle Marsden CE primary school. The school was administered by the County Borough of Grimsby Education Committee, from its offices on Eleanor Street.

On 16 November 1949 Sir Robert Watson-Watt, the inventor of radar, spoke at the annual speech night. Watson Watt thought that males, from ages 10 to 17 were the liveliest audience that he often spoke to, and were the most constantly alert and intelligent, and often asked intelligent questions. But when males reached university, Watson-Watt had much different opinions about males. Watson Watt said that when at university, too many males thought that the responsibility of the community to themselves was greater than the males' own responsibility to the community. Females at university, according to Watson-Watt, were more self-reliant and enterprising than males. Watson Watt also believed that scientific subjects had not fitted well to the British education system. He thought that there were great differences in knowledge between those who had followed the path of Humanities at school, and those that had followed the path of science.

In early July 1952 14 year old Brian Betts died in Cleethorpes Bathing Pool, from heart failure, after being rescued from the bottom of the pool.

The schools remained separate up to 1969 when a mixed sixth form became the start of a gradual merger. The sixth form shared the playing field and some out-of-school activities. The sixth form block was built between the two sites: the co-educational sixth form numbered 200. From the late 1960s until 1974, it was administered (but not taught) as the single-entity Grimsby Wintringham Grammar School for ages 11 to 18. The former Boys' School became the Upper School, and the former Girls' School became the Lower School. Music lessons were held in Highfield House, an old Victorian detached house on the school property.

In 1970 the Conservative group on Grimsby council wanted to retain the school as a traditional grammar school. John Davoll, founder of The Conservation Society, spoke on 4 November 1971.

=== Comprehensive ===
It became the comprehensive Wintringham School in September 1974. The school name comes from the Wintringham family, specifically John Wintringham. Also in 1974, administration was transferred over the Humber to Beverley, and Humberside County Council, in the Grimsby Division. The school became a comprehensive (incrementally) year by year, with the first all-ability year composed of ten forms. It also became an upper school with ages 12–18, as Grimsby became part of the three tier system.

In the late 1980s, headmaster Keith Bardgett switched the school from streaming to mixed-ability classes, the change starting with the new intake of pupils in September 1988. A restricted form of streaming remained, limited to specific subjects, notably mathematics and foreign languages. From September 1990, the naming convention for classes switched to the modern nomenclature still in use today. At the same time, a re-organisation of local education saw Wintringham give up its sixth form and take in new pupils a year earlier than was previously the case. This meant that the 2nd – 6th forms were replaced with Years 7 – 11.

In 1996, administration passed back to Grimsby under North East Lincolnshire.

=== Oasis Academy Wintringham ===
In September 2007, the school adopted Academy status under the Oasis Community Learning multi-academy trust. The former schools' buildings were to be demolished and replaced with a single newbuild costing of £25 million. The construction started on 30 August 2007, being undertaken by Clugston Construction of Scunthorpe who finished in January 2009. The start of the construction work was marked by a ceremony where Steve Chalke of Oasis and pupils from the new Academy drove the first spades into the ground. The Academy transferred across to the new buildings in February 2009.

There are also community facilities. The sports hall is sponsored by Stagecoach. The Dean Suite is named in memory of Dorothy Dean, the headteacher of the school from 1953 to 1975.

The Ofsted Visit in 2016 identified significant difficulties. An interim "executive principal" was brought in from the neighbouring Oasis Academy Immingham. In October 2015 the Oasis Trust appointed an interim executive board to replace the governing body.

Pupil outcomes reached a nadir in 2016. In 2018, Ofsted declared this a 'good' school.

== Headteachers ==
- January 1947, Ben M Forrest, a former Classics teacher at William Hulme's Grammar School in south Manchester, he became head of a grammar school, in north London, in 1951 where he stayed until December 1967, when it became a comprehensive
- September 1951 Ronald Gill, a former headmaster of Holloway Grammar School in north London; he did not believe in coeducational schools, and supported the continuation of grammar schools as the grammar system had 'proven its worth'

=== Headmistresses ===
- 1953 Miss Dorothy Dean, her brother Stanley, of Rustington, was killed on 27 November 1967 near Horsham, in his Austin-Healey Sprite, and was taken to Redhill General Hospital, she became headmistress of both schools in 1966, with Mary Buckley as deputy head, and of the comprehensive in 1974, leaving in July 1975; she died in October 2011 aged 96

== Description ==
In its current incarnation the Wintringham academy is a smaller than average sized 11–16 mixed non-selective secondary school with more boys than girls, within a school system that retains selection. Half the students are disadvantaged and are supported through the pupil premium. Pupil premium is additional funding given for pupils who are known to be eligible for free school meal or looked after children. There are few pupils who speak English as an additional language: the vast majority are of White British heritage while the proportion of pupils who have special educational needs support is above average, but those with a statement remains average.

== Curriculum ==
Virtually all maintained schools and academies follow the National Curriculum, and their success is judged on how well they succeed in delivering a 'broad and balanced curriculum'. Schools endeavour to get all students to achieve the English Baccalaureate qualification – this must include core subjects, a modern or ancient foreign language, and either history or geography.

The academy operates a three-year, Key Stage 3 where all the core National Curriculum subjects are taught. This builds on the skills, knowledge and understanding gained at primary school, and introduces youngsters who are starting from a lower than average base to wider, robust and challenging programmes of study needed to gain qualifications at Key Stage 4 French is the Modern Language offered. Year 9 is a transition year where one of the students Key Stage 4 options is started. The school places the students into one of three pathways, which leads to guided options. At the end of Year 9 students make their final exam choices.

At Key Stage 4 the focus is on the English Baccalaureate, and there are daily maths, English and science lessons- plus three guided options.

== Alumni ==
=== Wintringham School ===
- Thomas Turgoose, actor

=== Grimsby Wintringham Boys' Grammar School ===
- Alan Bass (March 22 1929 - February 12 2020) medical doctor to the England football team in the 1966 World Cup and also in 1970 and 1986
- John Edward Brown, bishop of Cyprus and the Gulf 1987–96
- Dennis Brown, professor of medicine
- Quentin Cooper, BBC Radio 4 science presenter
- Tony Ford, footballer
- Derek Gladwin, Baron Gladwin of Clee, trade unionist and life peer
- Sir William Harpham, Ambassador to Bulgaria from 1964–66
- Bryan Klug, football coach
- Richard Markham, concert pianist
- Duncan McKenzie, footballer
- Kevin Moore, footballer
- Adrian Royle, runner
- Tom Smith (engineer), aeronautical engineer, and leader of the 1960s BAC Mustard design, possibly directly influencing the later Space Shuttle
- David Tarttelin, artist
- Michael Tilmouth, musicologist, Tovey Professor of Music from October 1971
- Charles Rowland Twidale, geomorphologist and academic
- Andrew Whiten, zoologist, psychologist and academic
- Patrick Wymark, actor

=== Grimsby Wintringham Girls' Grammar School ===
- Dame Janet Baker CH, mezzo-soprano opera singer
- Doreen Forsyth, née Watkinson, Woman's Hour producer from the mid-1960s, she lived at 22 Connaught Avenue, and married Stuart Forsyth in 1956
- Sheila Foulkes, Member of the Legislative Council, Parliament of Western Australia 2005–2009
- Patricia Hodge, actress
- Julie Peasgood, actress, television presenter, author
- Vickie Ringguth, violinist with the BBC National Orchestra of Wales
- Prof Jill Rubery, Professor of Contemporary Politics at the University of Manchester
- Bridget Turner, 1960s actress from Cleethorpes

=== Wintringham Secondary School ===
- Sir Arthur Lennon Binns, chief education officer for Lancashire from 1945, being knighted in the 1954 New Year Honours; his 26 year old daughter Margaret married Sir Michael Bruce, 11th Baronet in 1945
- George Edward Briggs FRS, Regius Professor of Botany (Cambridge) from 1948 until 1960, where he conducted important work on photosynthesis with Frederick Blackman
- Norma Procter, contralto opera singer

== Former teachers ==
- Miss Clare Austin-Smith, an inspirational English and drama teacher from 1959, and the head of Lower School; she became the headmistress from January 1973 of Gainsborough High School for Girls (which became the coeducational Queen Elizabeth's High School in 1983) until 1976; she died in Bournemouth on 17 March 2021 aged 91
- Leonard Thomas Draycott, the former head of the lower school from 1953-54, physics teacher, headmaster of Carlton-le-Willows Grammar School from 1958, and previously headmaster of Wirksworth Grammar School, he collapsed and died, aged 54, when headmaster in late January 1967
- Ernest Worrall from 1932 to 1959, art teacher

== See also ==
- Oasis Academy Immingham (formerly The Immingham School)
