= Oasis Academy Leesbrook =

Location
- Roxbury Avenue; Oldham, Greater Manchester, OL4 5JE; England
- Coordinates: 53.535°N 2.08221°W

Information
- Type: Free school
- Established: September 2018
- Local authority: Oldham Borough Council
- Trust: Oasis Community Learning
- Department for Education URN: 145723 Tables
- Ofsted: Reports
- Principal: Sarah Livesey
- Gender: Mixed
- Age range: 11–16
- Enrolment: 1,254
- Capacity: 750 ( 450 in 2021 with 3 years intake)
- Website: www.oasisacademyleesbrook.org

Oasis Academy Leesbrook is coeducational secondary school located in the Oldham in Greater Manchester, England. It is part of the Oasis Community Learning. It opened to pupils in September 2018. It moved to its new site on 9 November 2020. It has not had its first Ofsted inspection.

== History ==
Oldham City Council and the Department for Education identified a need for 1000 extra secondary school places in East Oldham. Oasis Community Learning put forward a proposal to open a 1500 place Free School. This was approved in April 2017, and the site in Lees was agreed by Oldham Council in July 2017.The site was controversial as it formerly was the site of the failed Breeze Hill School that was demolished in 2013. The proposal was for a free-school, and Manchester was still reeling from the failure and closure of both the Greater Manchester UTC and the Collective Spirit Free School.

The school opened in a vacant GM-UTC building, in Oldham town centre in September 2018 and into their new purpose-built building in November, 2020.

== Description ==
Oasis Academy Leesbrook is part of the Oasis Community Learning group, and evangelical Christian charity. The trust has guided forty schools out of special measures. 19 per cent of the 52 Oasis academies are classified as failing. Oasis has opened two other free schools Oasis Academy South Bank and Oasis Academy Silvertown and senior management and teachers have experience in other Oasis schools. The Oasis philosophy involves engaging the community from the start so they have ownership, and offering facilities for the community to use. Almost 50% of the students are deprived receiving pupil premium and free school meals. Parents sign a Home-school agreement where they accept a fairly strict discipline regime.

Oasis has a long-term strategy for enhancing the performance of its schools. Firstly it has devised a standard curriculum, that each school can safely adopt knowing it will deliver the National Curriculum. Secondly it has invested in staff training so they are focused on improving the outcomes for the students, and thirdly, through its Horizons scheme it is providing each member of staff and student with a tablet.

== Building ==
The two and four storey blocks and hard landscaping were built by Galliford Try.

== Academics ==
The academy currently serves students from Year 7–11.

=== Curriculum ===
Virtually all maintained schools and academies follow the National Curriculum, where success is judged on how well they succeed in delivering a 'broad and balanced curriculum'. Schools endeavour to get all students to achieve the English Baccalaureate qualification- this must include core subjects a modern or ancient foreign language, and either History or Geography.

The academy operates a three-year, Key Stage 3 where all the core National Curriculum subjects are taught. This is a transition period from primary to secondary education, that builds on the skills, knowledge and understanding gained at primary school, and introduces youngsters who are starting from a lower than average base to wider, robust and challenging programmes of study needed to gain qualifications at Key Stage 4. Students study Spanish, French or German.
