= Oasis Academy Enfield =

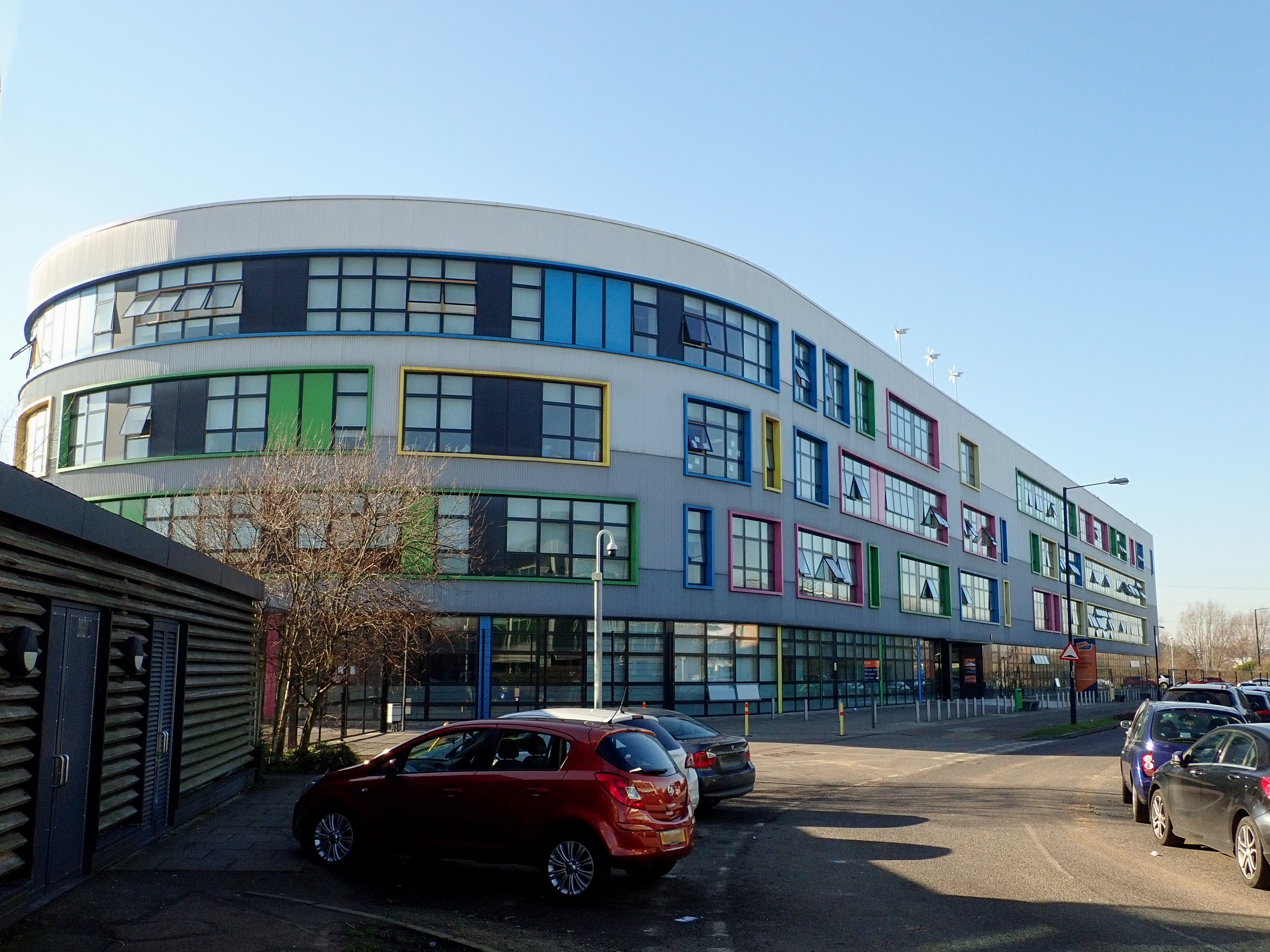

Location
- Kinetic Crescent; Innova Park; Enfield Lock, Greater London, EN3 7XH; England; 51.67361°N 0.02259°W

Information
- Type: Academy
- Motto: Learning Together, Succeeding Together
- Established: 2007
- Department for Education URN: 134311 Tables
- Ofsted: Reports
- Principal: Emma Robinson
- Gender: Coeducational
- Age: 11 to 18
- Website: www.oasisacademyenfield.org

Oasis Academy Enfield is a coeducational secondary school and sixth form with academy status, located in the Enfield Lock area of Enfield, England.

The school was established in September 2007, as one of the first academies sponsored by Oasis Community Learning. The school was initially housed in temporary accommodation before transferring to a new £21 million building in September 2008. The school maintains close links with Oasis Academy Hadley, located in nearby Ponders End.

== Description ==
Oasis Academy Enfield was an early member and a part of the Oasis Community Learning group, and evangelical Christian charity The trust have guided forty schools out of special measures. 19 percent of the 52 Oasis academies classified as failing. The trust's founder Reverend Steve Chalke once said about Oasis, "Turning round a school is sometimes a quick fix, it really, truly is. And sometimes it’s a really long, hard, hard job".

=== Governance ===
On becoming an Oasis academy, a local board of management is elected, while the strategic management is performed centrally by the Oasis Community Learning, in Lambeth. Enfield was the second secondary academy to open. Oasis has a long-term strategy for enhancing the performance of its schools. It has devised a standard curriculum, that each local board can safely adopt knowing it will deliver the National Curriculum. It has invested in staff training so they are focused on improving the outcomes for the students. In 2021, through its Horizons scheme it is providing each member of staff and student with a tablet.

=== Curriculum ===
Virtually all maintained schools and academies follow the National Curriculum; their success is judged on how well they succeed in delivering a 'broad and balanced curriculum'. Schools endeavour to have all students achieve the English Baccalaureate (EBACC) qualification. In order to achieve this pupils must gain a GCSE qualification in Maths, English, Science, a modern or ancient foreign language, and either History or Geography.

The academy operates a three-year Key Stage 3, where all the core National Curriculum subjects are taught. This is a transition period from primary to secondary education, and builds on the skills, knowledge and understanding gained at primary school. It introduces youngsters who are starting from a lower than average base to wider, robust, and challenging programmes of study needed to gain qualifications at Key Stage 4.

At Key Stage 4 the focus is on the EBACC, and there are daily Maths, English and Science lessons plus options. Spanish is the taught Modern Language.

Oasis Academy Enfield offers GCSEs and BTECs as programmes of study for pupils, while Sixth Form students can choose to study from a range of A Levels and additional BTECs.

== Principals ==
The School's first Headmaster, John Walton retired from his post in 2010 and was succeeded by former deputy Paul Hammond. Hammond remained in post until Summer 2014. Graeme Plunkett was Interim Principal for the autumn term 2014. Neil Hassell was the Academy's Principal from January 2015 to August 2018.
