= List of schools in Southampton =

This is a list of schools in Southampton in the English county of Hampshire.

== State-funded schools ==
=== Primary schools ===
- Banister Primary School
- Bassett Green Primary School
- Beechwood Junior School
- Bevois Town Primary School
- Bitterne CE Primary School
- Bitterne Manor Primary School
- Bitterne Park Primary School
- Fairisle Infant and Nursery School
- Fairisle Junior School
- Foundry Lane Primary School
- Freemantle CE Community Academy
- Glenfield Infant School
- Harefield Primary School
- Highfield CE Primary School
- Hightown Primary School
- Hollybrook Infant School
- Hollybrook Junior School
- Holy Family RC Primary School
- Hope Community School
- Kanes Hill Primary School
- Ludlow Infant Academy
- Ludlow Junior School
- Mansbridge Primary School
- Mansel Park Primary School
- Mason Moor Primary School
- Moorlands Primary School
- Mount Pleasant Infant School
- Mount Pleasant Junior School
- Newlands Primary School
- Oakwood Primary School
- Portswood Primary School
- Redbridge Primary School
- St Denys Primary School
- St John's Primary and Nursery School
- St Mark's CE School
- St Mary's CE Primary School
- St Monica Primary School
- St Patrick’s RC Primary School
- Shirley Infant School
- Shirley Junior School
- Shirley Warren Primary and Nursery School
- Sholing Infant School
- Sholing Junior School
- Sinclair Primary and Nursery School
- Springhill RC Primary School
- Swaythling Primary School
- Tanners Brook Primary School
- Thornhill Primary School
- Townhill Infant School
- Townhill Junior School
- Valentine Primary School
- Western Park Primary School
- Weston Shore Infant School
- Woolston Infant School
- Wordsworth Primary School

=== Secondary schools ===
- Bitterne Park School
- Cantell School
- Oasis Academy Lord's Hill
- Oasis Academy Mayfield
- Oasis Academy Sholing
- Redbridge Community School
- Regents Park Community College
- St Anne's Catholic School
- St George Catholic College
- St Mark's CE School
- Upper Shirley High School
- Weston Secondary School
- Woodlands Community College

=== Special and alternative schools ===
- The Cedar School
- Compass School
- Great Oaks School
- The Polygon School
- Rosewood Free School
- Southampton Hospital School
- Springwell School
- Vermont School

=== Further education ===
- Itchen College
- Richard Taunton Sixth Form College
- Southampton City College

== Independent schools ==
=== Primary and preparatory schools ===
- Charlton House Independent School
- The Gregg Preparatory School

=== Senior and all-through schools ===
- Fitrah SIPS
- The Gregg School
- King Edward VI School

=== Special and alternative schools ===
- The Serendipity School
- Yarrow Heights School
