= Oasis Academy Coulsdon =

School in the London Borough of Croydon

Location
- Homefield Road; Coulsdon, Greater London, CR5 1ES; England; 51°17′57″N 0°06′39″W

Information
- Type: Academy
- Motto: Excellence through rigour, resilience and passion
- Established: 1 September 2008
- Founder: Steve Chalke, Oasis Trust
- Local authority: Croydon
- Trust: Oasis Trust
- Department for Education URN: 135654 Tables
- Ofsted: Reports
- Principal: Catrin Green, Mark Pelling
- Gender: Coeducational
- Age: 11 to 16
- Houses: Ash, Birch, Elm, Hawthorn, Maple, Oak, Sycamore
- Colour: Green Blue
- Website: http://www.oasisacademycoulsdon.org/

Oasis Academy Coulsdon, formerly known as Coulsdon High School, is a school in the London Borough of Croydon, England. It is between the area of Coulsdon and Caterham. It is an academy run by the Christian charity Oasis Trust. The conversion to an academy in 2008 attracted a £20 million investment over five years by the government, via the Oasis Trust.

== History ==
=== Taunton Manor ===
Taunton Manor opened in 1959. The main buildings have stayed pretty much the same since then, with various extensions being built.

=== Coulsdon High ===
Taunton Manor reopened as Coulsdon High in the Summer of 1994. Several new extensions were built for the changeover. In 1999 the school, which was located in an area where some other schools were selective, attempted to change its admissions policy to achieve "a more balanced ability range", but was prevented from doing so. A further judgement the following year allowed it to retain its feeder primary schools.

Coulsdon High received a 'Good' Ofsted judgement in 2001, and was awarded specialist status for maths, science, IT and design technology in 2002.

In 2003 the school was reported to be suffering significant financial challenge, with an impending budget deficit that was set to impact the school timetable and staffing levels. The problems were linked to a national school funding crisis.

Ofsted's system of inspection changed significantly in 2005, and in 2006 Coulsdon High was put into Special Measures. However a few months later it received its best ever SATS results, and the following year the special measures were revoked by Ofsted when the school was judged to be rapidly improving. The report praised the vision and commitment of the headteacher and senior management team as crucial in setting the agenda for improvement, and also found the school to be in the top 25 per cent of schools for the value it added to students' achievements.

However plans to replace Coulsdon High with a sponsored academy were already under way on the grounds that the period in special measures had affected pupil recruitment and created doubt that the school could recover the confidence of local parents quickly enough for financial viability to be restored. Many objected to the plans, claiming that the consultation was flawed and highlighting the school's recent rapid progress. In its final year Coulsdon High achieved the best GCSE results in the school's history, a 41% A* – C pass rate.

Coulsdon Academy closed in July 2007, and the occasion was marked with a party, attended by former staff and students.

=== Oasis Academy Coulsdon ===
The school reopened again as Oasis Academy Coulsdon on 1 September 2008. The opening ceremony was attended by the then Parliamentary Under Secretary of Schools Lord Adonis and the founder of the Oasis Trust Steve Chalke. The new headteacher was John Murphy. Oasis invested over £20 million of government funding into the school, resulting in the opening of a community health-care centre in 2009 and a sixth form in 2011. In July 2014 the Sixth Form shut down due to poor intake.

The academy was rated as "good" by Ofsted in its first full inspection in 2011, and it maintained that rating under the revised Ofsted framework in 2015.

== Academics ==
=== Description ===
Oasis Academy Coulsdon is part of the Oasis Community Learning group, an evangelical Christian charity. The trust have guided forty schools out of special measures. 19 per cent of the 52 Oasis academies classified as failing. The trust's founder Reverend Steve Chalke says "Turning round a school is sometimes a quick fix, it really, truly is. And sometimes it’s a really long, hard, hard job".

==== Curriculum ====
Virtually all maintained schools and academies follow the National Curriculum, and there success is judged on how well they succeed in delivering a 'broad and balanced curriculum'. Schools endeavour to get all students to achieve the English Baccalaureate(EBACC) qualification- this must include core subjects a modern or ancient foreign language, and either History or Geography.

The academy operates a two-year, Key Stage 3 where all the core National Curriculum subjects are taught. This is a transition period from primary to secondary education, that builds on the skills, knowledge and understanding gained at primary school, and introduces youngsters who are starting from a lower than average base to wider, robust and challenging programmes of study needed to gain qualifications at Key Stage 4. Spanish, German and French are taught to all pupils for a term each in Year 7, then pupils choose one language to study in Year 8, and for the rest of Key Stage 4.

At Key Stage 4 the focus is on the EBACC, and there are daily Maths, English and Science lessons- plus options. By doing a three-year Key Stage 4, students get to study an additional option subject. In each year and each subject, students are issued with a knowledge organiser and they program of studies is published in advance on-line under the title 'Curriculum Maps'. All academies must publish their statement of curriculum intent: here it comes in two parts- the intent of the trust to secure the students futures by providing a knowledge based curriculum, and the intent of the local hub/school that talks about the need to provide disadvantaged children with additional cultural capital in the process in order to prevent a wider disparity opening up when learning becomes more independently driven in Key Stage 5 and beyond.

== Famous graduates ==
Famous graduates of Oasis Academy Coulsdon in all its previous forms, the three times world champion boxer Duke McKenzie. Mazhar Majeed, the cricket bookmaker who was arrested on charges of match fixing, is also a graduate.

== Safety & Security ==
Oasis Academy Coulsdon contains an advanced security system using Salto Inspired Access to secure and control doors around the premises. All classroom are always locked from the outside and has a fully integrated lockdown system allowing the school to remain secure during a threat. All areas of the building have fire sprinklers built into the ceiling and fire extinguishers placed strategically around the building. The building is protected from fire with an addressable digital Protec fire alarm system installed. There are over 100 CCTV cameras installed and DMR Digital radios are used to ensure secure communication.
