= Oasis Academy Brislington =

Location
- Hungerford Road; Bristol, BS4 5EY; England; 51.4251°N 2.5386°W

Information
- Type: Secondary Academy
- Motto: First among equals
- Established: 2015 (refounded)
- Trust: Oasis Community Learning
- Department for Education URN: 141652 Tables
- Ofsted: Reports
- Principal: Barnaby Ash
- Gender: Co-educational
- Age: 11 to 16
- Enrollment: ~1300 as of June 2024
- Capacity: ~1300
- Colour: Green Black
- Website: www.oasisacademybrislington.org

Oasis Academy Brislington is a co-educational secondary school with academy status, located in the Brislington West area of Bristol, England. The school has a long history in the local community, but was rebuilt in 2008 and taken over by the Oasis Charitable Trust in 2015.

== History ==
=== Brislington Comprehensive School ===
The school was founded on local farmland as a secondary modern school; it was opened on 16 April 1956, and then opened officially in October 1956 by Sir David Eccles, then Minister of Education. A Technical Block was added in 1959, with another block, sports hall and swimming pool in 1966-1968. Pupil numbers in 1956 were just over 140, but would climb to 1,850 at its peak.

=== Brislington Enterprise College ===
Under the 2002 Specialist Schools Programme, the school became Brislington Enterprise College, a foundation school administered by Bristol City Council. It acted as a Business and Enterprise College and Teaching Development Agency designated training school. It rebranded in 2004, owing to academic underperformance. The college frequently featured on Teachers TV, in some university studies, as well as on the Channel 4 episode, Dispatches: The Children Left Behind, on 11 February 2008. The old school buildings were demolished and new buildings designed and built by Skanska, were officially opened in October 2008 by Kevin McCloud, under the Building Schools for the Future scheme, and a new house system was introduced for each learning community. However, the school still struggled; from 2003 to 2009, its GCSE performance was well below both local authority and national levels, while its ‘Value Added’ in 2013 was the lowest in Bristol. Despite being taken over by the South East Bristol Educational Trust in 2012, it was ‘inadequate’ in 2013, then ‘requires improvement' in 2014. It was converted to academy status, sponsored by Oasis Trust, in February 2015 and was renamed Oasis Academy Brislington.

=== Oasis Academy Brislington ===
Under the Oasis Trust, the school received an improved Ofsted inspection in 2018, before being rated as ‘good’ in 2021. The school is continuing to make improvements, in line with Oasis’ long term strategy for enhancing the performance of its schools. Firstly it has devised a standard curriculum, that each school can safely adopt knowing it will deliver the National Curriculum. Secondly it has invested in staff training so they are focused on improving the outcomes for the students, and thirdly, through its Horizons scheme it is providing each member of staff and student with a tablet.

== Facilities ==
The school occupies a £34.8 million building, designed by Wilkinson Eyre Architects and HAL Architects developed along the lines of ‘schools within a school’, as there are seven ‘learning communities’ coming off a central corridor. The school building has biomass heating and uses a rainwater system to flush its toilets and natural ventilation and light whenever possible, which contribute to a BREEAM rating of “very good”. The building was ‘highly commended’ in the Excellence and won ‘Best School Team’ in the BSF Awards 2008, a case study for the Partnership for Schools and featured in the national news.

The school has extensive grounds, in which professional gardeners created wildflower meadows, planted 600 trees, 12,000 shrubs, 35,000 bulbs, and grass seeded areas totalling 30,000m2, as well as a garden for SEN pupils. It also features Walter Jack’s bunchedupbenchforbec, a professional artwork commissioned by the school. In the grounds, the school has sports facilities including synthetic turf pitches, grass pitches for rounders, softball, football, rugby union, a fitness suite, and sports hall measuring 690 square metres, all of which have been developed since 2007. The school has other co-curricular facilities, such as a dance studio.

The school has produced a virtual tour of its site and facilities.

== List of Principals ==
Name	Years as Principal
John Sydney Hellier	1955–1978
David G. Pert	1978–1988
Gordon Clements	1988-2002
John Matthews	2002–2015
Peter Knight	2015–2024
Barnaby Ash	2024–

== House System ==
In its seventy year history, the school has often had a house-system. The first Head Master, J.S. Hellier, a committed Christian socialist, inaugurated the first eight houses: Lawrence, Southey, Tyndale, Müller, Carpenter, Blackwell, Brunel and Kingsley. In around 1970, owing to the growing size of the school, Fry House and Plimsoll House were added. Pupils would dine in their houses in house-rooms.

After J.S. Hellier's retirement, the houses were renamed after birds of prey, including Osprey, Falcon, Eagle and Kestrel, before the system fell into disuse. After the school's rebuilding in 2008, Brislington Enterprise College briefly restored the house-system with five houses named after big cats: Cougar, Jaguar, Lynx, Panther, Puma.

== Alumni ==
=== Brislington Comprehensive School ===
- Ian Brimble, (1948-), actor
- Julia Chambers, (1956-), actress
- Julie Burchill, (1959-), novelist and journalist
- Jack Lopresti, (1969-), Member of Parliament for Filton and Bradley Stoke (2010-2024)
- Neil Cross (1969-), novelist and scriptwriter, creator of Luther and Hard Sun

== See also ==
- Oasis Academy Brightstowe
- Oasis Academy John Williams
