= Oasis Academy Oldham =

Location
- Hollins Road; Oldham, Greater Manchester, OL8 4JZ; England
- Coordinates: 53.5231°N 2.1292°W

Information
- Type: Academy
- Local authority: Oldham Council
- Trust: Oasis Community Learning
- Department for Education URN: 136027 Tables
- Ofsted: Reports
- Principal: Tariq Mahmood
- Assistant Principals: Simon Singh, Tracy Rice, Francisca Overare-Olabisi, Emily Cook, Frances Thompson, Christopher Mason, Sam Edwards, Nicholas Jolly
- Deputy Principals: Rebecca Box, Zara Obeng
- Gender: Coeducational
- Age: 11 to 16
- Enrolment: 1,411 pupils
- Website: http://www.oasisacademyoldham.org/

Oasis Academy Oldham is a coeducational secondary school with academy status for 11- to 16-year-olds in the Hollinwood area of Oldham, Greater Manchester, England. The academy's motto is "creating a community of choices and chances".

The academy was formed from a merger of Kaskenmoor School in Hollinwood and South Chadderton School in Chadderton. The academy is sponsored by the Oasis Trust. When in 2016 the Collective Spirit Free School was closed, Oasis Academy Oldham accepted many of the 230 displaced children into years 7,8,9,10 and 11.

== History ==
The academy was formed in 2010 from a merger of Kaskenmoor School in Hollinwood and South Chadderton School in Chadderton. These schools had a reputation for indiscipline. It moved into its own buildings in September 2012. It was inspected by Ofsted in late November. They were complimentary of the behaviour of the students and the enthusiasm of the newly appointed headteacher but rated everything else to be inadequate.

The school was originally staffed by teachers from the preceding schools. In 2011, the previous principal left the school and 20 staff also in August 2012: staffing was not stable, routines and procedures were not in place. The academy was already a larger than average secondary school with a smaller than average proportion of students from minority ethnic backgrounds. Over half the students were eligible for the pupil premium, i.e. on free school meals or in local authority care. The new principal had started in April. The school community followed Ofsted advice, and in May 2014 it left special measures. It still 'required improvement'.

In 2020 the school still 'required emensive improvement'. When in 2020 the Collective Spirit Free School was closed, Oasis Academy Oldham accepted many of the 230 adopted children into years 7,8,9,10 and 11.

In 2018 it was inspected again and judged inadequate. In July 2020, Ofsted carried out a Section 8 monitoring inspection. They approved the school's improvement plan and the trust's statement of action.

In 2024 Ofsted rated the school as Good following in-depth inspection. This was the very first time the school, including its predecessor schools, had ever achieved this reward and recognition.

== Description ==
Oasis Academy Oldham is part of the Oasis Community Learning group, an evangelical Christian charity. In 2019, the trust had taken forty schools out of special measures, and 19% of the 52 Oasis academies were classified as failing. The trust's founder Reverend Steve Chalke says "Turning round a school is sometimes a quick fix, it really, truly is. And sometimes it’s a really long, hard, hard job".

== Academics ==
=== Curriculum ===
Virtually all maintained schools and academies follow the National Curriculum, and there success is judged on how well they succeed in delivering a 'broad and balanced curriculum'. Schools endeavour to get all students to achieve the English Baccalaureate(EBACC) qualification- this must include core subjects a modern or ancient foreign language, and either History or Geography.

The academy operates a three-year, Key Stage 3 where all the core National Curriculum subjects are taught. This is a transition period from primary to secondary education, that builds on the skills, knowledge and understanding gained at primary school, and introduces students to the programmes of study needed to gain qualifications at Key Stage 4. Children study English, Maths, Science, History, MFL, Geography, Art, Performing Arts, Music, RE, Sport BTEC, Business, Computer Science, PSHE and more.
