= Oasis Academy MediaCityUK =

Location
- King William Street; Salford Quays; Salford, Greater Manchester, M50 3UQ; England; 53.4754°N 2.2838°W

Information
- Type: Academy
- Trust: Oasis Community Learning
- Specialists: Arts (Media); ICT; Business and Enterprise
- Department for Education URN: 135661 Tables
- Ofsted: Reports
- Principal: Christian Harris (since September 2025)
- Gender: Coeducational
- Age: 11 to 16
- Enrolment: 877 (as of September 2021)
- Capacity: 1150
- Website: www.oasisacademymediacityuk.org

Oasis Academy MediaCityUK (formerly Hope Hall then Hope High School) is a co-educational secondary school for 11-16 year olds in Salford Quays, Salford, Greater Manchester, England. The school is an academy run by Oasis Community Learning, a multi-academy trust. The buildings date from 2012. It has had a turbulent history but is now classed by Ofsted as a "Good" school.

== History ==
=== Hope Hall and Hope High ===
The present-day academy has its origins in Hope Hall Secondary Modern School which opened in 1958 on Prestwood Road/Eccles Old Road in Pendleton. It was named after Hope Hall, a manor house on the site, demolished in 1956 by the City of Salford Education Committee to make way for the school. The architects, J. C. Prestwich & Sons, had already been appointed in 1939, but building was postponed by the Second World War. In 1954, the Education Committee decided to resume their plans due to a shortage of school capacity in West Salford. The first phase of building was completed in 1958, with extensions in 1964-1965 doubling the school's area.

The school was later renamed Hope High School. In 2001, Windsor High was closed and its pupils transferred to Hope and Buile Hill high schools, resulting in an expansion of the school.

=== Transfer to Oasis ===
Plans began in 2006 under the Building Schools for the Future programme to replace Hope High with an Oasis Trust sponsored academy with sixth form provision and to relocate the school to Salford Quays. Some reasons given by Salford City Council for closing the school in Pendleton were a decline in demand and the high density of schools in the area.

When it became an academy in September 2008 it was renamed Oasis Academy MediaCityUK. The name reflected the planned location of the school in MediaCityUK, chosen in anticipation of the BBC's relocation there. The closure of the school and transfer to Oasis was brought forward to 2008, despite objections from the National Union of Teachers and NASUWT, though the school initially remained on the same site.

The academy opened a sixth form centre with a planned capacity of 250, which had 40 students in 2009, and was no longer operational as of 2012.

Ahead of the move, the academy also made 14 teachers involuntarily redundant in 2011. Unionised teachers called for a meeting with management to address concerns about transparency for affected staff and educational standards for students who would lose teachers part way through the academic year. Staff walked out when management refused to revisit their handling of the redundancies, closing the school for a day. Students rioted in support of their teachers.

=== At MediaCityUK site ===
In September 2012, the academy moved to its £25 million (equivalent to £37 million in 2025) new-build site at Salford Quays. After a full inspection in 2014, Ofsted deemed the school "inadequate" in all areas and it was put into special measures. Fiona O’Sullivan was appointed principal in November 2014, and expelled nine students, recruited a new leadership team, and brought in six extra teachers in a turnaround bid. Weekly staff training was put in place and assistance was accepted from St Patrick's Roman Catholic High School in Eccles.

=== Former headteachers and principals ===
==== Hope Hall and Hope High School ====
- Victor Innes Tomlinson, 1958 - 1972
- Valerie Ivison, at least 1978 - 1985
- Alan Hewitt, 1991 - 2004
- Nick Joseph, until closure in 2008

==== Oasis Academy MediaCityUK ====
- Dave Terry, 2008 - April 2010
- Patrick Ottley-O'Connor, 2013 (for 3 weeks)
- Patrick Rice, October 2013 - April 2014
- Fiona O'Sullivan, May 2014 - October 2018
- Marie Dillon, October 2018 - May 2021
- Mr Paul F McEvoy, June 2021 - August 2025

== Description ==
Oasis Academy MediaCityUK is part of the Oasis Community Learning group, an evangelical Christian charity. As of 2019, the trust said it had guided forty schools out of special measures, though 10 of out the 52 Oasis academies were still classified as failing. The trust's founder Reverend Steve Chalke said "Turning round a school is sometimes a quick fix, it really, truly is. And sometimes it’s a really long, hard, hard job".

Oasis has a long-term strategy for enhancing the performance of its schools. Firstly it has devised a standard curriculum, that each school can safely adopt knowing it will deliver the National Curriculum. Secondly it has invested in staff training so they are focused on improving the outcomes for the students, and thirdly, through its Horizons scheme it is providing each member of staff and student with a tablet.

=== Curriculum ===
As an academy, Oasis Academy MediaCity is not required to follow the National Curriculum. At Key Stage 3 all the core National Curriculum subjects are however taught. This includes a transition period to secondary education, building on knowledge and skills from primary school, giving all pupils equal access to wider, more challenging programmes of study needed to gain qualifications at Key Stage 4. At Key Stage 4 the focus is on the English Baccalaureate (EBACC), and there are daily Maths, English and Science lessons, plus some "options" subjects. Spanish is the Modern Language taught.

=== Lesson structure ===
Lessons follow a three-part structure:

1. Do Now: Preparation for the lesson and self-assessment of previous work
2. I do - We do - You do:
  - I do: an overview of the main concepts of the lesson
  - We do: an explanation of how to apply these concepts, with examples
  - You do: students work independently to apply the concepts to a task
3. Plenary: Recap and tidy away lesson materials

== Exam results and school performance ==
In 2018, Oasis Academy MediaCityUK announced a 60% pass rate of pupils gaining grades 4–9 in English & Maths combined. 74% achieved grade 4–9 in English and 67% achieved grade 4–9 in Maths.

In its Ofsted inspection in June 2016, the school was rated "Good". 80% of the staff had changed and systems were in place, students felt that the school was safe and calmer. The school received a second successive "Good" inspection outcome in 2025.

The school was given an outstanding Progress score of +0.34 and more recently in 2025 it achieved a progress score of 0.

== Pupil demographics ==
The school has three times the national average of pupils eligible for free school meals, as of 2025.
