= Tarttelin =

Tarttelin is a surname. Notable people with the surname include:

- Abigail Tarttelin (born 1987), English novelist and actress
- David Tarttelin (born 1929), English painter, paternal grandfather of Abigail
