= Oasis Academy Hadley =

Location
- South Street; Enfield, Middlesex, EN3 4PX; England; 51°38′31″N 0°02′16″W

Information
- Type: Academy
- Motto: Learning and Living in Harmony
- Established: 7 September 2009
- Local authority: Enfield
- Specialist: Maths; ICT; Music
- Department for Education URN: 135958 Tables
- Ofsted: Reports
- Principal: Zoe Thompson
- Gender: Coeducational
- Age: 3 to 18
- Houses: Sugar; Gates; Somerville; Pascal; Wonder; Lennox
- Colour: Gold Blue
- Website: http://www.oasisacademyhadley.org/

Oasis Academy Hadley is an all-through academy school in the Ponders End area of the London Borough of Enfield, England, run by Oasis Community Learning. It is the second Oasis academy in London and has close links with Oasis Academy Enfield. It opened on 7 September 2009. It opened in the existing buildings of Albany School and the Primary Phase opened its reception class in September 2010. Mid January 2013, the new building in Ponders End was opened.

== Description ==
Oasis Academy Hadley is part of the Oasis Community Learning group, an evangelical Christian charity. The trust have guided forty schools out of special measures. 19 per cent of the 52 Oasis academies classified as failing.

=== Governance ===
On becoming an Oasis academy, a local board of management provided by the regional hub, while the strategic management is performed centrally by the Oasis Community Learning, in Lambeth. Hadley was the second secondary academy to open in London.

Oasis has a long-term strategy for enhancing the performance of its schools. It has devised a standard curriculum, that each local board can safely adopt knowing it will deliver the National Curriculum. It has invested in staff training so they are focused on improving the outcomes for the students. IN 2021, through its Horizons scheme it is providing each member of staff and student with a tablet.

Oasis Academy Hadley is named after mathematician John Hadley, who lived in the area.

== Albany School ==
Oasis Academy Hadley replaced Albany School which opened in 1939. The school opened as separate boys' and girls' schools on the same site. It was opened as a co-educational secondary modern school in 1999, and in 2000 was converted to a comprehensive school. In 2008 became a specialist Business and Enterprise college. In July 2009, the school celebrated its 70th anniversary and later that month closed.

== Buildings ==
The school was built on the site of the Ponders End gas-works.
