= Oasis Academy Arena =

Location
- Albert Road, South Norwood, Croydon, Greater London, SE25 4QL; England
- Coordinates: 51.3931°N 0.0626°W

Information
- Type: Academy
- Established: September 2014
- Local authority: London Borough of Croydon
- Trust: Oasis Community Learning
- Department for Education URN: 140209 Tables
- Ofsted: Reports
- Principal: Jeanette Bell
- Gender: Mixed
- Age range: 11–16
- Enrolment: 520 (2021)
- Capacity: 900
- Website: www.oasisacademyarena.org

Oasis Academy Arena is a coeducational secondary school located in the South Norwood in Greater London, England. It is part of Oasis Community Learning.

== Description ==
Oasis Academy Arena is part of the Oasis Community Learning group, and evangelical Christian charity. The trust have guided forty schools out of special measures. 19 per cent of the 52 Oasis academies classified as failing. The trust's founder Reverend Steve Chalke says "Turning round a school is sometimes a quick fix, it really, truly is. And sometimes it’s a really long, hard, hard job".

Oasis has a long term strategy for enhancing the performance of its schools. Firstly it has devised a standard curriculum, that each school can safely adopt knowing it will deliver the National Curriculum. Secondly it has invested in staff training so they are focused on improving the outcomes for the students, and thirdly, through its Horizons scheme it is providing each member of staff and student with a tablet.

== History ==
The school opened with one year group in September 2015, and moved into its newly built accommodation in September 2016, there were problems with the children who were described as lively. High powered senior staff arrived in 2017. They found a school that was lacking in routines and a stable teaching force. In March 2018, Ofsted made its first visit and put the school in special measures. The Ofsted report set a series of targets. Ofsted made a monitoring visit where it was positive about the reforms being made, and in November 2019 decided enough improvements had been made for it to come out measures.

== Buildings ==
The school was built as part of the Olympic legacy, adjacent to the Croydon Arena Athletics Track. The Project was managed by Willmot Dixon. This was a £20 m contract to build two teaching blocks, access roads and all-weather pitch. They started on site in April 2015 and completed in August 2016.
