= Oasis Academy Immingham =

Location
- Pelham Road; Immingham, Lincolnshire, DN40 1JU; England; 53.61475°N 0.21134°W

Information
- Type: Academy
- Established: 14 October 1936
- Department for Education URN: 135176 Tables
- Ofsted: Reports
- Principal: Sara Rowe
- Gender: Coeducational
- Age: 11 to 19
- Enrolment: 622 as of March 2021
- Capacity: 1150
- Website: www.oasisacademyimmingham.org

Oasis Academy Immingham (formerly The Immingham School) is a coeducational secondary school with academy status located in Immingham, North East Lincolnshire, England.

== History ==
=== Secondary modern school ===
It opened as Immingham Senior School on 14 October 1936. The headmaster was Herbert Wheatley. The school magazine was called 'Pilgrim' due to local connection at Immingham Creek in 1608, It became Immingham Secondary Modern School in 1945.

The first headmaster of the secondary modern school was 37 year old Ernest Cowten, the former head of Worlaby Church of England School from 1940. He was later the head of Riddings Comprehensive School in Scunthorpe until July 1973, and remained at 40 Stallingborough Road in Immingham, where he was the organist of St Andrew’s Church Immingham. moving to Barton, where he died in August 1993.

By 1970 it was a seven-form entry school. 37 year old Michael Roper was headmaster from January 1971.; he was the former deputy headmaster of Armthorpe Comprehensive School, and had served as a 2nd Lt in the South Lancashire Regiment. He retired in July 1984 due to health, aged 51.

41 year old Roger Whyman was headmaster from January 1985, having joined in 1978 as a history teacher.

=== Comprehensive school ===
It became comprehensive in September 1971.

Previously a community school administered by North East Lincolnshire Council, The Immingham School converted to academy status on 1 September 2007 and was renamed Oasis Academy Immingham. As an academy the school is sponsored by the Oasis Trust, however Oasis Academy Immingham continues to coordinate with North East Lincolnshire Council for admissions.

== Description ==
Oasis Academy Immingham is part of the Oasis Community Learning group, and evangelical Christian charity The trust have guided forty schools out of special measures. 19 per cent of the 52 Oasis academies classified as failing. The trust's founder Reverend Steve Chalke says "Turning round a school is sometimes a quick fix, it really, truly is. And sometimes it’s a really long, hard, hard job".

Oasis has a long term strategy for enhancing the performance of its schools. Firstly it has devised a standard curriculum, that each school can safely adopt knowing it will deliver the National Curriculum. Secondly it has invested in staff training so they are focused on improving the outcomes for the students, and thirdly, through its Horizons scheme it is providing each member of staff and student with a tablet.

=== Curriculum ===
Virtually all maintained schools and academies follow the National Curriculum, and their success is judged on how well they succeed in delivering a 'broad and balanced curriculum'. Schools endeavour to get all students to achieve the English Baccalaureate qualification- this must include core subjects a modern or ancient foreign language, and either History or Geography.

The academy operates a three-year, Key Stage 3 where all the core National Curriculum subjects are taught. This is a transition period from primary to secondary education, that builds on the skills, knowledge and understanding gained at primary school, and introduces youngsters who are starting from a lower than average base to wider, robust and challenging programmes of study needed to gain qualifications at Key Stage 4.

At Key Stage 4 the focus is on the English Baccalaureate, and there are daily maths, English and science lessons- plus some options. French is the taught modern language.

Oasis Academy Immingham offers GCSEs and BTECs as programmes of study for pupils. The school also specialises in engineering, commerce and enterprise.

== Notable former pupils ==
- Richard Barnbrook, BNP London Assembly leader from 2008–12
