= Oasis Academy Sholing =

Location
- Middle Road; Southampton, Hampshire, SO19 8PH; England
- Coordinates: 50°54′18.81″N 1°21′32.28″W

Information
- Type: Academy
- Local authority: Southampton
- Trust: Oasis Community Learning
- Department for Education URN: 146284 Tables
- Ofsted: Reports
- Principal: Martin Brown
- Gender: Coeducational
- Age: 11 to 16
- Enrolment: 1,050
- Website: www.oasisacademysholing.org

Oasis Academy Sholing, previously known as The Sholing Technology College and, before that, Sholing Girls' School, is an academy school in east Southampton, Hampshire, in the south of England. The school is for girls and boys aged 11 to 16 years. The school was founded as Sholing Middle Road Girls' School between 1910 and 1912. It became a specialist technical college in 2003, though still remained a girls school. It became an Oasis Charitable Trust academy in September 2018 with a mixed boys and girls entry.

== History ==
The Middle Road school buildings originally housed a boys' school, but this was converted to a girls' school - then called Sholing Middle Road Girls' School - in the years 1910–1912. The buildings were further altered between 1914 and 1920. In 1938 the school was referred to as "Middle Road Senior Girls' School, Sholing" when Southampton Corporation were tendering for an electrical installation to take place there. During the war the girls were temporarily based in the nearby Merry Oak Boys School, built in 1935, as well as in St Monica Road Boys School. By 1954, the school was named "Sholing (Middle Road) Secondary Girls' School" and Southampton Town Council were seeking tenders for a constructor to build a new annexe. Sholing Girls School completed its transition to a specialist college of technology, under the name The Sholing Technology College, with an official ceremony in May 2003, though still remained an all girl school. By 2006 there were 999 girls in the school, and the Ofsted report was Good.

In 2015, pupils and staff at the school were offered counselling following the conviction of a former teacher for possessing images of child sexual exploitation.

== Description ==
An Ofsted inspection in May 2016 downgraded the school from 'Good' to 'Inadequate' and recommended special measures. The report stated "Underachievement has become widespread in core areas of the curriculum. Standards of achievement and behaviour have fallen significantly since the last inspection and leaders have not delivered recommendations made at that time. Consequently, governors and leaders are not demonstrating the capacity to improve the school." The headteacher of the school, Martin Brown, challenged the report. In February 2018, after nearly two years of negotiations between The Sholing Technology and Oasis Community Learning, it was announced that the school would join Oasis, and become an academy, despite an improved Ofsted report in late 2017. The school was officially re-established as Oasis Academy Sholing in September 2018.

Oasis Academy Sholing joined the Oasis Community Learning group, and evangelical Christian charity 19 per cent of the 52 Oasis academies classified as failing. The trust's founder Reverend Steve Chalke says "Turning round a school is sometimes a quick fix, it really, truly is. And sometimes it’s a really long, hard, hard job".

The Academy was most recently inspected by Ofsted in October 2022 where it was rated as Requires Improvement

=== Curriculum ===
Virtually all maintained schools and academies follow the National Curriculum, and there success is judged on how well they succeed in delivering a 'broad and balanced curriculum'. Schools endeavour to get all students to achieve the English Baccalaureate qualification- this must include core subjects a modern or ancient foreign language, and either History or Geography.

The academy operates a three-year, Key Stage 3 where all the core National Curriculum subjects are taught in year 7 and 8. In year 9 students select the humanities subject they wish to do in years 10 and 9. This becomes one of their Key Stage 4 options. This is a transition year. At the end of that year they are guided to choose 4 options. At Key Stage 4 the focus is on the English Baccalaureate, the students continue with the core subjects and there are daily Maths, English and Science lessons. In addition there are four options: One is the chosen Humanity, the second will normally be a language. There are two other subjects from a list of Art, Drama, BTEC Music, BTEC Travel & Tourism, Religious Studies, Media Studies, BTEC Health & Social Care, BTEC Sport, Food Preparation and Nutrition, Computer Science, Creative iMedia.
