= Oasis Academy Lister Park =

Location
- North Avenue; Bradford, West Yorkshire, BD8 7ND; England
- Coordinates: 53.8139°N 1.7650°W

Information
- Type: Academy
- Local authority: Bradford
- Department for Education URN: 139995 Tables
- Ofsted: Reports
- Principal: Siân Dover
- Gender: Mixed
- Age: 11 to 18
- Enrolment: 1040 as of September 2016
- Website: http://www.oasisacademylisterpark.org/

Oasis Academy Lister Park (formerly The Challenge College) is a mixed secondary school and sixth form located in Bradford, West Yorkshire, England. The school is named after Lister Park which is located near the school campus.

Previously a community school administered by Bradford City Council, The Challenge College converted to academy status on 1 September 2013 and was renamed Oasis Academy Lister Park. The school is now sponsored by the Oasis Trust but continues to coordinate with Bradford City Council for admissions.

The schools current principal, Sian Dover, assumed her role in 2020 after her predecessor, Ian Simpson, moved to another academy within the trust.

The school enjoyed a positive Ofsted in February 2019, where it was graded as a good school and the then principal praised for transforming the school.

== History ==
Oasis Academy Lister Park is part of the Oasis Community Learning group, and evangelical Christian charity. The trust have guided forty schools out of special measures. 19 per cent of the 52 Oasis academies classified as failing. The trust's founder Reverend Steve Chalke says "Turning round a school is sometimes a quick fix, it really, truly is. And sometimes it’s a really long, hard, hard job".

Ofsted examined the school in 2015, and found an inadequate school with 964 students who mainly did not speak English at home. The proportion of disadvantaged children was well above average, the proportion with special needs and disabilities was above average. Two hundred of these were in the sixth form where little was achieved. There had been a very high turnover of staff, governance was weak and at odds with the sponsor. The staff that had been appointed hadn't had time to make an impact on the inadequate teaching. While Oasis were the sponsors they were advisors not decision makers. Before the report was published Oasis had installed an executive principal and started on an action plan. The school was in special measures and judged against set of specific targets. Ofsted required that:

- the eradication of inadequate teaching
- planning training for all teachers
- ensuring teachers use existing data when planning lessons for both mid and high ability
- ensuring that lesson activities are interesting
- changing the mathematics curriculum to include complex mathematical problem solving
- changing marking routines so spelling, punctuation and grammar mistakes are followed up

It required that:

- students behaviour, attendance and punctuality was formally monitored and improved.

But also that managers and leaders had the tools and ability needed to do the job:

- priority be given to improving teaching and learning
- pupil premium should be spent as intended
- governance should receive external scrutiny.

The school was monitored every sixth month, and the targets were met. The school came out of special measures eighteen months later, improved but not 'Good'

=== The road to a good school ===
The structures and systems were in place and Ian Simpson had gained the trust of the parents and the students had become more self confident, so the next three years were spent implementing the agreed changes. There were more staff changes and the teaching and learning pathways consolidated. Science teaching remained a weak point. There were new intakes of pupils that still came a low starting point, and mid year entries with no English, this was routine and they started to achieve close to the national average. The sixth form became stronger and the subject choice expanded beyond the two popular vocational BTECs. Maths and English GCSE retakes were taught by experienced specialist teachers, with a strong track record for success. Ofsted inspected in 2019 and graded this a 'Good' school.

=== Strategies ===
Oasis has a long-term strategy for enhancing the performance of its schools. It has devised a standard curriculum, that each school can safely adopt knowing it will deliver the National Curriculum. Transformation comes by it has invested in staff training so they are focused on improving the outcomes for the students. The Horizons scheme it is providing each member of staff and student with a tablet, to narrow the widening disparity between the advantaged pupil and the disadvantaged, while allowing the staff to adopt multimedia and on-line teaching material.

== Academics ==
in February 2019 it was graded as a good school by Ofsted, and the then principal praised for transforming the school. Ofsted reported: "He commands the respect of pupils, parents, carers and staff because of his relentless commitment to raising pupils’ aspirations. He establishes consistent expectations of pupils’ behaviour, knows the pupils well and engages very effectively with the local community."

=== Curriculum ===
Virtually all maintained schools and academies follow the National Curriculum, and there success is judged on how well they succeed in delivering a 'broad and balanced curriculum'. Schools endeavour to get all students to achieve the English Baccalaureate (EBACC) qualification- this must include core subjects a modern or ancient foreign language, and either History or Geography.

The academy operates a three-year, Key Stage 3 where all the core National Curriculum subjects are taught. In year nine the subjects move towards those taught in Key Stage 4. There, the focus is on the EBACC, and there are daily Maths, English and Science lessons- plus some options. Urdu and French are the taught Modern Languages.

Knowledge organisers are published for each subject in each year in each term. Students are given Learning pathways to show where the lesson fits in.

Oasis Academy Lister Park offers GCSEs and BTECs as programmes of study for pupils, while students in the sixth form have the option to study from a range of A-levels and further BTECs.

== Neighbouring schools ==
Bradford has had a history of inadequate schools, throughout the 2010 decade.

- Oasis Academy Lister Park
- Tong High School
- Hanson Academy
- BBG Academy
- Bradford Girls Grammar School
- Belle Vue Boys' School in Heaton.
- Carlton Bolling College in Undercliffe.
