= Jonny Pelham =

British comedian and writer

- Born: 1990 or 1991 (age 35–36); Undercliffe, West Yorkshire, England
- Education: Oasis Academy Lister Park; Newcastle University
- Occupation: Stand-up comedian

Jonny Pelham (born 1990 or 1991) is a British comedian and writer. Born in Undercliffe in West Yorkshire, he endured multiple complications from popliteal pterygium syndrome and two years of sexual abuse before attending Newcastle University, where he took up stand-up comedy. After winning several awards and performing several shows at the Edinburgh Festival Fringe, he underwent therapy, which prompted him to address his abuse in both his 2019 stand-up show "Off Limits" and a subsequent appearance on Live at the Apollo. The reaction to the latter caused him to suffer a mental health crisis, which he explored in his 2023 Fringe show "Optimism Over Despair". He has also appeared in Bobby & Harriet Get Married, Late Bloomer, and Brad Boyz, and presented the documentary Let's Talk: Child Sex Abuse.

== Life and career ==
=== Early life and early career ===
Pelham grew up in Undercliffe, a suburb of Bradford in West Yorkshire, and he was one of the very few white people in the area. He has two sisters; their parents were both therapists. He was born with popliteal pterygium syndrome, a condition suffered from by 200 people in the UK. He also required regular surgery on his legs, and spent one summer at Camp Courage. He attended Oasis Academy Lister Park, a school where 80% of the pupils were Muslims, at which he was the only white pupil in his class and the only white member of the youth gang "Blazing Bangladeshis". When he was sixteen, the National Health Service offered him £30,000 worth of cosmetic surgery on his face, despite the procedure coming with multiple risk factors and the country being in recession, which dented his confidence, as he had not previously thought there was anything wrong with it.

Pelham started performing comedy while at Newcastle University. At the time, he was too nervous to ad-lib, so would learn his scripts verbatim. Early attempts were not successful, prompting his agent to send him a How to Write Jokes video; he later improved, and came second in both the Chortle Student Comedian of the Year awards and So You Think You're Funny in 2012, and then the following year he placed third in the Laughing Horse New Act Of The Year competition. The year after that, he was a Chortle Awards nominee for Best Newcomer. He performed three shows at the Edinburgh Festival Fringe between 2015 and 2017: "Before & After", in which he discussed the NHS' offer of facial surgery, "Fool's Paradise", about his experiences of therapy, and "Just Shout Louder", in which he talked about his attempts at dating.

=== "Off Limits" and Live at the Apollo ===
Around 2016, Pelham attended a funeral, which made him question his lack of romantic and sexual experience, prompting him to seek therapy. After his therapist suggested that the topic would be unsuitable for comedy, he interpreted this as a challenge, and after feeling that his 2017 show had been inauthentic, he used his 2019 Fringe show "Off Limits" to talk about the abuse right off the bat;

Off the back of the show, he performed a set about the topic on Live at the Apollo, a BBC One stand-up comedy series, which led to strangers stopping him in the street to tell him about their experiences, which caused him to realise he was not quite as over his experiences as he thought and for him to return to therapy following a mental health crisis. In 2021, Dan Smith of Bastille used a Rolling Stone cover story to assert that his band's fourth album had been inspired by Pelham's 2019 set's discussion of maladaptive daydreaming. During the first COVID-19 lockdown in the United Kingdom, he attempted a few online gigs, but found they were not for him, so spent his time writing, and in 2023, he performed his show "Optimism Over Despair" at the Fringe, which explored his regret at oversharing his abuse on Live at the Apollo.

=== Other works ===
In 2017, Pelham played a fictionalised version of himself in Bobby Mair and Harriet Kemsley's sitcom Bobby & Harriet Get Married, and in 2018, he starred in Late Bloomer, a short for Sky Arts. Later that year, Chortle announced that he would make a sitcom pilot for Channel 4, Blazing Bangladeshis, a semi-autobiographical show about his time in a youth gang of the same name; by broadcast, it had changed its name to Brad Boyz. In 2021, he presented a documentary for Channel 4, Let's Talk: Child Sex Abuse, in which he met, among others, a survivor of Barry Bennell, and a man who was sexually attracted to children but was choosing not to act on his urges.
