= Oasis Academy Brightstowe =

Location
- Penpole Lane; Bristol, BS11 0EB; England; 51.4908°N 2.6698°W

Information
- Type: Academy
- Established: 2008
- Trust: Oasis Community Learning
- Department for Education URN: 135671 Tables
- Ofsted: Reports
- Principal: Andraea Davies
- Gender: Mixed
- Age: 11 to 19
- Enrollment: 811 as of February 2021
- Capacity: 945
- Houses: Opportunity, Ambition, Bravery
- Colours: Blue, pink, purple
- Website: www.oasisacademybrightstowe.org

Oasis Academy Brightstowe is a secondary school with academy status in Bristol, England. It opened in September 2008 in the buildings of the former Portway Community School.

== Sponsors ==
Oasis Academy Brightstowe is sponsored by Oasis Community Learning, which is a separate charity, but is part of the Oasis Global family. Oasis UK, a Christian organisation, was founded by Rev Steve Chalke M.B.E. in 1985, and began its work in the UK but now delivers educational, healthcare and housing projects globally. Oasis Community Learning sponsor over fifty other academies across the UK.

== Description ==
Oasis Academy Brightstowe is Academy for 11- to 19-year-olds, located in Shirehampton in north Bristol. The Academy opened in September 2008 in the redeveloped buildings of the former Portway School. It has about 800 students.

On opening, the school served about 500 11-16 year olds from an area of significant social economic disadvantage. A quarter of students were eligible for free school meals. The vast majority of students are White British and very few speak an ethnic language at home. About a third have special educational needs.

=== Oasis ===
Oasis Academy Brightstowe is part of the Oasis Community Learning group, a Christian charity. The academy has been consistently rated as a 'Good' school.

== Curriculum ==
The academy runs a two year Key Stage 3. Setting, based on Key Stage 2 SATs is employed in the Core Subjects (English, maths, science, humanities and languages), with other subjects being mixed ability.

In the three year Key Stage 4, that is years 9, 10 and 11, there is core subjects with option block system. This is based on choosing the subjects needed for English Baccalaureate, and a good progress 8 benchmark score.

=== Post 16 provision ===
Students progress to the North Bristol Post 16 Centre which is made up of both Redland Green and Cotham Learning Communities, which offer 45 Level 3 courses and a good selection of Level 2 courses.

== Specialism ==
The specialism of the Academy is Mathematics and ICT with Business and Enterprise, and these disciplines are emphasised throughout the curriculum.

== Notable former pupils ==
=== Portway School ===
- Darren Jones, Labour politician
- Robert Melias (born c.1955), the first person to be convicted of rape, with DNA fingerprinting (DNA profiling), of Shirehampton and Avonmouth; he was a convicted petty thief in the early 1970s, and had alcohol and gambling addictions; he was defended by Simon Darwall-Smith; he had absconded and was re-arrested on 11 August 1987 in Weymouth; aged 32 he was jailed for 8 years by Sir Hugh Park on Friday 13 November 1987, being caught by Detective Con Clive Tippetts, after raping a 43 year old woman, with polio, on 29 January 1987 in Avonmouth; six Home Office centres and the Met Police, had scientists trained in DNA fingerprinting
