= Oaklands Community School =

Coordinates: 50.941°N 1.454°W

Location
- Fairisle Road; Southampton, Hampshire; England

Information
- Type: Secondary
- Motto: Achieve What We Want
- Established: September 1982
- Closed: August 2008 (demolished 2013/2014)
- Local authority: Southampton
- Department for Education URN: 116464 Tables
- Ofsted: Reports
- Head teacher: Sarah Howelles
- Gender: Mixed
- Age: 11 to 16
- Website: https://web.archive.org/web/20070621134152/http://www.oaklands.southampton.sch.uk:80/

Oaklands Community School was a mixed comprehensive school in west Southampton, Hampshire, in the south of England. The school served the Lordshill community from 1983 to 2008 for 11 to 16-year-olds. In its later years during 2005 and 2008 it became a specialist Arts College.

The most recent Ofsted inspection was 27 September 2004, when the school was praised, the introduction to the report reading "Oaklands Community School is a very good school. Its exceptional egalitarian ethos ensures that all students are treated with care, respect and encouragement. Very strong leadership, a commitment to equality of opportunity, improvement and raised standards combined with a good quality of education for all students result in a school which provides good value for money."

According to the Department of Education performance tables, the school obtained the fourth-highest CVA score in the city. This is a new, complex Key Stage 2 to Key Stage 4 contextual value added (CVA) score designed to show the progress children have made. This is done by comparing their achievements with those of other pupils nationally who had the same or similar prior attainment in their test results at age 10 or 11 in 2001.

== History ==
The school was built on a seven-acre site, with a mixture of English tithe barn, with strong Japanese influences. The original cost in 1980 was thought to be £1.2 million, however this doubled to £2.4 million.

The school opened in September 1982, though it was officially opened by Anne, Princess Royal the following year in May 1983. The first year, the school saw 400 pupils enroll, with the capacity of the school being 720.

The school closed in August 2008. The premises became the upper school site for Oasis Academy Lord's Hill which has since moved to a new dedicated building. At the same time Millbrook Community School became the lower school site. The school buildings have been demolished apart from the pool and community hall. The land now has planning permission for 103 new homes.

The swimming pool was closed in July 2012 after a leak was found. The Labour council leaders consulted over whether or not it would be economically viable to get it repaired at a cost of £500,000. On 14 February 2014, the work needed to repair and reopen Oaklands swimming pool was approved at a cost of £1.7 million funded by Southampton City Council. The pool was reopened in January 2015.

Dr. Peter Hollis was the longest running head teacher at Oaklands Community School starting in September 1982, after transferring from Shirley Warren Secondary School until he retired in August 2006. Mrs Sarah Howelles took over until the school closed in 2008.
