= Raja Miah =

British charity worker (born 1973)

Raja Miah MBE
- Born: May 1973 (age 53); Oldham, England
- Occupation: Charity worker
- Political party: Independent (since 2024)
- Other political affiliations: Labour Party (until 2019); Failsworth Independent Party (2021); Proud of Oldham and Saddleworth (2021)
- Children: 1
- Website: https://www.rajamiah.com/

Raja Miah MBE (born May 1973) is a British charity worker, activist, and political figure.

== Early life and career ==
Miah was born and raised in Oldham. His parents were Bangladeshi Muslims who had emigrated from Sylhet.

=== Charity work ===
In 1997, Miah co-founded Peacemaker, a charity aimed at promoting community cohesion. The charity received commendation from the Home Office for its efforts following the 2001 Oldham riots.

In the 2004 Birthday Honours, Miah was appointed a Member of the Order of the British Empire for his services to community relations.

He advised the Home Office and Greater Manchester Police on counterterrorism during this time.

In 2011, Peacemaker closed due to financial difficulties linked to the austerity measures.

=== Free schools ===
In 2012, Miah announced plans to establish a free school to enhance local education. He opened two free schools in Greater Manchester: Collective Spirit in 2013 and Manchester Creative School in 2014. Miah was chief executive officer of the academy trust overseeing both institutions. The development of Collective Spirit encountered opposition from local councillors.

In 2016, The Guardian reported that a firm owned by Miah had received £700,000 from the academy trust. Collective Spirit was placed in special measures by Ofsted after an inspection rated it 'inadequate' in all categories.

By 2018, both schools were closed by the Department for Education amid concerns over educational standards, safety, and financial debts. The exam board OCR accused one of the schools of malpractice.

In 2019, local MP Jim McMahon called for an investigation into concerns regarding the schools. That year, the Education and Skills Funding Agency found that the trust's chairman, Alun Morgan, had violated regulations and raised questions about his connections to Miah.

Miah lodged a complaint with the Independent Press Standards Organisation regarding three articles in the Manchester Evening News, which was not upheld.

== Activism and politics ==
=== Campaign against grooming gangs ===
In late 2019, Miah began alleging corruption within Oldham Council and claimed that local Labour Party politicians had covered up grooming gangs in the area. He specifically accused former council leader and MP Jim McMahon, Chief Executive Carolyn Wilkins, Deputy Leader Arooj Shah, and Council Leader Sean Fielding of involvement in such cover-ups. McMahon described these allegations as defamatory.

Miah established three online blogs to publish articles and podcasts, where he discussed alleged cover-ups of grooming gangs and local government corruption. He claimed that Labour politicians had fostered division by relying on a 'cartel-controlled block Asian vote'. Some sources have described Miah as an opportunist who has sought support from far-right groups.

In 2021, Miah was associated with the Failsworth Independent Party and Proud of Oldham and Saddleworth. During the 2021 Oldham Metropolitan Borough Council elections, Labour council leader Sean Fielding lost his seat to Failsworth independent candidate, Mark Wilkinson, by a margin of 191 votes. The Times reported that Miah had disseminated false information on Facebook about Asian cartels intimidating voters at polling stations, as part of wider social media activity involving far-right elements, and that there was "no evidence to suggest that grooming gangs are operating freely in Oldham".

In 2022, an independent assurance review into historic safeguarding practices in Oldham—commissioned by Andy Burnham (who was Mayor of Greater Manchester at the time)—found there was evidence that children were being drugged or made senseless on vodka and then subjected to violent rapes, often by several men in succession, and to serious physical assaults, coercion and threats. The authors of the review, Malcolm Newsam and Gary Ridgway, concluded that "it does appear as if some of these men could exploit these children with relative impunity due to the failure to disrupt and target their activities". Newsam and Ridgway further added that they had "been provided with no evidence, either through our interviews or documentary review, to suggest that senior managers or councillors sought to cover up either the existence of child sexual exploitation in Oldham". In June 2022, following publication of the assurance review, Jim McMahon accused Miah in Parliament of promoting conspiracy theories for financial and political benefit. McMahon also noted that Miah had overseen serious safeguarding failures at the Collective Spirit free school. In July 2022, Maggie Oliver (a former detective in Greater Manchester Police who had investigated the Rochdale child sex abuse ring) denounced the actions of Oldham Council for its apparent attempts to undermine the review. She highlighted one example in which the Council "had told the review team that Sam was not prepared to speak to them as she was suicidal ... This was completely untrue but it clearly shows the depths to which the authorities will still go in their attempts to silence victims and cover up failings and wrongdoings by the police and other statutory agencies."

In January 2025, Elon Musk advocated for an inquiry into grooming gangs in Oldham, sharing posts authored by Miah on X (Twitter).

In December 2025, Miah publicly accused Andy Burnham (then the Mayor of Greater Manchester) on Twitter of commissioning a review that whitewashed historical child sexual abuse in Greater Manchester, erroneously clearing institutions, officials and politicians of wrong-doing. Burnham responded by stating that Miah "regularly makes misleading allegations". In January 2026 the local newspaper, the Oldham Chronicle, published an editorial stating that it believed that Oldham Council had responded to Miah's allegations "defensively rather than transparently" and had employed a broad strategy of "defamation, discrediting and smearing" to suppress scrutiny. The newspaper further expressed it was "deeply worried about criminal influence and misuse of power within local institutions" and suggested that Oldham would be an appropriate starting point for a national inquiry.

=== Legal issues and political involvement ===
In July 2021, Miah was arrested by Greater Manchester Police and charged with malicious communications and harassment. The charge of malicious communications was withdrawn and, in May 2024, a judge dismissed the harassment charge after prosecutors offered no evidence.

During the 2024 United Kingdom general election, Miah stood as an independent candidate in Oldham West, Chadderton and Royton, receiving 6.4% of the vote and placing fifth.

== Personal life ==
Miah has a daughter.

== See also ==
- 2001 Oldham riots
- Child sexual abuse in the United Kingdom
- Grooming gangs scandal
