= Oasis Charitable Trust =

UK-based Christian charity

- Formation: 1985; 41 years ago
- Founder: Steve Chalke
- Founded at: United Kingdom
- Type: Charitable organization
- Legal status: Registered Charity; Company Limited by Guarantee
- Region served: 11 countries: United Kingdom; United States; Bangladesh; Belgium; Burkina Faso; India; Kyrgyzstan; Mozambique; South Africa; Uganda; Zimbabwe
- Services: Anti-trafficking; Churches; Education; Healthcare; Housing; Youth work
- Website: www.oasisuk.org

Oasis Charitable Trust, commonly known as Oasis, is a United Kingdom-based Christian registered charity. It was founded by the Reverend Steve Chalke in September of 1985. Chalke had been assistant minister at Tonbridge Baptist Church, Kent, for four years. He left this job with the aim of setting up a hostel for homeless young people. Oasis now has over 5,000 staff in the United Kingdom as well as thousands more volunteers.

Oasis has developed into a group of charities working on four continents (11 countries) around the world, with the goal of delivering housing, education, training, youthwork and healthcare. Oasis is now a voluntary sector provider, delivering services for local authorities and national governments, as well as self funded initiatives.

== Oasis Church Waterloo ==
In 2003 Oasis became responsible for the buildings of Christ Church and Upton Chapel, in Waterloo, central London, and started working with the existing members there to form what was originally known as Church.co.uk. (now named Oasis Church, Waterloo).

Christ Church and Upton Chapel was founded as Surrey Chapel in 1783, and was a major influence in the start of the ragged school movement – which provided schools for local children from poor homes – and also supported the birth of the Shaftesbury Society, the YMCA and the Bible Society. In the 1800s it was also influential in the anti-slavery movement; William Wilberforce and friends made its building a venue for many of their anti-slavery meetings, and its spire, built in 1867, is named the Lincoln Memorial Tower, donated in memory of Abraham Lincoln who was both inspired and supported by in his work to achieve the emancipation of the slaves of North America through the network of friends based in London.

Since 2003 community services focused on the half-mile radius around the building, have been developed, including a children's centre, a primary school, a secondary school, various adult education opportunities, a food bank, a debt advice centre, a community farm, a coffee shop, as well as becoming responsible for the local public library and launching various other youth projects and programmes.

Further Oasis churches have developed running alongside the communities of Oasis Academies in Salford, Oldham, Brightstowe, Bristol, Enfield, Southampton (Lord's Hill & Mayfield), Immingham and Wintringham.

== Stop The Traffik ==
Stop The Traffik is one of the Oasis subsidiary charities. It is a coalition working in nearly 100 countries and in partnership with multiple other charitable organisations, businesses and anti-trafficking agencies with the goal of disrupting and preventing human trafficking.

== Oasis Community Housing ==
Oasis Community Housing delivers services for vulnerably housed and homeless people, in the North East as well as in South London. Annually it supports over 1000 people with housing needs.

== Oasis Community Learning ==
Oasis Community Learning is a multi-academy trust and one of Oasis Trust's subsidiary charities. It has an UID of 4076. It acts as an umbrella group to govern the Oasis Academies which are schools classed as academies. The first three Oasis academies in Enfield Lock, Grimsby and Immingham, opened in September 2007, with six more, two in Bristol, two in Southampton, two in Croydon and one in Salford, opening in September 2008. Since then, Oasis has grown to be one of the country's largest Multi-Academy Trusts (MATs) and is currently responsible for 53 schools around England; a mix of primary, secondary and all-through academies.

In 2021, Chalke said that the trust has supported forty schools out of special measures.

=== Oasis academies ===
==== Primary ====
- Oasis Academy Aspinal, Gorton, Manchester
- Oasis Academy Bank Leaze, Lawrence Weston, Bristol
- Oasis Academy Blakenhale Infants, Garretts Green, Birmingham
- Oasis Academy Blakenhale Junior, Garretts Green, Birmingham
- Oasis Academy Boulton, Soho, Birmingham
- Oasis Academy Broadoak, Ashton-under-Lyne, Tameside
- Oasis Academy Byron, Coulsdon, London
- Oasis Academy Connaught, Knowle, Bristol
- Oasis Academy Firvale, Sheffield
- Oasis Academy Foundry, Soho, Birmingham
- Oasis Academy Harpur Mount, Harpurhey, Manchester
- Oasis Academy Henderson Avenue, Scunthorpe
- Oasis Academy Hobmoor, Yardley, Birmingham
- Oasis Academy Johanna, Lower Marsh, London
- Oasis Academy Limeside, Limeside, Oldham
- Oasis Academy Long Cross, Lawrence Weston, Bristol
- Oasis Academy Marksbury Road, Bristol
- Oasis Academy New Oak, Bristol
- Oasis Academy Nunsthorpe, Grimsby
- Oasis Academy Parkwood, Scunthorpe
- Oasis Academy Pinewood, Collier Row, London
- Oasis Academy Putney, London
- Oasis Academy Ryelands, South Norwood, London
- Oasis Academy Short Heath, Erdington, Birmingham
- Oasis Academy Skinner Street, Gillingham
- Oasis Academy Warndon, Worcester
- Oasis Academy Watermead, Sheffield
- Oasis Academy Woodview, Edgbaston, Birmingham

==== Secondary ====
- Oasis Academy Arena, South Norwood, London
- Oasis Academy Brightstowe, Shirehampton, Bristol
- Oasis Academy Brislington, Brislington, Bristol
- Oasis Academy Coulsdon, Old Coulsdon, London
- Oasis Academy Daventry Road, Hengrove, Bristol
- Oasis Academy Enfield, Enfield Lock, London
- Oasis Academy Immingham, Immingham
- Oasis Academy Isle of Sheppey, Isle of Sheppey, Kent
- Oasis Academy John Williams, Hengrove, Bristol
- Oasis Academy Leesbrook, Oldham
- Oasis Academy Lister Park, Bradford
- Oasis Academy Lord's Hill, Southampton
- Oasis Academy Mayfield, Southampton
- Oasis Academy MediaCityUK, Salford Quays, Salford
- Oasis Academy Oldham, Hollinwood, Oldham
- Oasis Academy Sholing, Southampton
- Oasis Academy Silvertown, West Silvertown
- Oasis Academy South Bank, Lambeth, London
- Oasis Academy Temple Quarter, Bedminster, Bristol
- Oasis Academy Wintringham, Grimsby

==== All-through ====
- Oasis Academy Don Valley, Attercliffe, Sheffield
- Oasis Academy Hadley, Ponders End, London
- Oasis Academy Shirley Park, Woodside, London

=== Oasis Restore ===
Oasis took over the management of the Medway Secure Training Centre (Medway Children's Prison) from G4S and HM Prisons Service; the facility was scheduled to reopen in March 2021. The focus will be on rehabilitation not retaliation and the children and young people will be called students, not prisoners or inmates. Through education and a co-curriculum, Oasis hopes to develop a pathway for them towards that day that they can follow after they leave. There will be capacity for 64 students aged between 12 and 17 who may be staying from a few days to several years.

In June 2019 the Ministry of Justice announced that they had awarded Oasis the long-term contract to run the UK's first ‘Secure School’. Chalke explains that Oasis will offer a therapeutically informed education and health care based alternative to youth prison. He also recognises that "The challenge is huge...we have been given a massive responsibility. I realise that the reputation of the Ministry of Justice and the reputation of the whole of Oasis depends on this." The Oasis Secure School, which will be known as Oasis Restore, will occupy the site of the Medway Secure Training College (formerly known as Borstal) which was previously run by G4S until 2016 when a BBC Panorama documentary exposed the level of drugs and violence in the jail and the government removed their contract. Oasis Restore will open at the end of May 2024.
