= Mazhar Majeed =

British sporting agent and bookmaker (born 1975)

Mazhar Majeed (born 1975) is a British sporting agent and runs a Talent Management Agency, Star People which is in the business of managing brands, film and TV personalities and sporting athletes. In 2022, Mazhar Majeed became the manager for two time World Boxing Champion, Amir Iqbal Khan. He additionally organized the fight between Amir Khan and Kell Brook on 18 February 2022. Earlier, he came under police investigation in 2010 following reports of cricket 'match fixing' after a News of the World sting operation. On Saturday 28 August 2010, he was arrested by Scotland Yard for allegedly fixing a Test match between England and Pakistan in Lord's. On 3 November 2011, Majeed was given a prison sentence of 32 months on convictions of "conspiracy to make corrupt payments" and "conspiracy to allow others to cheat at gambling," to run concurrently.

== Background ==
Born 1975 in Croydon, England, Majeed attended the Coulsdon High School and studied business at Middlesex University in north London before forming a property development company based in London and Surrey, Majeed was a major shareholder and co-owner of Croydon Athletic F.C. His family migrated to England from Faisalabad, Pakistan. Majeed is married to an Indian wife and is the father of four children.

== Affiliation with Pakistani cricketers ==
Majeed, along with his brother Azhar, was known to the Pakistani players as a sports agent who had worked to secure the Pakistani players lucrative equipment sponsorship deals while the players were playing in the United Kingdom Between 2008 and 2009, the Pakpassion cricket website also had a regular section called "The Agents Views", in which Azhar would update readers on the activities of a number of players. Despite his close relationship to the players, dating back to Pakistan's previous tour of England, the Pakistani players were warned by the Pakistan coaching staff not to associate with Majeed or his brother, and did not want the players to have agents in their rooms.

== Spot-fixing bribe and arrest ==
On 28 August 2010, The English tabloid News of the World published a story with additional video of their undercover reporters offering Majeed £150,000 ($232,665) for information on the ongoing 4th Test Match between England and Pakistan. In the video published by News of the World, Majeed told the undercover reporters that two Pakistani bowlers (Mohammad Asif and Mohammad Amir) would deliberately deliver no-balls at specific points during the match. Majeed stated on the video that Amir would be Pakistan's bowler for the third over, and that the first ball of the over would be a no-ball delivery. Amir did bowl the third over, and on his first delivery from the over, bowled a no-ball delivery. Commentary described the delivery as a "massive overstep", a good half-foot beyond the delivery line. Majeed also predicted that the sixth delivery of the tenth over would be a no-ball, and the ball, delivered by Asif, was also a no-ball delivery.

During the video, Majeed boasted of working with seven of Pakistan's touring squad. Of those seven, on the video he named Amir, Asif, team captain Salman Butt and wicketkeeper Kamran Akmal as those working with him. The other three were not named on the video.

As a result of the allegations, Majeed was arrested on suspicion of conspiracy to defraud bookmakers charges. The next day, Pakistan completed their loss against England by an innings and 225 runs, and Pakistan lost the four match series 3–1.

== Allegations of match fixing ==
On the same video posted by the News of the World, Majeed said that earlier in the year the second Test match between Pakistan and Australia in Sydney had also been fixed. He stated that players had deliberately lost the game after being in a commanding position (Australia were only up 10 runs with two second innings wickets left, and Pakistan had yet to bat). Majeed has now stated that the odds against an Australian victory had gone as high as 40–1, and that the fixers had made over a million pounds from the resulting wagers.
