= Oasis Academy John Williams =

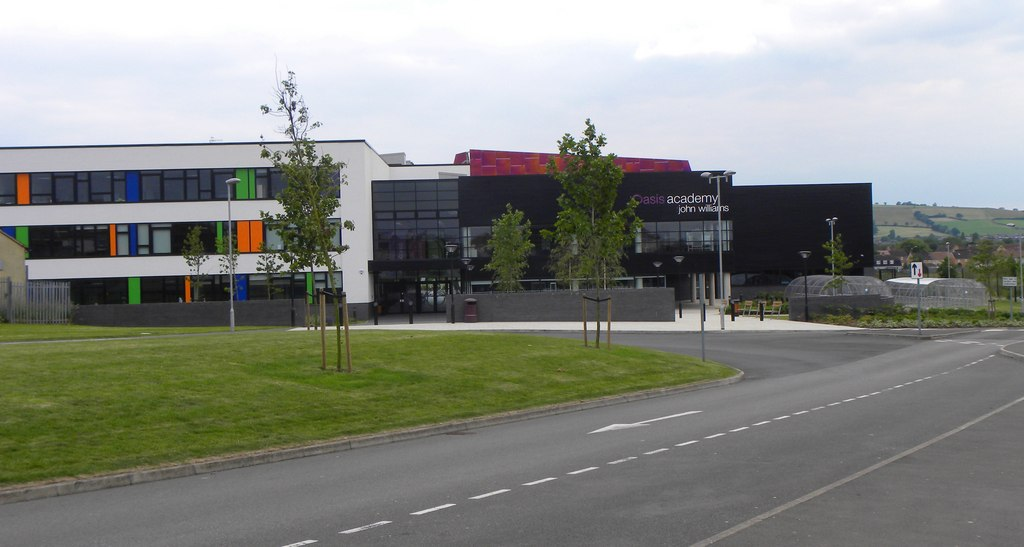

Location
- Petherton Road; Hengrove, Bristol, BS14 9BU; England; 51.4196°N 2.5663°W

Information
- Type: Academy
- Established: September 2008 (as Oasis Academy Bristol)
- Founder: John Williams
- Department for Education URN: 135663 Tables
- Ofsted: Reports
- Principal: Victoria Boomer-Clark
- Gender: Mixed
- Age: 11 to 16 as of September 2016
- Enrollment: 847
- Capacity: 1010
- Colour: Purple
- Website: www.oasisacademyjohnwilliams.org

Oasis Academy John Williams is a secondary school with an academy status in the Hengrove district of Bristol, England. Opened in 2008, it is run by Oasis Community Learning.

The academy serves Hengrove and the surrounding areas. A small majority of the students are from one of the most deprived wards in the country, Filwood, and one third of students are eligible for free school meals and thus pupil premium. As of 2013, almost all students are White British and very few speak English as an additional language.

== History ==
Before 2008, the school was known as Hengrove Community Arts College and then Oasis Academy Bristol, before adopting its current name in September 2010, in tribute of the school's founding Principal, John Williams, who had died of a heart attack.

In 2008 the school converted to being an academy and joined the Oasis Community Learning multi-academy trust. The unexpected death of John Williams necessitated a management restructuring, and vice-principal Rebecca Clark became principal at the age of 31, and the youngest head-teacher in the country. The school opened in the former schools building then moved into new-build in July 2010. It serves a deprived area of Bristol. Rebecca Clarke took on the role of national education director and South West regional director for Oasis Community Learning, then in April 2016 became Ofsteds regional commissioner of schools for the South West of England.

In 2013 Ofsted rated this a 'Good' school. In 2016 the governors decided not to run a sixth form (Key Stage 5): in a 'short inspection' in 2017, Ofsted confirmed it was still a 'Good' school.

== Curriculum ==
Virtually all maintained schools and academies follow the National Curriculum, and their success is judged on how well they succeed in delivering a 'broad and balanced curriculum'. Schools endeavour to get all students to achieve the English Baccalaureate(EBACC) qualification; this must include core subjects a modern or ancient foreign language, and either History or Geography.

The academy operates a three-year Key Stage 3. Students arrive from the primary schools with lower than average attainment. In Year 7 and Year 8, they study all core National Curriculum subjects. After a transition period in Year 9, they are guided to select two non-core subjects that they will follow through to GCSE.

At Key Stage 4, the focus is on the EBACC and the curriculum is narrowed further; Maths, English and Science plus two options. Spanish is the taught Modern Language. History or geography must be one of the options. Triple science is available by invitation only.
