= South Chadderton School =

Coordinates: 53.5236°N 2.1595°W

Location
- Butterworth Lane; Chadderton, Greater Manchester; England

Information
- Type: Secondary
- Local authority: Metropolitan Borough of Oldham
- Staff: 54
- Gender: Co-educational
- Age: 11 to 16
- Enrolment: 720 (approx.)
- Website: http://www.southchadderton.oldham.sch.uk/

South Chadderton School was a co-educational secondary school in Chadderton, Greater Manchester, England. The school catered for children aged 11–16.

South Chadderton was a Full Service Extended School worked in close collaboration with the City Learning Centre and Whitegate End infant and primary schools, with which the school shared the campus. The school had access to a considerable range of resources for working parents and families to support learning beyond the school day.

In 2007, staff went on strike after a teacher was suspended as part of an investigation into the publication of a diary detailing the bad behaviour of pupils.

In 2012 South Chadderton amalgamated with Kaskenmoor School to become Oasis Academy Oldham. The school is now located in Hollinwood, and its former site was used by Collective Spirit Free School until its closure in July 2017.
