= Stop the Traffik =

Anti human trafficking campaign

STOP THE TRAFFIK was founded in 2006 by Steve Chalke MBE as a campaign coalition aiming to end human trafficking worldwide. Initially, STOP THE TRAFFIK was established as a two-year campaign to coincide with the bicentenary of the Abolition of the Slave Trade Act (1807). The campaign focuses on raising awareness around human trafficking and its effects, while also fundraising for anti-human trafficking organisations.

== Aims ==
STOP THE TRAFFIK's Centre for Intelligence-Led Prevention collects and analyses data on human trafficking patterns worldwide. Global campaigns, informed by local partnerships, use this intelligence to build resilience and transform communities vulnerable to trafficking. This systemic disruption of trafficking networks also informs businesses and consumers about the presence of modern slavery in global supply chains, empowering consumers to make informed purchasing decisions and equipping businesses to identify and mitigate human trafficking risks.

Across the UK, STOP THE TRAFFIK has established Modern Slavery Hubs with the support of dedicated volunteers. These hubs facilitate collaboration among law enforcement agencies, government bodies, local authorities and NGOs to enhance coordination at both strategic and tactical levels. Embedded Modern Slavery Coordinators serve as links between these hubs and vulnerable communities, providing education and raising awareness among frontline professionals. It aims to empower front line professional communities to inform this resilience through commissioned education and awareness raising sessions.

== Past projects ==
Chocolate campaign

From 2006 to 2010 the organisation ran a campaign focused on ending child trafficking in the cocoa industry, with a particular emphasis on major cocoa-growing nations in West Africa, especially Côte d'Ivoire, which accounts for over one-third of the world’s cocoa production.

The campaign achieved some success, with several major chocolate manufacturers committing to ethical sourcing:

- Mars pledged to make its Galaxy bar Traffik Free by 2010 and its entire global range by 2020.
- Verkade (Netherlands) committed to 100% fair trade cocoa and sugar in its chocolate bars starting in autumn 2008
- Swiss Noir (Netherlands) committed to using Fairtrade cocoa from March 2009
- Cadbury committed to producing Fairtrade Dairy Milk bars in the UK and Ireland from autumn 2009.

Active Communities against Trafficking (ACT)

STOP THE TRAFFIK runs an ongoing community-based project called ACT, which focuses on mobilizing local communities against human trafficking. The organisation states: "Trafficking starts in a community and it can be stopped by the community." The project encourages the formation of ACT groups, which work to identify and share knowledge about trafficking in their communities. These groups then use their understanding to take proactive steps to combat trafficking locally.

Start Freedom project

Launched in October 2009 in collaboration with the United Nations and the Serious Organised Crime Agency, Start Freedom is an educational initiative designed to raise global awareness about trafficking. The program provides educational resources in over 10 languages, which have been downloaded in 97 countries.

During Start Freedom Week in March 2010, young people worldwide engaged their communities through street theatre, film, dance, art, writing, and photography. The project also hosted the world’s first Global Classroom on Human Trafficking, where 180 young people from five continents interacted with experts to learn more about human trafficking and how they could take action in their communities. The initiative aims to expand further, focusing on vulnerable groups and low-income communities in cooperation with NGOs.

Business Travelers Against Trafficking

This initiative aims to educate international travelers on how to identify and report suspected cases of human trafficking. The Business Travelers website offers resources for reporting suspicious activity, reading trafficking-related stories, and networking with other travelers.

As part of this project, STOP THE TRAFFIK issued Business Traveler Wallet Cards, which contain contact details for major international police agencies and the project’s website.

In March 2009, STOP THE TRAFFIK published its first book, STOP THE TRAFFIK: People Shouldn’t Be Bought and Sold, written by Steve Chalke with a chapter by Cherie Blair. The book explores human trafficking and human rights issues.

Other activities

STOP THE TRAFFIK also delivers specialized training programs tailored to professionals and authorities who may encounter trafficking victims or perpetrators. These programs cover four key areas:

- What is human trafficking?
- What is being done to combat human trafficking?
- How can trafficking be identified and reported?
- How can communities take action against trafficking?

The organization also launched the Freedom Ticket for Life initiative, which supports projects in high-risk trafficking regions. The campaign addresses gender disparities in education by providing opportunities for girls in Kyrgyzstan, Tanzania, and Thailand. Additionally, child sponsorship programs are available in Thailand, the Philippines, Bangladesh, Uganda, and India.

STOP THE TRAFFIK also spearheaded anti-trafficking efforts surrounding the 2012 London Olympic Games, warning that major events often increase trafficking risks. In 2011, the organization hosted a Global Summit on Human Trafficking, bringing together world leaders, law enforcement agencies, and grassroots activists to develop strategies for preventing trafficking before, during, and after the Games. The summit established a model for local communities worldwide, fostering partnerships between decision-makers and activists.

Key Milestones

- Freedom Day (25 March 2007): Thousands of people worldwide participated in awareness-raising activities to mark the bicentenary of the abolition of transatlantic slavery.
- UN Global Forum on Human Trafficking: STOP THE TRAFFIK presented a petition with 1.5 million signatures at the United Nations’ first-ever global anti-trafficking forum.
- Celebrity and Political Support: Over 200 Members of the European Parliament and numerous high-profile celebrities signed STOP THE TRAFFIK’s declaration.
- Becoming an Independent Charity (2008): STOP THE TRAFFIK transitioned into an independent international charity. Founder Steve Chalke was appointed UN Special Advisor on Community Action Against Trafficking.
- International People’s Lecture on Human Trafficking (November 2008): Hosted in London, the event featured speakers such as human rights lawyer Cherie Booth QC, UNODC Executive Director Antonio Maria Costa, and Steve Chalke.

== Awards ==
STOP THE TRAFFIK won the Advocacy Award in the New Statesman New Media Awards.
