= Collective Spirit =

Collective Spirit Free School

Location
- Butterworth Lane; Chadderton, Greater Manchester, OL9 8EA; England; 53.5236°N 2.1595°W

Information
- Type: Secondary School
- Motto: A faith sensitive small school
- Religious affiliation: All
- Established: 2013
- Closed: 2017
- Local authority: Oldham
- Department for Education URN: 139970 Tables
- Ofsted: Reports
- Gender: Coeducational
- Age: 11 to 16
- Enrolment: 203
- Website: collectivespirit.org.uk

Collective Spirit Free School was a secondary school in South Chadderton, Oldham. It opened in 2013 on the old site of South Chadderton School. The school had 4 year groups (Year 7, 8, 9 and 10). The school had around 210 students.

== History ==
Collective Spirit Free School was opened in September 2013 on the old site of South Chadderton School which joined with Kaskenmoor School to create Oasis Academy Oldham in 2012. The opening of the school was controversial due to it being the first Free school in the Borough of Oldham to be opened. The school was given the green light in 2012 and opened in September 2013 with 50 Year 7 students. The CEO of the academy trust that operated the school was Raja Miah, who also served as school governor.

In May 2016, Collective Spirit Free School had its first Ofsted inspection. The school was rated inadequate in all areas and there were even calls by local MP Jim McMahon to close down the school and send students to other mainstream secondary schools in the area. As a result of this, the school closed in July 2017.

== Ofsted ==
Collective Spirit Free School came under heavy controversy because it was the first free school to be opened in the borough of Oldham. In June 2016, the Ofsted report for the school was released, and it was rated inadequate which is the lowest grade a school can receive. Local MP Jim McMahon pleaded for the school to be closed saying that students weren't being given an acceptable standard of education and that students felt unsafe due to bullying and fighting, also adding that the school didn't even have a library. He went on to say it was one of the 'most damming' Ofsted reports he's ever seen.
