= Millbrook Community School =

Coordinates: 50.935°N 1.454°W

Location
- Green Lane; Southampton, Hampshire, SO16 9RG; England

Information
- Closed: 2008
- Local authority: Southampton
- Specialist: Science
- Head teacher: Tony Cotton
- Gender: Coeducational
- Age: 11 to 16
- Enrolment: 430
- Colours: White & Grey
- Website: http://www.millbrook.southampton.sch.uk/

Millbrook Community School was a secondary school in Southampton, England. The school was situated close to the west border of the city – formerly Millbrook Secondary School for Boys and attracted pupils from several surrounding areas.

In early 1997 the school was granted a Sports Lottery Board award of £1.53 million. From late summer 1998 the local community and pupils were able to use some additional facilities in the school. These included: floodlit courts, a sports hall, a gymnasium with a sprung wooden floor, a fully equipped fitness suite, a meeting room, a community lounge, offices and a reception area. All these areas were accessible to people with disabilities.

The school was last inspected by OFSTED in September 2006.

As part of Southampton City Council's review of secondary schooling in the city, called Learning Futures, the school closed in September 2008. From September 2008 the school site has acted as the lower school of Oasis Academy Lord's Hill, while the former Oaklands Community School site is the upper school, until new premises are built around 2012, when both existing sites will close.
