= Oasis Academy Lord's Hill =

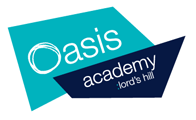

Location
- Romsey Road; Southampton, Hampshire, SO16 8BY; England; 50.9406°N 1.4560°W

Information
- Type: Academy
- Established: 2008
- Trust: Oasis Community Learning
- Department for Education URN: 135628 Tables
- Ofsted: Reports
- Principal: Simon Firth
- Gender: Mixed
- Age: 11 to 16
- Enrolment: 690
- Capacity: 900
- Website: www.oasisacademylordshill.org

Oasis Academy Lord's Hill is an academy situated in the city of Southampton, Hampshire and specialises in Arts. Oasis Academy Lord's Hill replaced Millbrook Community School and Oaklands Community School, which both closed in August 2008.

== History ==
The academy opened in September 2008 in the buildings on the two sites of the closed schools, then moved to a new building in 2012. On merging, most students were White British heritage and the number speaking another language at home was low. About 60% of the school pupils were boys. Around 50% of the students had special educational needs and/or disabilities but no statement.

== Description ==
Oasis Academy Lord's Hill is run by Oasis Community Learning, a foundation established by the Oasis Trust, an evangelical Christian charity.

== Admissions ==
The academy caters for around 700 students in the 11–16 age range, as of 2020.
