= Oasis Academy Silvertown =

Location
- North Woolwich Rd; London, E16 2BB; England

Information
- Type: Free school
- Religious affiliation: Islam
- Established: September 2014
- Local authority: Newham Council
- Trust: Oasis Community Learning
- Department for Education URN: 141082 Tables
- Ofsted: Reports
- Principal: Emily Boxer
- Gender: Mixed
- Age range: 11–16
- Enrolment: 447 (January 2023)
- Capacity: 450
- Website: www.oasisacademysilvertown.org

Oasis Academy Silvertown is a coeducational secondary free school located in Silvertown in Newham, in London, England. It is part of the Oasis Community Learning. It opened to pupils in September 2014.It was rated 'Good' in its first Ofsted inspection in 2017.

== History ==
Oasis Academy Silvertown opened in September 2014. It is smaller than the average-sized mixed comprehensive school within the Oasis Community Learning multi-academy trust. Since it opened, the school has moved between temporary sites and is currently located on Rymill Street. Physical education takes place at Newham Leisure Centre, as there is no on-site sports hall or playing field. Through the trust, the school has received support from other Oasis Community Learning schools.

Oasis has a long term strategy for enhancing the performance of its schools.

- It has devised a standard curriculum, that each school can safely adopt knowing it will deliver the National Curriculum.
- It has invested in staff training so they are focused on improving the outcomes for the students
- Horizons, through its Horizons scheme it is providing each member of staff and student with a tablet computer.

=== Future building ===
In 2022, the school will move to its permanent site on North Woolwich Road, close to West Silvertown DLR station. It is being designed by Rivington Street Studios to BB103 Area Guidelines for Schools and will achieve a BREEAM “Excellent” rating. It is to be a 5 storey 'super block', built on the site of a former fire station. Construction began in October 2020, with the building topped out in July 2021.
