= St Mark's Church of England School, Southampton =

St Mark's Church of England School

Location
- Stafford Road; Southampton, SO15 5TE; 50°54′57″N 1°25′25″W

Information
- Former name: St Mark's Church of England Primary School
- Type: Voluntary controlled school
- Motto: One school. Serving all. Through excellence.
- Religious affiliation: Church of England
- Local authority: Southampton
- Trust: Southampton Co-operative Learning Trust
- Department for Education URN: 116342 Tables
- Ofsted: Reports
- Executive headteacher: Stephanie Bryant
- Gender: Coeducational
- Age: 4 to 16
- Enrolment: 1140
- Capacity: 1320
- Head of Primary: Lorraine Hoad
- Head of Secondary: Ben Godber
- Diocese: Winchester
- Website: https://www.stmarksschool.co.uk/

St Mark's Church of England School, formerly known as St Mark's Church of England Primary School, is a Church of England all-through school in Shirley, Southampton, England.

St Mark's was a primary school but was demolished and renovated by Morgan Sindall to form an all-through school. The project started in 2020. The all-through school was opened by Debbie Sellin, the Bishop of Southampton, in 2022 and was fully completed in 2023. It made history by becoming Southampton's first all-through school.

St Mark's is operated under the auspices of the Diocese of Winchester. Rated "Good" by Ofsted, it is currently educating students from ages 4 to 16. The school's catchment area includes Shirley, St Mary's, and other areas of Southampton.

== History ==
The school was originally called "Millbrook Central Board School" and was constructed in 1894 and opened in 1895. At the start boys, girls and infants learned at the same school. However, in 1909, the school split by gender and age. Additionally in 1988, St Mark's Primary School was founded. In 2020, the government initiated a project to make a new all-through school which was completed in 2022.

== The building expansion ==
In 2020, planning permission was granted for the redevelopment of the school. The plan was to replace the outdated Victorian building and build a new all-through school for 1,346 pupils aged 4–16. So then the previous St Mark's C of E Primary School was demolished in 2020 to make way for Southampton's first all-through school. Now the expanded school has made 900 needed secondary places with 180 per year groups alongside a pre-school offering 24 places and 420 primary places.
