= Tovey Professor of Music =

Named chair at the University of Edinburgh

The Tovey Professorship of Music was established as a named chair at the University of Edinburgh by an ordinance (no. 550) approved by the University Court in 1965 and by the Privy Council the following year. The first person appointed to the chair was Michael Tilmouth, in 1971. He died in 1987. The next appointment was Simon Frith, OBE, who held the chair from 2006 until retiring in 2017.
