= Kaskenmoor School =

Former English Secondary School

Location
- Roman Road; Hollinwood, Greater Manchester, OL8 3PT; England
- 53.5147°N 2.1389°W

Information
- Type: Community
- Closed: August 2010
- Local authority: Oldham
- Department for Education URN: 105732 Tables
- Head teacher: John Alder
- Gender: Mixed
- Age range: 11–16
- Capacity: 900

Kaskenmoor School was a mixed gender comprehensive secondary school for 11- to 16-year-old children in the Hollinwood area of Oldham in Greater Manchester, England. It also had a 6th form consisting of the Upper and Lower 6th, catering for 16 to 18 year olds who studied for their A levels.

The school had approximately 750 pupils in attendance. When it opened in the mid-1960s, Kaskenmoor was an amalgamation of Greenhill Grammar School and Hollinwood Secondary Modern School, and was called Kaskenmoor Comprehensive School. The top three classes were grammar school classes and the bottom three were secondary modern classes, each for the most part keeping their own teachers. The headmaster Mr. Edwin Grey, and the teachers from the grammar school continued to wear their gowns at morning assembly and some in class too.

The school uniform was modernised in line with the 1960s fashion. The school blazer was collar-less in charcoal with a green ribbon trim, and straw boaters were introduced, but short-lived. Summer dresses were no longer old fashioned gingham shirt-waisters, but a bold design, in two tone green, shift dress.

The school had a state of the art craft block which included ceramics, art, metalwork and woodwork. The new building was featured on a BBC TV documentary.

In 1990, The Times Educational Supplement reported that the Kaskenmoor School had a "surprisingly progressive style of management" that combined "proven methods with something more participatory and responsive".

In 2005 Park Dean, Marland Fold and Hill Top Special schools joined the Kaskenmoor campus founding the new special education school New Bridge. Kaskenmoor's motto was "Building a Community of Learners". Because the school was built on marshlands of Oldham there were four separate buildings in the campus.

By 2007, Kaskenmoor had gone from having a 25-percent ethnic minority population among pupils, to having a 93-percent white population. This was attributed to several factors, including a recent intake of white children from Manchester, as well as the reluctance of families to send their children to a school where they would be part of a tiny minority.

In 2009, Kaskenmoor was amalgamated with South Chadderton School to become Oasis Academy Oldham.

In 2015, Hollinwood Academy, a school operated by the New Bridge Multi Academy Trust, opened on the former Kaskenmoor School site.
