= David Tarttelin =

English painter (1929–2021)

- Born: 22 June 1929; Grimsby, Lincolnshire, England
- Died: 14 October 2021 (aged 92); Grimsby, Lincolnshire, England
- Education: Slade School of Fine Art
- Known for: Painting
- Spouse: Kitty Pearson (m. 1951)

David Thomas Geoffrey Tarttelin (22 June 1929 – 14 October 2021) was an English painter.

== Early life and education ==
David Thomas Geoffrey Tarttelin was born in Grimsby, Lincolnshire, England, on 22 June 1929. As a child during World War II, Tarttelin was evacuated from Grimsby to Kirkstead, near Woodhall Spa, and attended Queen Elizabeth's Grammar School, Horncastle. He lived on a working farm which functioned with horse-drawn machinery, aspects of which have informed his work since.

Returning to Grimsby at the end of the war, he studied at Wintringham Grammar School, where he was taught by the artist Ernest Worrall who encouraged him to apply for University College London's Slade School of Fine Art. He was accepted for the school at the age of 17, and studied under Randolph Schwabe and Sir William Coldstream. While at the school he was awarded a prize for watercolour landscape by the critic and art historian Eric Newton. Tarttelin returned to Grimsby and, with the exception of Army Service, has lived and worked there since.

== Personal life and death ==
In 1951, Tarttelin married Catherine Mary "Kitty" Pearson in Grimsby 1951. He died in Grimsby on 14 October 2021, aged 92.
