= Michael Tilmouth =

English musicologist (1930-1987)

- Born: 30 November 1930
- Died: 12 November 1987 (aged 56)

Michael Tilmouth (30 November 1930 – 12 November 1987) was an English musicologist.

== Biography ==
Born in Grimsby, Michael Tilmouth was educated at Christ's College, Cambridge, graduating in 1954 and completing his doctoral studies in 1960 with his thesis Chamber music in England, 1675–1720.

He was appointed an assistant lecturer at the University of Glasgow in 1959; promotion to lecturer followed in 1962, before he was appointed to the new Tovey Chair of Music at the University of Edinburgh in 1971.

Alongside editions of 17th- and 18th-century chamber music, he edited Musica Britannica, contributing two volumes of Matthew Locke's chamber music.

== Death ==
He died in the office on 12 November 1987, aged 56.
