= Oasis Academy South Bank =

Location
- 75 Westminster Bridge Road; London, SE1 7HS; England; 51.4985°N 0.1118°W

Information
- Type: Free school
- Established: September 2013
- Local authority: Lambeth Council
- Trust: Oasis Community Learning
- Department for Education URN: 139659 Tables
- Ofsted: Reports
- Principal: Anna Richardson
- Gender: Mixed
- Age range: 11–18
- Enrolment: 699 ( February 2021)
- Capacity: 720
- Website: www.oasisacademysouthbank.org

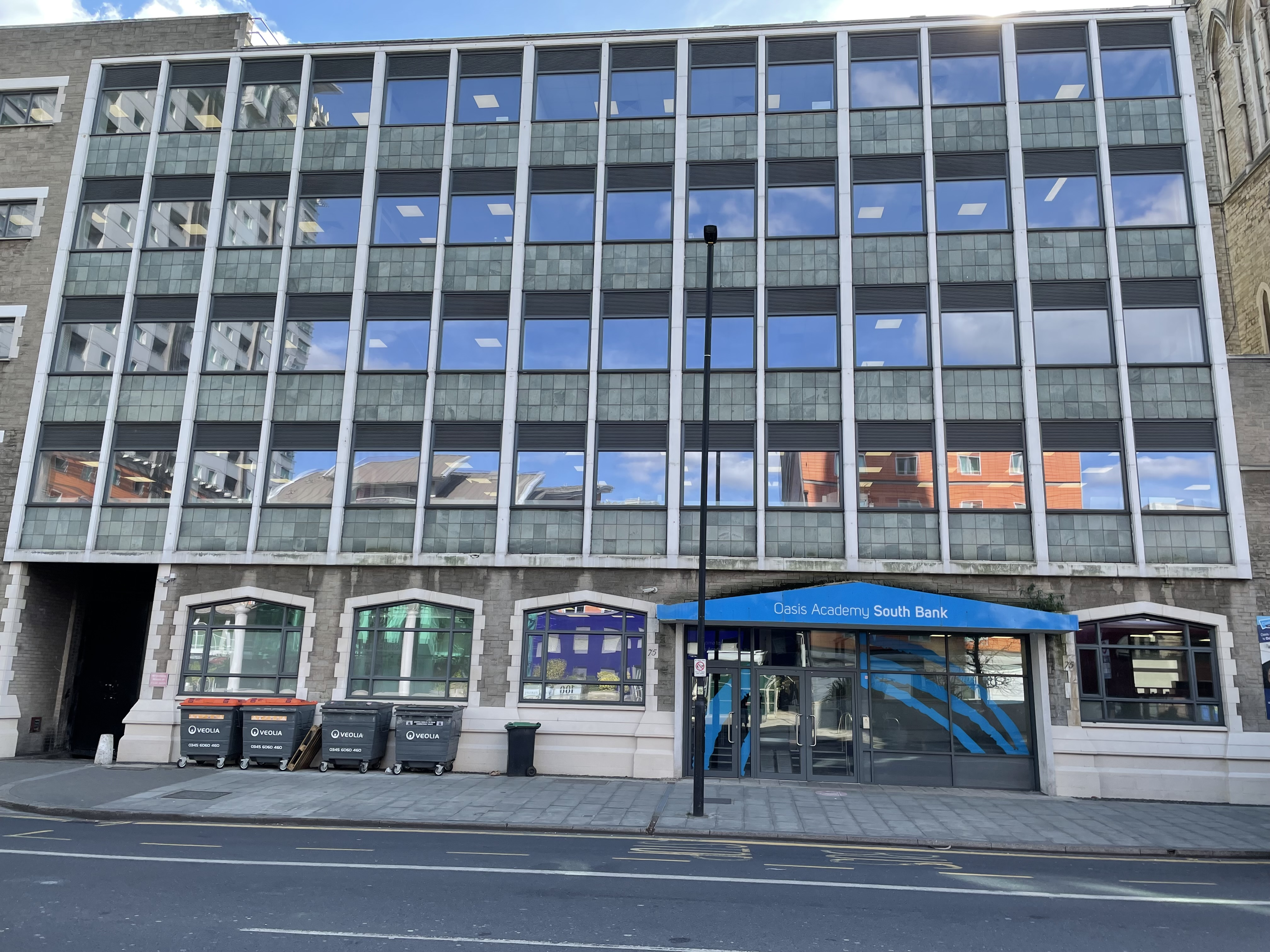
Oasis Academy South Bank, view from Westminster Bridge Road

Oasis Academy South Bank is a free school in Lambeth, London, England. It is coeducational secondary school with sixth-form opened and run by Oasis Community Learning. It opened to pupils in September 2013 and was fully operational by September 2016. Oasis Academy South Bank was rated 'Outstanding' in its first Ofsted inspection.

== Description ==
Oasis Academy South Bank is part of the Oasis Community Learning group, an evangelical Christian charity. The trust has guided 40 schools out of special measures, with 19 per cent of the 52 Oasis academies classified as failing.

Oasis Academy South Bank is Oasis Community Learning group flagship free school, situated next to the Waterloo Hub. The building was converted in three phases from an office block by Gleeds. It was completed in May 2016. The Ofsted Report of June 2015 validated Oasis opinion of how a school should operate, and rated it to be 'Outstanding'.

Oasis has a long-term strategy for enhancing the performance of its schools. Firstly, it has devised a standard curriculum that each school can safely adopt knowing it will deliver the National Curriculum. Secondly, it has invested in staff training, so they are focused on improving the outcomes for the students, and thirdly, through its Horizons scheme each staff member and student is provided with a tablet.

== Academics ==
The school operates an extended school day with compulsory enrichment activities. The extended day gives the pupils more time to learn and prepares them for future employment. The guidelines are described by the Home Academy Agreement which is signed by parents. The academic focus is explained to the students in the acronym STAIRS- scholarship, transformation, aspiration, inclusion, resilience and social responsibility.

=== Curriculum intent ===
A Knowledge-rich curriculum is taught. Oasis was one of 11 schools involved in a funded government pilot scheme to write a full curriculum that interpreted the National Curriculum for England to produce the best outcomes for their students. The results can be seen on the school website.

Virtually all maintained schools and academies follow the National Curriculum; their success is judged on how well they succeed in delivering a 'broad and balanced curriculum'. South Bank endeavour to get 95% students to achieve the English Baccalaureate qualification- this must include core subjects a modern or ancient foreign language, and either History or Geography.

The academy operates a three-year, Key Stage 3 where all the core National Curriculum subjects are taught. This is a transition period from primary to secondary education, that builds on the skills, knowledge and understanding gained at primary school, and introduces youngsters who are starting from a lower than average base to wider, robust and challenging programmes of study needed to gain qualifications at Key Stage 4.

At Key Stage 4 the focus is on the English Baccalaureate, and there are daily Maths, English and Science lessons- plus some options. Spanish and French are the taught modern languages.

In Key Stage 5 Students are expected to study for three A levels and 5 hrs private study on the school site, or do four A levels.

== Location ==
Oasis Community Learning, Oasis Academy Joanna and the Oasis Waterloo Hub are based at 75 Westminster Bridge Road in Lambeth near Southwark.
