= Steve Chalke =

British Baptist minister (born 1955)

The Reverend Canon Steve Chalke MBE FRSA
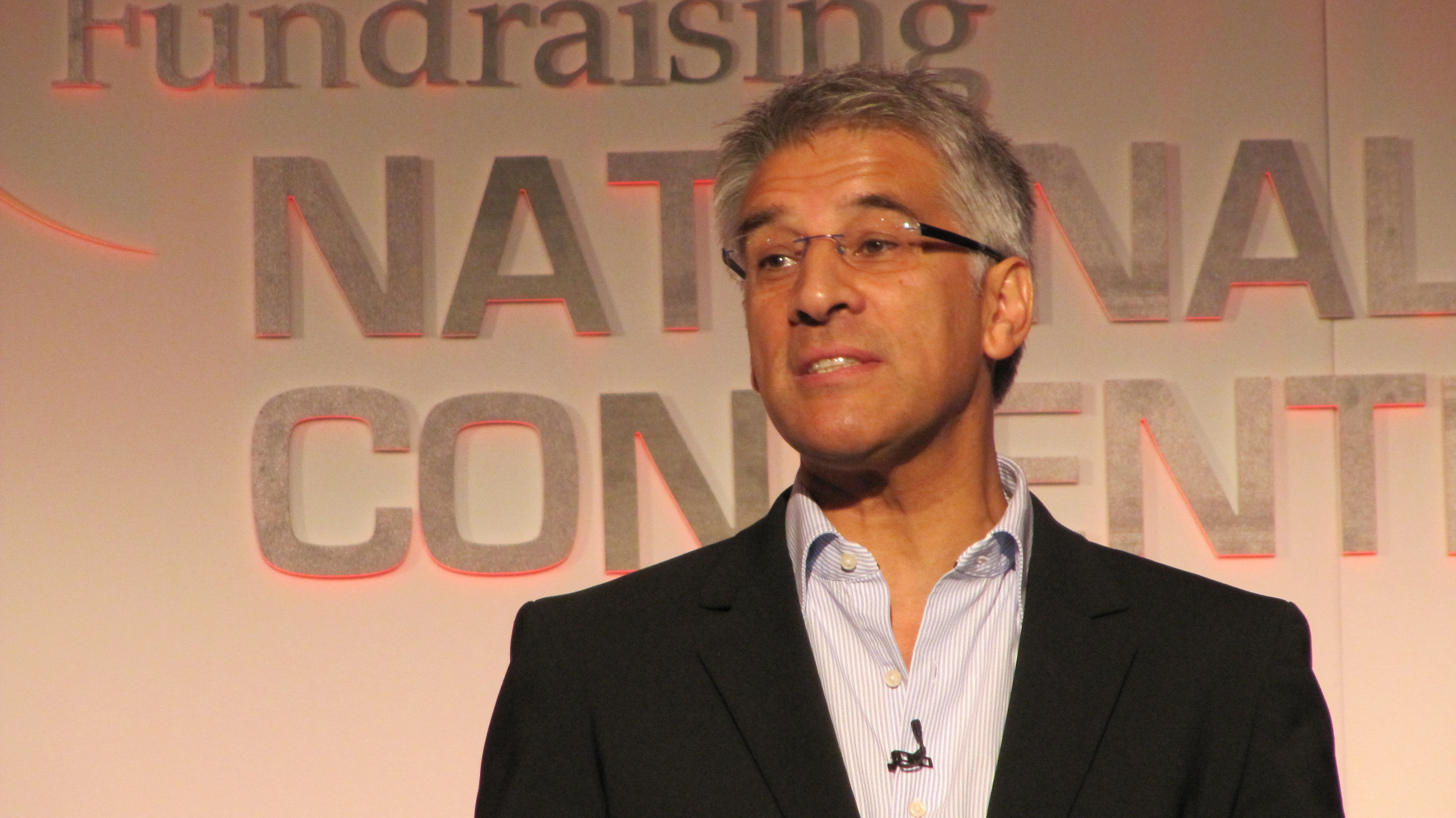
- Born: Stephen John Chalke; 17 November 1955 (age 70); London, England
- Education: Spurgeon's College
- Known for: Founding Oasis Charitable Trust
- Spouse: Cornelia Chalke (m. 1980)

Ecclesiastical career
- Religion: Christianity (Baptist)
- Ordained: 1981
- Offices held: Senior Minister of Oasis Church, London

Stephen John Chalke MBE FRSA (born 17 November 1955) is a British Baptist minister, the founder of the Oasis Charitable Trust, a former United Nations' Special Adviser on Human Trafficking, and a social activist.

Chalke is the author of a large number of books and articles as well as a former presenter and now regular contributor and commentator on television, radio and other media.

== Early life and career ==
Chalke was born in Croydon, South London, in 1955. As a teenager he became a Christian and decided to dedicate his life working to end poverty. He graduated from Spurgeon's College in South Norwood, was ordained a Baptist minister in 1981, and served as a local minister for four years. In 1985 he founded the Oasis Trust to set up housing, healthcare and educational projects.

Oasis has since developed into a group of charities that currently operate in nine countries across Europe, Asia, and Africa, providing housing, education, healthcare, training, youth work, and family support. It has grown into a significant voluntary sector provider, delivering services for local authorities and national governments as well as self-funded initiatives. In the UK, Oasis' family of charities now includes Oasis Community Learning, Oasis Community Housing, Oasis Community Partnerships and Stop the Traffik as well as a growing network of Oasis churches. In the United Kingdom alone, Oasis now employs over 5,000 staff as well as working with thousands more volunteers.

== Church leader ==
After ordination as a Baptist minister in 1981, Chalke was minister of Tonbridge Baptist Church in Kent for four years before setting up the Oasis Trust. He later formed a developing network of community churches around the UK which began with the foundation of Oasis Church Waterloo, London SE1, in 2003 and now includes churches in Salford, Bath, Hull and Reading as well as a growing number of other locations. Chalke served as founding minister of Oasis Church Waterloo from 2003 to 2023, in the London Borough of Lambeth where Oasis currently also serves its local community through the delivery of a children's centre, a primary school, a secondary school, various adult education opportunities, a foodbank, a drop-in debt advice centre, a community farm, the local public library, a range of youth work schemes and a breadth of other community building programmes.

== Housing ==
In the late 1980s Chalke set up Oasis' first housing project, developed to accommodate homeless young people living in South London and to support them on their journey to independent housing. In the late 1990s Chalke began working with a group of churches in his home town of Croydon, as well as in partnership with Croydon London Borough Council to establish the Croydon Foyer. The foyer, which opened in 2000, was accredited through the Foyer Federation, provided housing and training for homeless people aged 18 to 25.

Although the Croydon Foyer has now closed, the provision of housing for vulnerable people has continued to be a priority for Chalke and Oasis. As a result, in April 2014 Oasis Housing formally merged with another homelessness charity known as Aquila Way to become what is now known as Oasis Community Housing, one of the Oasis UK subsidiary charities. It now supports around 1,200 vulnerable young people into housing each year as well as providing a range of other services.

== Educator ==
From its early days Oasis has been involved in the provision of education not only in the UK but also in Asia and Africa.

In the UK early in the 1990s, Oasis also began to develop professional training for youth workers. By 2009, this had grown into a range of academically and professionally validated short courses, undergraduate and postgraduate programmes of study in children's work, youth work and family practice and the Oasis College for Higher Education was established in central London.

In 2004 Chalke set up Oasis Community Learning as part of the Oasis Group of charities in order to deliver secondary education through the UK Government's Academies programme. Today Oasis is responsible for 54 primary, secondary or all-through academies across England.

In 2022, the UK government appointed Oasis, the Harris Federation, Star Academies, and Outwood Grange Academies Trust to develop the National Institute of Teaching. The Department for Education stated that the Institute was founded by four school trusts with a history of assisting teachers and leaders in their career development and working with children in local communities. Its purpose is to influence the quality of teaching and school leadership by conducting research, applying results to professional development programs, and sharing findings with the education sector.

== Health care ==
When in September 1993, an earthquake devastated the Latur district in Maharashtra, India, Chalke, who was working as a presenter for GMTV (Good Morning Television), suggested to Peter McHugh, the Director of Programmes, that the station should run an appeal to build a hospital as a response to the crisis. McHugh agreed, and commissioned Chalke to travel to India to make a series of inserts to be played into a week's special programming to raise the funds to build the hospital. Over £1m was donated: in 1996, the GM Priya Hospital, built by Oasis, opened in Dapegaon, one of the villages affected by the earthquake. It was named after the TV station and a young girl, Priya, who survived the earthquake. Priya had been buried for five days underneath rubble but was protected by her iron cot.

Chalke, who was only just beginning the work of Oasis in India, suggested that the completed hospital be given to the Emmanuel Hospital Association. The Association was already running a series of hospitals in the north of the country and Chalke believed it had the capacity and infrastructure to sustain the work that Oasis and GMTV had begun. The GM Priya hospital has subsequently grown and now specialises in AIDS and Cancer Care as well as neurological diseases and chronic illnesses.

Although Oasis has not built another hospital, it is now engaged in a variety of health care initiatives both in the UK and beyond.

In 2010 Oasis Youth Support, a youth violence intervention service, embedded into St Thomas’ Hospital Emergency Department, was set up under Chalke's leadership in partnership with senior hospital staff. OYS addresses the underlying issues surrounding the presentation of young people at the ED with violence-related injuries. It is designed to address psychosocial and environmental factors associated with the young people's attendance due to violence. The service provides a unique opportunity to engage vulnerable young people, often those who would not otherwise come to the attention of statutory services. It serves the London boroughs of Lambeth and Southwark – which have high levels of deprivation. It aims to reduce the number of young people returning to the Emergency Department as a result of violence, and to increase the ED's contribution towards a public health approach to violence in these areas.

In recent years Chalke's involvement in grassroots healthcare has naturally grown out of the wider work of community development Oasis is now doing in local communities around the UK and beyond. Following the 70th anniversary of the National Health Service (NHS) in July 2018 he was asked to deliver a speech to senior NHS staff on the way forward in the development of community health and wellbeing, where he stated his view that, "Our problem is that we have medicalised health care, focusing our thinking, energy and funding too narrowly. What we call the National Health Service would be better labelled a National Sickness Service. It’s time to think differently and invest in the other pillars on which real health and wellbeing are built. Health is 3D – it is about body, mind and spirit. The NHS cannot solve the health problems of the UK alone. It is time to think more radically." Oasis has subsequently launched Oasis Community Health as a new element of its work in partnership with Guy's and St.Thomas’ Charitable Trust and Frimley Park NHS Trust.

== Broadcaster ==
Chalke has been a regular broadcaster for over 30 years. He hosted various shows for ITV during the 1990s as well as being part of their GMTV morning breakfast show team from 1993 to 1999. He also presented BBC1's Songs of Praise during that period, as well as hosting a regular show on BBC Radio 4 about community development, Changing Places. He currently contributes across the media as a social, religious and political commentator as well as being a regular presenter of Pause for Thought on BBC Radio 2 and 'Prayer For The Day' on BBC Radio 4.

== Guinness World Record holder ==
In 2005 Chalke became the holder of the Guinness World Record for the largest amount of sponsorship money ever raised by an individual through a single event. He broke this record by raising £1.25 million for Oasis' work with schools in disadvantaged communities, through running the London Marathon. His record was beaten at the following year's marathon by Sir Steve Redgrave who raised over £1.785 million. In April 2007 Chalke recaptured the title as well as becoming the fastest money-generating sports person in history, by raising over £1.855 million in 3 hours 58 minutes 40 seconds. When he crossed the finishing line at the 2011 London Marathon, after 4 hours 31 minutes, Chalke broke this record for a third time by raising £2.32 million.

== Views and activism ==
=== Faithworks ===
In 2001 Chalke founded The Faithworks Movement, along with a companion magazine, to raise awareness of the role the Church can play within local communities. Faithworks's resources support churches of all denominations across the UK. Chalke has become a spokesman for the church in the national debate about the provision of public services by faith-based groups. Over 20,000 members—including individuals, churches and other not-for-profit organizations—count themselves as part of the Faithworks movement.

=== Stop the Traffik ===
In 2005 Chalke set up Stop the Traffik, a global coalition which works to raise awareness of human trafficking in all countries and communities and to stop the buying and selling of people.

In 2008 he was appointed Special Advisor on Community Action to the United Nations Global Initiative to Fight Human Trafficking (UN.GIFT), following the coalition's delivery of 1.5 million signatures in support of a global declaration against human trafficking at a UN conference in Vienna in February of that year. He held this position until 2015.

Initially STOP THE TRAFFIK was set up as a two-year campaign to coincide with the bicentenary of the Abolition of the Slave Trade Act 1807. The campaign intended to:

Educate: create awareness and understanding of people trafficking.
Advocate: engage with those who have the power to minimise the trafficking of people.
Fundraise: Financing anti-trafficking work around the world working with those vulnerable to and those who have been trafficked.

March 2009 saw the publication of Stop The Traffick: People should not be Bought and Sold, co-authored by Chalke and Cherie Blair, which looks worldwide at the issue and responses to it.

=== The meaning of the cross ===
In 2003 Chalke co-authored The Lost Message of Jesus with Alan Mann (Zondervan). This book provoked considerable controversy in evangelical Christian circles. The debate arose mostly because of Chalke's rejection of a theological understanding of the atonement known as penal substitution. Chalke's views drew much criticism as well as support, with numerous articles, blogs and books being written on both sides of the debate.

The continuing controversy led to the Evangelical Alliance organising a symposium in July 2005 to discuss the issue. A record of this symposium includes a chapter by Chalke, and his views are also contained in "the atonement debate". A group of three conservative evangelical theologians responded to Chalke with their book, Pierced for Our Transgressions (Crossway Publishing, 2007), which strongly criticised Chalke's position as inconsistent with some evangelical confessions of faith. However, the prominent Anglican Open Evangelical theologian and former Bishop of Durham, Tom Wright, endorsed Chalke as a leading evangelical and spoke out against the latter book, commenting, for instance, that 'despite the ringing endorsements of famous men, it [Pierced For Our Transgressions] is deeply, profoundly, and disturbingly sub-biblical'.

=== Support for social activism ===
Chalke is a prominent social activist and leading advocate of the role of Christian faith in public life and the delivery of public services including education, health care, youth services, etc. He has drawn strong criticism from leading atheists and secularists such as Polly Toynbee and Keith Porteous Wood, with whom he has publicly debated, as well as Terry Sanderson and others for his stance. "Most dangerous are the Christian global corporations such as Oasis headed up by Steve Chalke who have snatched growing numbers of academy contracts, also have ambitions to run hospitals too."

However, Chalke maintains that though Christian faith is personal, it is never private, and has written extensively about public theology (see Intelligent Church).

"There is a widespread, popular myth that unless faith is restricted to the private sphere, it will inevitably lead to intolerance and extremeism [sic]. But the reality could not be more different. Beneath the headlines of religious fanaticism and intolerance are the untold stories of countless individuals who, motivated by their personal faith, choose to work for the betterment of our society. For them, faith may be personal, but it is never private. Like the thousands of churches and other faith groups up and down the country that commit to improving the lives of society's most vulnerable – running homeless hostels, alcohol recovery programmes and youth mentoring schemes in response to the needs they see around them."

Chalke claims that; "Intolerance and extremeism [sic] are more to do with fundamentalism, than faith. Indeed, the memory of the 20th century is forever scarred by the fundamentalism and intolerance of communism, whose regimes not only left millions dead, but impoverished and excluded many more." He maintains that, "Without public faith, there would not have been a civil rights movement in the US or a Jubilee debt cancellation campaign [sic] in the UK. Both these movements were inspired and led by people of faith who decided that what they believed about God and humanity should impact on the world around them."

Chalke contends that there are two elements to healthy democracy; representative and participatory. He has suggested: "Democracy used to be focused around participation as much as representation, two ideas which together created a balance." Whilst Chalke believes that the hallmark of any healthy democracy is that it gives expression to these two types of democracy, he suggests that, "In our modern society, the democratic process has become far more passive and is now dominated by the idea of representation, where elected representatives (eg MP's) are held responsible for delivering the needs of those who voted, or who did not vote, for them. Westminster is the seat of representative democracy. Our society needs to invent new forms and practices that combine representative with participative democracy. The two can and indeed must meet. And the crucial point regarding the relationship between the two – between representative and participative democracy – is that the activity of the second guarentees [sic] the quality of the first. Representative democracy needs to be held accountable by participative democracy. /about-us]."

Chalke developed the Charities Parliament, now known as the People's Parliament, in order to establish a stronger voice for third-sector organisations in public life. It is intended to enable debate and dialogue between churches, charities, faith groups and government and aims to increase participation by these groups in public life.

The People's Parliament has received support from many parliamentarians and church leaders, including the former Bishop of Liverpool, James Jones, who endorsed it, saying: "This new initiative is based on the well established principles of Christ-centred vision, rigorous thinking, a depth of community engagement and a clear articulation of a biblical worldview, which are the foundations on which Oasis' work has been built."

=== Support for monogamous same-sex relationships ===
In early 2013, Chalke sent what The Independent said would be "shockwaves through Britain’s evangelical community", of which he is a leader, by stating, both on the Oasis Trust website and in an article in Christianity magazine, that he supports monogamous same-sex relationships and marriage.

Chalke had been reflecting on the matter for a long time and his January 2013 declaration represented what some regarded as a completely opposite position to the one he had earlier expressed when, in 2001, he wrote an article for Christianity (then known as Christianity and Renewal) entitled "What might Jesus say to Roy Clements about the Church and the Homosexual debate?" Clements had been a leader among Britain's evangelicals for many years when he suddenly revealed that he was gay, left his wife and began a relationship with a man.

After performing his first same-sex couple blessing ceremony in his church in September 2012, and now offering both a same-sex couple blessing liturgy as well as an order of service and vows for a same-sex marriage service on the Oasis website, Chalke explained that he was torn about the January 2013 declaration, writing that he was "[c]ompelled because, in my understanding, the principles of justice, reconciliation and inclusion sit at the heart of Jesus’s message. Afraid because I recognise the Bible is understood by many to teach that the practice of homosexuality, in any circumstance, is a sin or ‘less than God’s best’."

Because evangelical communities tend to place enormous importance on Biblical literalism, inerrancy and infallibility, the approximately 5,000-word extended version of Chalke's declaration provided theological and scriptural justifications for his new acceptance of committed homosexual relationships. Acknowledging that many of his fellow evangelicals would be upset by it, Chalke wrote that some would think that he strayed from scripture and was no longer an evangelical. "I have formed my view, however, not out of any disregard for the Bible's authority, but by way of grappling with it and, through prayerful reflection, seeking to take it seriously." Chalke insisted that it is only by scriptural misinterpretation that those who claim the Bible condemns all forms of homosexuality have arrived at such a position; and that this position will eventually become the minority view in the same way that those who cited Biblical justifications for slavery and a secondary role for women have also become minority views.

Chalke criticised traditional Christianity's rejection of "faithful gay relationships", saying that it has left far too many people feeling "vulnerable and isolated". He also wrote that it has done physical harm. "People’s lives are at stake", he wrote. "Numerous studies show that suicide rates among gay people, especially young people, are comparatively high. Church leaders sometimes use this data to argue that homosexuality is unhealthy when tragically it's anti-gay stigma, propped up by Church attitudes, which, all too often, drives these statistics."

"When we refuse to make room for gay people to live in loving, stable relationships", he wrote, "we consign them to lives of loneness, secrecy and fear. It's one thing to be critical of a promiscuous lifestyle, but shouldn't the Church consider nurturing positive models for permanent and monogamous homosexual relationships?"

Chalke is a member of Accepting Evangelicals which describes itself as an "open network of Evangelical Christians who believe the time has come to move towards the acceptance of faithful, loving same-sex partnerships at every level of church life, and the development of a positive Christian ethic for gay, lesbian, bisexual and transgender people."

In a 2017 interview with HuffPost Chalke explained that he believes the writings of the Apostle Paul in the New Testament are warning the early Christian Church against engaging in human relationships that are based on exploitation, abuse, and corruption. On the other hand, he claims, the New Testament has nothing to say about genuine, compassionate love between people of the same gender, as it is understood in today's world.

"Every Christian believes God to be a God of love. It is no wonder that these abusive practices are condemned by inspired scripture. But it is a disingenuous misreading of the text to conclude that what Paul describes in Romans 1 can be used to prevent people forming loving, faithful, and nurturing relationships with people of the same-sex."

He continued; "Our poor understanding of the New Testament has brought misery, persecution, oppression and rejection to countless hundreds of thousands and millions of LGBT people. It’s time to apologize for the mistakes we’ve made and move on."

=== Support for transgender people ===
Chalke has officiated at a number of services celebrating and welcoming transgender people into Oasis Church Waterloo. He and others have developed a liturgy which affirms trans people. In March 2018 Chalke published 'The Gender Agenda', a short study exploring the theology of gender identity, reassignment and confirmation.

=== Rejection of biblical inerrancy/infallibility ===
In February 2014 Chalke published a paper on the Oasis UK website entitled "Restoring Confidence in the Bible: Can we use the Bible as a reliable moral and spiritual guide in our twenty-first century globalised world?" in which he states his rejection of the evangelical teaching that the bible is inerrant or infallible.

In his paper Chalke argues, 'Throughout my life, the Bible has been a constant reference point and source of personal inspiration. Because of this, I feel deep sorrow that, on one hand, vast numbers of people around the world consider our sacred text to be, at best, confusing and, at worst, intolerant and violent. On the other, I am frustrated that our responses, as the Church, to their questions are so often ill thought through, poorly articulated and laden with in-house, inhospitable and inaccessible language...Developing a consistent and honest methodology for interpreting the Bible is a pivotal issue for the Church around the world. Only as we adopt an open, humble, discursive and transparent approach to this task will we be in a strong position to respond with integrity to the moral, social and political issues which face us as individuals, as local and national communities and as a global society as a whole.'

== Personal life ==
Chalke enjoys going to the gym and running. He married Cornelia Reeves in 1980 and they have four adult children.

== Honours ==
In the 2004 New Year Honours, Chalke was appointed a Member of the Order of the British Empire (MBE) "for services to social exclusion through the charities Oasis Trust and Parentalk".

In 2005 he was made an honorary fellow of Sarum College, Salisbury.

In 2012 Chalke was chosen as one of the Olympic torchbearers for London 2012.

In 2015 he was awarded an honorary doctorate by Staffordshire University.

In 2017 Chalke was installed as an ecumenical canon of Southwark Cathedral.

In 2018 Chalke was given the 'Spirit of London' award by the London Marathon.

== Writings ==
Chalke is the author of more than 40 books. He has also written monthly columns for Prima Baby on fatherhood and for Christianity magazine on church leadership. His writings include:

- The Complete Youth Manual, Kingsway, 1987 ISBN 0-86065-506-7
- Christmas Cracker, Kingsway, 1990, ISBN 0-86065-551-2
- Understanding Teenagers, Kingsway, 1991, ISBN 0-86065-925-9
- The Christian Youth Manual, Kingsway, 1992, ISBN 0-85476-285-X
- More Than Meets the Eye – A Plain Guide To Christianity, Hodder & Stoughton, 1995, ISBN 0-340-64190-8
- Christmas Unwrapped, Kingsway, 1995, ISBN 0-86065-881-3
- Making a Team Work, Kingsway, 1995, ISBN 0-85476-453-4
- The Truth About Suffering, Kingsway, 1996, ISBN 0-85476-634-0
- I Believe in Taking Action, Hodder & Stoughton, 1996, ISBN 0-340-66144-5
- Sex Matters, Hodder & Stoughton, 1996, ISBN 0-340-65661-1
- How to Succeed as a Parent Hodder & Stoughton, 1997, ISBN 0-340-67903-4
- How to Succeed as a Parent: 10 Survival Tips for Busy Mums and Dads, Hodder Headline Australia, 1997, ISBN 0-340-69443-2
- Managing Your Time, Kingsway, 1998, ISBN 0-85476-469-0
- (ed) Oh, God...120 Celebrities' Prayers, Lion Hudson, 1998, ISBN 0-7459-4026-9
- Managing Your Team, Kingsway, 1998, ISBN 0-85476-469-0
- Get Up and Give: 101 Little Ways to Make a Big Difference, HarperCollins, 1998, ISBN 0-00-274015-X
- The Parentalk Guide to the Toddler Years, Hodder & Stoughton, 1999, ISBN 0-340-72167-7
- The Parentalk Guide to the Childhood Years, Hodder & Stoughton, 1999, ISBN 0-340-72168-5
- The Parentalk Guide to the Teenage Years, Hodder & Stoughton, 1999, ISBN 0-340-72169-3
- New Era, New Church? The New Millennium Challenge To The Churches, Marshall Pickering, 1999, ISBN 0-00-274026-5
- He Never Said... Discover the Real Message of Jesus, Hodder & Stoughton, 2000, ISBN 0-340-75697-7
- (ed) Parent Talk: 80 Celebrities Take a Sideways Glance at Parenting, Hodder & Stoughton, 2000, ISBN 0-340-78516-0
- The Parentalk Guide to Your Child and Sex, Hodder & Stoughton, 2000, ISBN 0-340-75661-6
- The Parentalk Guide to Great Days Out, Hodder & Stoughton, 2001, ISBN 0-340-78545-4
- Faithworks: Stories of Hope, Kingsway, 2001, ISBN 1-84291-014-0
- Faithworks Unpacked, Kingsway, 2002, ISBN 1-84291-028-0
- How to Succeed as a Working Parent, Hodder & Stoughton, 2003, ISBN 0-340-86120-7
- Connect! Your Place In A Globalised World, Authentic Lifestyle, 2003, ISBN 1-85078-482-5
- 100 Proven Ways to Transform Your Community, Kingsway, 2003, ISBN 1-84291-119-8
- Faithworks: Intimacy and Involvement, Kingsway, 2003, ISBN 1-84291-118-X
- More Than Meets the Eye: A Fast-moving Look at Christianity, Hodder & Stoughton, 2003, ISBN 0-340-86172-X
- The Lost Message of Jesus, Zondervan, 2003, ISBN 0-310-24882-5
- Trust: A Radical Manifesto, Authentic Media, 2004, ISBN 1-85078-586-4
- Intelligent Church: A Journey Towards Christ-centred Community, Zondervan, 2006, ISBN 0-310-24884-1
- Change Agents: 25 Hard-Learned Lessons in the Art of Getting Things Done, Zondervan, 2007, ISBN 0-310-27549-0
- Stop The Traffick: People Shouldn't Be Bought & Sold, Lion 2009, ISBN 978-0-7459-5358-8
- Apprentice: Walking the way of Christ, Zondervan 2009, ISBN 978-0-310-29154-1
- Apprentice: Walking the way of Christ – The Participant's Guide, Zondervan 2009, ISBN 978-0-310-32234-4
- Different Eyes: The Art of Living Beautifully, Zondervan 2010, ISBN 978-0-310-32680-9
- Being Human: How to Become the Person you were Meant to Be, Hodder & Stoughton, 2015, ISBN 978-1-444-78949-2
- Radical: Exploring the Rise of Extremism and the Pathway to Peace, Oasis, 2016, ISBN 978-1-910719-17-6
- The Lost Message of Paul:Has the Church Misunderstand the Apostle Paul?, SPCK 2019, ISBN 978-0-281-07940-7
