= English Baccalaureate =

School performance indicator in England

The English Baccalaureate (EBacc) is a school performance indicator in England linked to the General Certificate of Secondary Education (GCSE) results. It measures students' attainment by calculating an average score from specified subject grades. The EBacc includes subjects which are studied in many subsequent university programmes.

In order to have an EBacc score for any student, they must take the following subjects at GCSE level:

- English Language and English Literature
- Mathematics
- Either Combined Science or three (Biology, Chemistry, Computer Science, and Physics)
- Either a Modern or an Ancient Foreign Language
- Geography or History

The EBacc concept emerged months after the 2010 general election, and has been modified and reduced in ambitions and scope but it is still in place as of 2026. Its intentions then were; to ensure all age 16 students left with a set of academic qualifications, to strengthen the position of 'core subjects' in schools and to increase social mobility.

== Etymology ==
Though the qualification contains the term baccalaureate, it is not, like the French baccalauréat or the International Baccalaureate (IB Diploma Program), a qualification for entry into universities and tertiary education institutions. To gain access to universities in the United Kingdom and around the world, students are required to study and take exams for GCSEs and GCE Advanced Level or the International Baccalaureate.

== History ==
=== 2011 proposal – Coalition government ===
The UK Government introduced a new performance indicator called the English Baccalaureate, which measures the percentage of students in a school who achieve 5+ A*–C grades (now five Grades 4 to 9 since the GCSE Reforms) in English, mathematics, two sciences, a foreign language and history or geography at GCSE level. The reason for its introduction was to combat the perceived fall in the number of students studying foreign languages and science.

=== 2015 revision ===
In their election manifesto (14 April 2015), Cameron, the British Conservative Party politician declared that under their office, the UK government would make the English Baccalaureate a compulsory qualification to be completed by every 16 year student in secondary schools in England, Wales, and Northern Ireland. By the time this was put out to consultation by Nicky Morgan in November both the 100% goal and the reasons has changed:

- For the EBacc to become the "default option" for all pupils, with schools to determine the "small minority of pupils for whom taking the whole EBacc is not appropriate." (The consultation subsequently makes clear that the Government intends that "in time, at least 90% of pupils in mainstream secondary schools should be entered for the EBacc." 26 )
- The proportion of pupils entering the EBacc will become a headline measure of mainstream secondary school performance that would be given a more prominent role in the Ofsted inspection framework. Also, the EBacc entry and attainment data for similar mainstream secondary schools will be published.

Computer Science has now been included with Physics, Chemistry and Biology as an acceptable qualification.

=== 2017 revision ===
On 19 July 2017, the Government published its response to the consultation on Implementing the English Baccalaureate.

- 75% of year 10 pupils in state-funded mainstream schools will start to study GCSEs in the EBacc combination of subjects by September 2022 with 90% of year 10 pupils studying GCSEs in the EBacc subjects by September 2025. (Sitting the GCSEs) in 2024 and 2027 respectively.

University technical colleges, studio schools and further education colleges with key stage 4 provision will not be included in these targets.

=== Reaction and discussion ===
- Subject choice: There is a conflict for the school, whether it spends its limited resources on incentivising the EBacc subjects to achieve the government target or on the subjects that are most suitable for the cohort of students. EBacc subjects reflect the subjects favoured for entry by the Russell Group Universities, at the expense of creative subjects such as Music, Art, Performance Arts, and vocational subjects such as Design and Technology. There is debate over the assumption that EBacc subjects actually do facilitate university entry.
- Teacher supply: Modern foreign language teachers are in short supply, after a government decision to make languages optional in 2005. To make the change suggested would require 2000 extra teachers to teach the extra 7000 hours in each year group.

=== Sutton Trust briefing ===
The Sutton Trust examined the effects of the proposals in 300 early adopters in 2013. The report set out the following key findings:

- the number of students attempting the full EBacc rose from 8% to 48%.
- that pupils at these schools largely benefitted from these changes. They were more likely to achieve good GCSEs in English and maths.
- those pupils were 1.7 percentage points more likely to be taking an A level or other level 3 qualification and 1.8 percentage points less likely to have dropped out of education entirely.
- Pupil premium students being more likely to do EBacc subjects benefitted most. The pupil premium gap closed a little more than in schools with similar pupil intake.
- Pupil premium students still do not have fair access to the EBacc curriculum subjects nationally, Sutton have identified nearly an 8% gap in languages take-up or 11,000 students.Also there was an 11% gap in humanities, equivalent to 15,000 students missing out. (Note: Attainment 8 shows pupils’ average achievement in the same suite of subjects as the Progress 8 measure. Progress 8 measures students’ progress across eight subjects: English; mathematics; three other English Baccalaureate (EBacc) subjects (sciences, computer science, geography, history and languages); and three further subjects, which can be from the range of EBacc subjects, or can be any other approved, high-value arts, academic, or vocational qualification.)
- Although evidence demonstrated that schools have successfully moved towards an EBacc aligned curriculum, the survey of headteachers confirmed that delivering the EBacc to 90% of students is beyond the reach of many schools given specialist teacher shortages. Moreover, these headteachers believe that it is not appropriate for many students.

== Calculating EBacc indicators ==
In a guidance note issued in August 2019, the government explains the calculations and the indicators.

=== Calculation of an individual students average point score (EBacc APS) ===
GCSEs are graded with a number 1–9, 4 and above is considered a pass. There are five academic areas (pillars):

- English: This consists of two subjects (English Language and English Literature), so take the best score of the two.
- Maths: One subject.
- Science: Three possible subjects so take the best two.
- Language: Only one is counted, so take the best score.
- Humanities: Only one is counted, so take the best score.

Added together, this gives a total maximum point score of six times nine thus 54. An average of the five pillars is taken, that is the total point score divided by 6, which is the student's 'Average point score'. As an indication in England this figure for girls in 2018 was 4.33.

=== Calculation of a school’s EBacc APS (average point score) ===
Sum the EBacc average point score for all pupils at the end of key stage 4, then divide that by the number of pupils in the group.

== Criticism and comment ==
=== EDSK report: ‘A Step Baccward’ ===
Published in 2019, this report by the think tank Education and Skills (EDSK) shows that "Percentage of GCSE pupils entered for all EBacc components" flat-lined in 2014 at under 40%, and that "Percentage of GCSE pupils who pass all the EBacc components" flat-lined in 2013 at under 25%. It then comments on the Sutton Trust findings that the measure widens the achievement gap for disadvantaged children.

It notes that the original aim was to switch children towards academic subjects and this was partially achieved and schools had switched resources. There had been a drop in exam entry in other crucial subjects and a loss of teachers. However, now schools are confused as to the purpose, particularly the claim that it will help students to get into high status universities. Parents, when polled, said they didn't need more indicators about their school but were worried about the narrowing of the curriculum and its impact on non-EBacc subjects. Additionally, almost all schools were experiencing significant problems with recruiting enough teachers of EBacc subjects, especially science and mathematics.

EDSK questioned the need for an EBacc indicator, as its function is duplicated by the Progress 8 and Attainment 8 indicator that has been in place since 2016.

== The suggested English Baccalaureate Certificate qualification ==
The "English Baccalaureate Certificate", or EBC, was a suggested exam system to replace the GCSE in England. After analysis, following professional criticism, the concept was dropped. It was never implemented.

According to the Coalition Government spokespersons, Nick Clegg and Michael Gove, the (supposed) dumbing down of GCSEs was one of the motivating factors. The Government stated that it planned for the new qualifications to be more "rigorous", with exams to be taken at the end of the two-year course, rather than bi-annually as occurs under the modular GCSE system.

There was particular concern about the treatment of creative subjects such as art, drama, music, and ICT, and also sport. Chris Keates of union NASUWT criticised the announcement as being "entirely driven by political ideology".

== Implications for Northern Ireland and Wales ==
Northern Ireland Education Minister John O'Dowd criticised the UK Government for failing to consult the devolved administrations in Northern Ireland and Wales prior to the announcement, saying that he would announce his own proposals for the qualifications in Northern Ireland in due time. Welsh Education Minister Leighton Andrews hinted that Wales might retain the current system, with Roberto De Benedictis, divisional secretary of the Tawe Afan Nedd branch of the National Union of Teachers, praising the apparent reluctance of the Welsh government to participate in the new scheme.

The announcement does not affect students in Scotland, which operates a separate system of qualifications from the rest of the United Kingdom.

== See also ==
- Progress 8 benchmark
- Welsh Baccalaureate
