= Oldham Council elections =

Local government elections in Greater Manchester, England

Oldham Metropolitan Borough Council elections are generally held three years out of every four, with a third of the council being elected each time. Oldham Metropolitan Borough Council, generally known as Oldham Council, is the local authority for the metropolitan borough of Oldham in Greater Manchester, England. Since the last boundary changes in 2023, 60 councillors have been elected from 20 wards.

== Council elections ==
- 1998 Oldham Metropolitan Borough Council election
- 1999 Oldham Metropolitan Borough Council election
- 2000 Oldham Metropolitan Borough Council election
- 2002 Oldham Metropolitan Borough Council election
- 2003 Oldham Metropolitan Borough Council election
- 2004 Oldham Metropolitan Borough Council election (whole Metropolitan Borough Council elected after boundary changes)
- 2006 Oldham Metropolitan Borough Council election
- 2007 Oldham Metropolitan Borough Council election
- 2008 Oldham Metropolitan Borough Council election
- 2010 Oldham Metropolitan Borough Council election
- 2011 Oldham Metropolitan Borough Council election
- 2012 Oldham Metropolitan Borough Council election
- 2014 Oldham Metropolitan Borough Council election
- 2015 Oldham Metropolitan Borough Council election
- 2016 Oldham Metropolitan Borough Council election
- 2018 Oldham Metropolitan Borough Council election
- 2019 Oldham Metropolitan Borough Council election
- 2021 Oldham Metropolitan Borough Council election
- 2022 Oldham Metropolitan Borough Council election
- 2023 Oldham Metropolitan Borough Council election (new ward boundaries)
- 2024 Oldham Metropolitan Borough Council election
- 2026 Oldham Metropolitan Borough Council election

== Results maps ==
2004 results map

2006 results map

2007 results map

2008 results map

2010 results map

2011 results map

2012 results map

2014 results map

2015 results map

2016 results map

2018 results map

2019 results map

2021 results map

2022 results map

2023 results map

2024 results map

2026 results map

== By-elections ==
=== 2002-2006 ===
Failsworth East by-election 20 November 2003
Party	Candidate	Votes	%	±%
Labour	Jim McMahon	2,045	68.0	+2.6
BNP	Charles Styles	539	17.9	+17.9
Conservative	Paul Martin	296	9.8	−17.0
Liberal Democrats	Keith Pendlebury	128	4.3	−3.4
Majority		1,506	50.1	
Turnout		3,008	37.1	
Labour hold		Swing		

=== 2006-2010 ===
Saddleworth West and Lees by-election 5 July 2007
Party	Candidate	Votes	%	±%
Liberal Democrats	Barbara Beeley	908	51.3	−3.7
Labour	Stephen Exton	416	23.5	+4.7
Conservative	Vincent Lord	243	13.7	−12.5
BNP	Martin Brierley	202	11.4	+11.4
Majority		492	27.8	
Turnout		1,769	22.0	
Liberal Democrats hold		Swing		

Failsworth East by-election 14 June 2012
Party	Candidate	Votes	%	±%
Labour	Norman Briggs	1,199	79.0	−5.9
UKIP	Carrol Ashton	209	13.8	+13.8
Liberal Democrats	Ron Wise	109	7.2	−7.9
Majority		990	65.3	
Turnout		1,517		
Labour hold		Swing		

=== 2010-2014 ===
Failsworth West by-election 15 November 2012
Party	Candidate	Votes	%	±%
Labour	Elaine Garry	832	54.1	−6.8
UKIP	Warren Bates	489	31.8	−1.5
Conservative	Lewis Quigg	122	7.9	+7.9
Green	Jean Betteridge	68	4.4	+4.4
Liberal Democrats	Martin Dinoff	26	1.7	−4.2
Majority		343	22.3	
Turnout		1,537		
Labour hold		Swing		

Royton South by-election 14 March 2013
Party	Candidate	Votes	%	±%
Labour	Marie Bashforth	938	63.7	−6.1
Conservative	Allan Fish	244	16.6	−7.6
Liberal Democrats	Stephen Barrow	221	15.0	+9.0
Green	Roger Pakeman	70	4.8	+4.8
Majority		694	47.1	
Turnout		1,473		
Labour hold		Swing		

Alexandra by-election 9 May 2013
Party	Candidate	Votes	%	±%
Labour	Zahid Chauhan	1,553	70.7	+24.3
UKIP	Derek Fletcher	412	18.8	+18.8
Liberal Democrats	Kevin Dawson	96	4.4	−14.4
Conservative	Neil Allsopp	80	3.6	−31.2
Green	Miranda Meadowcroft	55	2.5	+2.5
Majority		1,141	52.0	
Turnout		2,196		
Labour hold		Swing		

=== 2014-2018 ===
Failsworth East by-election 16 February 2017
Party	Candidate	Votes	%	±%
Labour	Paul Jacques	829	58.4	−7.3
Conservative	Antony Cahill	360	25.4	+1.7
UKIP	Nicholas Godleman	166	11.7	+11.7
Green	Andy Hunter-Rossall	49	3.5	−4.2
Liberal Democrats	Shaun Duffy	16	1.1	−1.8
Majority		469	33.0	
Turnout		1,420		
Labour hold		Swing		

Royton North by-election 8 June 2017
Party	Candidate	Votes	%	±%
Labour	Paul Jacques	2,504	49.6	−0.3
Conservative	Alan Fish	2,047	40.5	+23.7
Liberal Democrats	Russ Gosling	294	5.8	−0.1
Green	Lina Shaw	205	4.1	+0.4
Majority		457	9.0	
Turnout		5,050		
Labour hold		Swing		

=== 2018-2022 ===
Failsworth East by-election 29 November 2018
Party	Candidate	Votes	%	±%
Labour	Elizabeth Jacques	677	58.5	+5.3
Conservative	Antony Cahill	336	29.0	+0.5
Independent	Warren Bates	94	8.1	+8.1
UKIP	Paul Goldring	32	2.8	+2.8
Liberal Democrats	Stephen Barrow	18	1.6	+0.5
Majority		341	29.5	
Turnout		1,157		
Labour hold		Swing		

=== 2022-2026 ===
Hollinwood by-election 17 November 2022
Party	Candidate	Votes	%	±%
Labour	Hannah Roberts	718	44.8	−14.1
Conservative	Kamran Ghafoor	639	39.8	+21.5
Independent	Barbara Whitehead	152	9.5	+9.5
National Housing Party	John Lawrence	59	3.7	−6.4
Liberal Democrats	Dominic Cadman	36	2.2	−6.6
Majority		79	4.9	
Turnout		1,604		
Labour hold		Swing		

=== 2026-2030 ===
Failsworth West by-election 12 November 2026
Party	Candidate	Votes	%	±%
Reform	Chris Baddeley	642	41.5	−14.4
Labour	Pete Davis	600	38.8	+21.4
Restore	Rob Gunn	175	11.3	+11.3
Green	Kamran Ghafoor	60	3.9	−11.2
Conservative	Stephen Davenport	51	3.3	+0.7
Liberal Democrats	Lynne Thompson	19	1.2	−1.6
Majority		42	2.7	
Turnout		1,547		
Reform gain from Independent		Swing		
