= Amanda Chadderton =

Local politician in Oldham, England

Leader of Oldham Metropolitan Borough Council
- In office 25 May 2021 – 4 May 2023
- Preceded by: Arooj Shah
- Succeeded by: Arooj Shah

Member of Oldham Metropolitan Borough Council for Royton South
- In office 3 May 2012 – 4 May 2023

Personal details
- Party: Labour

Amanda Chadderton is an English Labour politician and former leader of Oldham Metropolitan Borough Council. She was leader between 2022 and 2023.

== Biography ==
Chadderton has lived in Oldham for her whole life, aside from during three years spent at university. She was first elected to the Oldham Metropolitan Borough Council in 2012, as the councillor for the Royton South ward. She became the deputy leader and cabinet member with responsibilities for neighbourhoods. In 2017, she held the responsibility for education and early years and closed a failing free school.

Chadderton was elected as council leader on 25 May 2022, becoming the town's third leader in just over a year after her predecessor Arooj Shah lost her seat in that year's election after just one year in post. Her two deputy leaders were Abdul Jabbar, who had responsibility for finance and low carbon, and Elaine Taylor, who had the responsibility for culture and leisure.

Chadderton was Oldham's first openly gay council leader. She was also Oldham's first sitting female councillor to have a baby while in office and raised awareness of the lack of parental leave being a barrier to women in local government.

At the 2023 election Chadderton was defeated by independent candidate Maggie Hurley, becoming the third deposed leader in three sequential elections. After being defeated, Chadderton claimed that this was "partly due to an unfounded conspiracy theory about child sexual exploitation" and suggestions that she was "hiding grooming gangs."

Political offices
Preceded by Arooj Shah	Leader of Oldham Metropolitan Borough Council; 2022–2023	Succeeded by Arooj Shah
