= 2019 Oldham Metropolitan Borough Council election =

2019 local election in England

Map of the results

The 2019 Oldham Metropolitan Borough Council election took place on 2 May 2019 to elect members of Oldham Metropolitan Borough Council in England. The election took place on the same day as other local elections in England.

== Overall results ==
Vote share changes compared to 2018.

2019 Oldham Metropolitan Borough Council election
Party	This election			Full council			This election		
Party	Seats	Net	Seats %	Other	Total	Total %	Votes	Votes %	+/−
Labour	15	▲1	75.0	30	45	75.0	21,717	40.59	▼15.37
Liberal Democrats	3	Steady	15.0	5	8	13.3	7,308	13.66	▼1.71
Independent	1	▼1	5.0	2	3	5.0	8,792	16.43	▲13.08
Conservative	1	Steady	5.0	3	4	6.7	6,456	12.07	▼9.96
UKIP	0	Steady	0.0	0	0	0.0	5,339	9.98	N/A
Green	0	Steady	0.0	0	0	0.0	2,081	3.89	▲0.60
Saddleworth First!	0	Steady	0.0	0	0	0.0	1,806	3.38	N/A

== Ward results ==
Councillors seeking re-election are marked with an asterisk; they were last elected in 2015 and changes are compared to that year's election.

=== Alexandra ===
Alexandra
Party	Candidate	Votes	%	±%
Labour	Jenny Harrison*	1,255	57.9	+5.9
Independent	Muhammad Imran Sarwar	417	19.2	n/a
UKIP	Carl Sinderby	263	12.1	−9.4
Liberal Democrats	Martin Dinoff	128	5.9	+1.4
Conservative	Jawaad Hussain	106	4.9	−17.0
Majority		838	38.6	+8.4
Rejected ballots				
Turnout		2,169	28.51	
Registered electors				
Labour hold		Swing	-6.65	

=== Chadderton Central ===
Chadderton Central
Party	Candidate	Votes	%	±%
Labour	Eddie Moores*	1,180	50.8	+5.8
UKIP	Marian Goodwin	435	18.7	n/a
Conservative	Mohammed Shah Jahan	325	14.0	−7.1
Green	Jess Mahoney	256	11.0	+6.3
Liberal Democrats	Barbara Ann Beeley	129	5.5	+2.8
Majority		745	32.0	
Rejected ballots				
Turnout		2,325	29.61	
Registered electors				
Labour hold		Swing	-6.45	

=== Chadderton North ===
Chadderton North
Party	Candidate	Votes	%	±%
Labour	Mohon Ali*	1,388	44.3	−0.7
Independent	Tracy Woodward	936	29.9	n/a
Conservative	Mohammed Alom	468	14.9	−10.3
Green	Chris Parr	188	6.0	+2.2
Liberal Democrats	John Hall	153	4.9	+0.9
Majority		452	14.4	−5.5
Rejected ballots				
Turnout		3,133	37.34	
Registered electors				
Labour hold		Swing	-15.3	

=== Chadderton South ===
Chadderton South
Party	Candidate	Votes	%	±%
Labour	Graham Shuttleworth*	964	47.4	+4.6
UKIP	Jack Dickenson	482	23.7	−12.2
Conservative	Robert Barnes	390	19.2	+3.6
Green	Melodey Walker	123	6.0	+2.8
Liberal Democrats	Tabirul Islam	76	3.7	+1.1
Majority		482	23.7	+16.8
Rejected ballots				
Turnout		2,035	25.74	
Registered electors				
Labour hold		Swing	+8.4	

=== Coldhurst ===
Montaz Azad was elected for Labour in 2015 but was suspended from the party. They stood as an independent; their individual change and Labour's change are based on the same 2015 result.

Coldhurst
Party	Candidate	Votes	%	±%
Labour	Ruji Sapna Surjan	2,031	43.7	−21.0
Independent	Montaz Azad*	1,700	36.6	−28.1
Liberal Democrats	Kutub Uddin	537	11.5	−8.1
Green	Jean Betteridge	229	4.9	n/a
Conservative	Md Shahid Miah	153	3.3	−2.0
Majority		331	7.1	−38.0
Rejected ballots				
Turnout		4,650	53.61	
Registered electors				
Labour hold		Swing		

=== Crompton ===
Crompton
Party	Candidate	Votes	%	±%
Liberal Democrats	Louie Hamblett	1,233	47.2	+18.5
UKIP	Colin Francis Jones	523	20.0	−1.3
Conservative	Phelyp Bennett	463	17.7	−5.1
Labour	Alex Jones-Casey	391	15.0	−9.5
Majority		710	27.2	+23.0
Rejected ballots				
Turnout		2,610	32.20	
Registered electors				
Liberal Democrats hold		Swing	+9.9	

=== Failsworth East ===
Failsworth East
Party	Candidate	Votes	%	±%
Independent	Brian Hobin	1,347	53.6	n/a
Labour	Paul Jean Jacques*	826	32.9	−21.5
Conservative	Antony Cahill	295	11.7	−5.4
Liberal Democrats	Alan Belmore	46	1.8	+0.3
Majority		521	20.7	−10.0
Rejected ballots				
Turnout		2,514	32.08	
Registered electors				
Independent gain from Labour		Swing	+37.55	

=== Failsworth West ===
Failsworth West
Party	Candidate	Votes	%	±%
Labour	Elaine Garry*	855	36.8	−9.7
Independent	Warren Bates	711	30.6	n/a
UKIP	Annette Evans	325	14.0	−16.7
Conservative	Michele Stockton	192	8.3	−8.7
Green	Andy Hunter-Rossall	191	8.2	n/a
Liberal Democrats	Richard Darlington	52	2.2	+0.2
Majority		144	6.2	−10.5
Rejected ballots				
Turnout		2,326	30.42	
Registered electors				
Labour hold		Swing	-20.15	

=== Hollinwood ===
Hollinwood
Party	Candidate	Votes	%	±%
Labour	Steve Williams*	990	56.1	+2.1
UKIP	Matthew Woods	457	25.9	−3.0
Conservative	Sajjad Hussain	123	7.0	−3.3
Liberal Democrats	Stephen Barrow	118	6.7	+3.2
Green	David Maybury	76	4.3	+1.0
Majority		533	30.2	+5.1
Rejected ballots				
Turnout		1,764	22.71	
Registered electors				
Labour hold		Swing	+2.55	

=== Medlock Vale ===
Kaiser Rehman was elected for Labour in 2015 but left the party. They stood as an independent; their individual change and Labour's change are based on the same 2015 result.

Medlock Vale
Party	Candidate	Votes	%	±%
Labour	Mohammed Alyas	1,346	44.4	−10.2
Independent	Kaiser Rehman*	992	32.7	−21.9
UKIP	Marcus Esbach	231	7.6	−17.4
Independent	Philip Howarth	186	6.1	n/a
Conservative	Neil Allsopp	128	4.2	−8.3
Green	Daniel Clayton	83	2.7	−1.9
Liberal Democrats	Rachel Pendlebury	64	2.1	−0.9
Majority		354	11.7	−17.9
Rejected ballots				
Turnout		3,030	34.67	
Registered electors				
Labour hold		Swing		

=== Royton North ===
Royton North
Party	Candidate	Votes	%	±%
Labour	Clint Phythian*	840	34.0	−11.1
Conservative	Allan Fish	674	27.2	+4.9
UKIP	Paul Goldring	573	23.2	−1.6
Green	Lina Shaw	219	8.9	+5.2
Liberal Democrats	Russell Gosling	168	6.8	+2.7
Majority		166	6.7	−13.7
Rejected ballots				
Turnout		2,474	32.31	
Registered electors				
Labour hold		Swing	-8.0	

=== Royton South ===
Royton South
Party	Candidate	Votes	%	±%
Labour	Steven Bashforth*	1,014	46.4	+0.4
UKIP	Anthony Prince	549	25.1	−0.2
Conservative	Ian Bond	289	13.2	−8.2
Green	Jim Stidworthy	189	8.7	+5.8
Liberal Democrats	Ken Berry	143	6.5	+2.4
Majority		465	21.3	+0.6
Rejected ballots				
Turnout		2,184	26.39	
Registered electors				
Labour hold		Swing	+0.3	

=== Saddleworth North ===
Saddleworth North
Party	Candidate	Votes	%	±%
Labour	George Hulme	704	23.8	+8.4
Saddleworth First!	Car Roberts	650	22.0	n/a
Conservative	Luke Lancaster	592	20.0	−0.9
Liberal Democrats	John Eccles	567	19.2	−6.9
UKIP	Chris Green	255	8.6	−7.4
Independent	Phil Sewell	188	6.4	n/a
Majority		54	1.8	−3.4
Rejected ballots				
Turnout		2,956	38.03	
Registered electors				
Labour gain from Liberal Democrats		Swing	-7.65	

=== Saddleworth South ===
Saddleworth South
Party	Candidate	Votes	%	±%
Conservative	Graham Sheldon*	1,068	31.3	−10.6
Liberal Democrats	Brian Lord	649	19.0	−6.2
Saddleworth First!	Duncan Goodman	496	14.5	n/a
Labour	Connor Green	466	13.7	−8.2
Independent	Helen Bishop	435	12.8	n/a
UKIP	Harry Moore	244	7.2	−3.8
Independent	Alec Crook	51	1.5	n/a
Majority		419	11.3	−5.5
Rejected ballots				
Turnout		3,409	37.15	
Registered electors				
Conservative hold		Swing	-2.2	

=== Saddleworth West & Lees ===
Saddleworth West & Lees
Party	Candidate	Votes	%	±%
Liberal Democrats	Sam Al-Hamdani	953	33.8	+18.2
Labour	Adrian Alexander*	670	23.8	−8.1
Saddleworth First!	"Boots" Errock	660	23.4	n/a
UKIP	Paul Taylor	280	9.9	−12.8
Conservative	Tom Lord	254	9.0	−13.6
Majority		283	10.0	+0.9
Rejected ballots				
Turnout		2,817	33.63	
Registered electors				
Liberal Democrats gain from Labour		Swing	+13.15	

=== Shaw ===
Shaw
Party	Candidate	Votes	%	±%
Liberal Democrats	Chris Gloster*	1,121	50.1	+18.8
Labour Co-op	Ken Rustidge	428	19.1	−7.4
UKIP	Rob Vance	318	14.2	−9.0
Conservative	Lisa Smirk	259	11.6	−3.9
Green	Catherine Hunter-Rossall	112	5.0	+1.5
Majority		693	31.0	+25.2
Rejected ballots				
Turnout		2,238	29.54	
Registered electors				
Liberal Democrats hold		Swing	+13.1	

=== St. James ===
St. James
Party	Candidate	Votes	%	±%
Labour	Angela Cosgrove*	634	31.9	−11.3
Liberal Democrats	Tony Martin	522	26.2	+15.6
UKIP	Colin Burrows	404	20.3	−10.1
Independent	Amoy Lindo-Crooks	219	11.0	n/a
Conservative	Atif Ali	124	6.2	−6.1
Green	Roger Pakeman	87	4.4	+1.0
Majority		112	5.6	−7.3
Rejected ballots				
Turnout		1,990	25.33	
Registered electors				
Labour hold		Swing	-13.45	

=== St. Mary's ===
St. Mary's
Party	Candidate	Votes	%	±%
Labour	Nyla Ibrahim	2,625	85.2	+25.7
Green	Miranda Meadowcroft	177	5.7	+3.3
Conservative	Sean Curley	148	4.8	−1.6
Liberal Democrats	Pat Lord	132	4.3	+0.6
Majority		2,448	79.4	+36.5
Rejected ballots				
Turnout		3,082	34.67	
Registered electors				
Labour hold		Swing	+11.2	

=== Waterhead ===
Waterhead
Party	Candidate	Votes	%	±%
Labour	Peter Dean*	1,233	62.2	+16.0
Liberal Democrats	Linda Dawson	431	21.7	+10.3
Conservative	Max Woodvine	319	16.1	+5.5
Majority		802	40.4	+23.4
Rejected ballots				
Turnout		1,983	24.62	
Registered electors				
Labour hold		Swing	+2.85	

=== Werneth ===
Werneth
Party	Candidate	Votes	%	±%
Labour	Javid Iqbal*	1,877	49.3	−31.1
Independent	Asghar Ali	1,610	42.3	n/a
Green	Irfat Ahmed Shajahan	151	4.0	+1.6
Conservative	Heath Fletcher	86	2.3	−4.0
Liberal Democrats	Keith Pendlebury	86	2.3	−2.2
Majority		267	7.0	−67.0
Rejected ballots				
Turnout		3,810	46.33	
Registered electors				
Labour hold		Swing	-36.7	
