= 2006 Oldham Metropolitan Borough Council election =

2006 local election in England

← 2004	4 May 2006	2007 →

20 of the 60 seats on Oldham Metropolitan Borough Council 31 seats needed for a majority
	First party	Second party	Third party
Party	Liberal Democrats	Labour	Conservative
Seats won	10	8	1
Seats after	27	31	1
Seat change	▲2	▼1	▼1
Popular vote	20,938	18,158	12,956
Percentage	34.0%	29.5%	21.0%
Swing	▲5.9%	▼3.2%	▲1.9%
	Fourth party
Party	Independent
Seats won	1
Seats after	1
Seat change	Steady
Popular vote	2,882
Percentage	4.7%
Swing	▼0.1%
- Map of the 2006 Oldham council election. Liberal Democrats in orange, Labour in red, Conservatives in blue and Independent in grey.
Council control before election
Labour
Council control after election
Labour

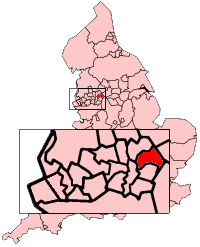
The Metropolitan Borough of Oldham shown within England.

Elections to Oldham Metropolitan Borough Council were held on 4 May 2006. One third of the Council was up for election.

The Labour Party retained overall control of the Council.

After the election, the composition of the council was:

- Labour 31
- Liberal Democrat 27
- Conservative 1
- Independent (politician) 1

== Election result ==
Oldham local election result 2006
Party	Seats	Gains	Losses	Net gain/loss	Seats %	Votes %	Votes	+/−
Liberal Democrats	10	3	1	+2	50.0	34.0	20,938	+5.9
Labour	8	1	2	-1		29.5	18,158	-3.2
Conservative	1	0	1	-1		21.0	12,956	+1.9
Green	0	0	0	0	0.0	5.8	3,563	-2.3
BNP	0	0	0	0	0.0	5.0	3,074	-0.7
Independent	1	1	1	0		4.7	2,882	-0.1

== Ward results ==
=== Alexandra ward ===
Alexandra ward
Party	Candidate	Votes	%	±%
Labour	Asaf Ali	1,061	43.9	−4.2
Liberal Democrats	Martin Dinoff	716	29.6	+4.0
Conservative	Paul Stephenson	279	11.5	+1.9
Independent	Chris Wright	193	8.0	+0.2
Green	Kay Roney	168	7.0	−1.9
Majority		345	14.3	
Turnout		2,417		
Labour hold		Swing		

=== Chadderton Central ward ===
Chadderton Central ward
Party	Candidate	Votes	%	±%
Labour	Colin McLaren	915	38.6	−12.8
Conservative	Gavin Smith	759	32.0	+32.0
Liberal Democrats	Keith Pendlebury	370	15.6	+2.5
Green	Philip Stevens	327	13.8	+1.8
Majority		345	6.6	
Turnout		2,371		
Labour gain from Independent		Swing		

=== Chadderton North ward ===
Chadderton North ward
Party	Candidate	Votes	%	±%
Conservative	Philip Rogers	1,495	48.1	+18.8
Labour	Julie Kirkham	1,127	36.3	−18.9
Liberal Democrats	Keith Taylor	311	10.0	−5.4
Green	Joan Spencer	172	5.5	+5.5
Majority		368	11.8	
Turnout		3,105		
Conservative hold		Swing		

=== Chadderton South ward ===
Chadderton South ward
Party	Candidate	Votes	%	±%
Labour	Elizabeth Wrigglesworth	1,054	44.1	−21.6
Conservative	John Berry	709	29.7	+16.2
Green	Susannah Stevens	374	15.7	+15.7
Liberal Democrats	Philip Renold	251	10.5	−10.2
Majority		345	14.4	
Turnout		2,388		
Labour hold		Swing		

=== Coldhurst ward ===
Coldhurst ward
Party	Candidate	Votes	%	±%
Liberal Democrats	Muhammad Uddin	1,984	49.7	+10.8
Conservative	Abu Choudhury	1,100	27.6	+13.8
Labour	Joseph Fitzpatrick	906	22.7	−20.6
Majority		884	22.1	
Turnout		3,990		
Liberal Democrats hold		Swing		

=== Crompton ward ===
Crompton ward
Party	Candidate	Votes	%	±%
Liberal Democrats	Philomena Dillon	1,761	54.1	+11.6
Conservative	David Dunning	845	25.9	−6.3
Labour	Ann Buscema	394	12.1	−6.4
Green	Fiona Southall	258	7.9	+7.9
Majority		916	28.2	
Turnout		3,258		
Liberal Democrats hold		Swing		

=== Failsworth East ward ===
Failsworth East ward
Party	Candidate	Votes	%	±%
Labour	Peter Dean	1,227	48.1	−23.4
Conservative	Paul Martin	806	31.6	+20.5
Green	John Parker	356	14.0	+5.8
Liberal Democrats	Lesley Schofield	161	6.3	−2.9
Majority		421	16.5	
Turnout		2,550		
Labour hold		Swing		

=== Failsworth West ward ===
Failsworth West ward
Party	Candidate	Votes	%	±%
Labour	Aileen Bell	1,165	49.4	−15.1
Green	Warren Bates	531	22.5	+15.5
Conservative	Ian Barker	493	20.9	+12.9
Liberal Democrats	Derek Clayton	171	7.2	−4.7
Majority		634	26.9	
Turnout		2,360		
Labour hold		Swing		

=== Hollinwood ward ===
Hollinwood ward
Party	Candidate	Votes	%	±%
Liberal Democrats	Stephen Barrow	1,009	40.9	+5.6
Labour	Ian Thompson	906	36.7	−9.2
Conservative	David McDonald	352	14.3	+0.5
Green	David Roney	202	8.2	+3.3
Majority		103	4.2	
Turnout		2,469		
Liberal Democrats gain from Labour		Swing		

=== Medlock Vale ward ===
Medlock Vale ward
Party	Candidate	Votes	%	±%
Labour	Jean Jones	1,053	34.5	−17.3
Liberal Democrats	Mohammed Aslam	1,037	34.0	+11.4
BNP	Martin Brierley	557	18.3	+18.3
Green	David Shaw	203	6.7	−8.7
Conservative	Muhammad Badar	200	6.6	+2.1
Majority		16	0.5	
Turnout		3,050		
Labour hold		Swing		

=== Royton North ward ===
Royton North ward
Party	Candidate	Votes	%	±%
Labour	Olwen Chadderton	1,290	38.1	−10.5
Conservative	Joseph Farquhar	853	25.2	+7.2
BNP	Anita Corbett	848	25.0	+14.9
Liberal Democrats	Susan Barratt	397	11.7	+1.8
Majority		437	12.9	
Turnout		3,388		
Labour hold		Swing		

=== Royton South ward ===
Royton South ward
Party	Candidate	Votes	%	±%
Liberal Democrats	David Shaw	1,086	33.2	+20.8
Labour	Jill Read	900	27.5	−15.5
BNP	Angela Shearer	688	21.0	+10.6
Conservative	Allan Fish	600	18.3	−6.5
Majority		186	5.7	
Turnout		3,274		
Liberal Democrats gain from Labour		Swing		

=== Saddleworth North ward ===
Saddleworth North ward
Party	Candidate	Votes	%	±%
Liberal Democrats	Alan Roughley	1,892	55.7	+12.4
Conservative	Barbara Jackson	840	24.7	−5.7
Labour	Alastair McGregor	450	13.2	−7.6
Green	Ben McCarthy	215	6.3	+0.8
Majority		1,052	30.1	
Turnout		3,397		
Liberal Democrats hold		Swing		

=== Saddleworth South ward ===
Saddleworth South ward
Party	Candidate	Votes	%	±%
Liberal Democrats	John McCann	2,034	52.7	+7.2
Conservative	John Hudson	1,300	33.7	−4.7
Labour	Edward Moores	272	7.0	−4.7
Green	David Godwin	254	6.6	+2.3
Majority		734	19.0	
Turnout		3,860		
Liberal Democrats gain from Conservative		Swing		

=== Saddleworth West and Lees ward ===
Saddleworth West and Lees ward
Party	Candidate	Votes	%	±%
Liberal Democrats	Thomas Beeley	1,364	42.5	+3.6
Conservative	George Burston	790	24.6	−2.3
Labour	Paul Fryer	685	21.3	−3.3
Independent	Robert Allsopp	129	4.0	+0.2
Majority		574	19.3	
Turnout		2,968		
Liberal Democrats hold		Swing		

=== St James ward ===
St James ward
Party	Candidate	Votes	%	±%
Liberal Democrats	Roger Hindle	956	37.1	−13.9
Labour	Adrian Alexander	603	23.4	−3.6
BNP	Michael Treacy	526	20.4	+9.6
Conservative	Terence Hopkinson	266	10.3	+5.0
Green	Paul Holmes	225	8.7	+8.7
Majority		353	13.7	
Turnout		2,576		
Liberal Democrats hold		Swing		

=== St Marys ward ===
St Marys ward
Party	Candidate	Votes	%	±%
Independent	Ali Salamat	1,715	43.8	+43.8
Liberal Democrats	Israk Miah	1,043	26.6	−17.6
Labour	Brian Ames	769	19.6	−21.8
Conservative	David Atherton	310	7.9	−6.4
Independent	Ajawat Hussain	42	1.1	+1.1
Independent	Asif Hussain	41	1.0	+1.0
Majority		672	17.1	
Turnout		3,920		
Independent gain from Liberal Democrats		Swing		

=== Shaw ward ===
Shaw ward
Party	Candidate	Votes	%	±%
Liberal Democrats	Roderick Blyth	1,166	40.9	−16.9
Independent	Anthony Bennett	529	18.6	+18.6
BNP	Alwyn Stott	455	16.0	+8.5
Labour	Dilys Fletcher	388	13.6	−0.6
Conservative	Kevin Howard	277	9.7	−10.8
Green	Tara Ashworth	36	1.3	+1.3
Majority		637	22.3	
Turnout		2,851		
Liberal Democrats hold		Swing		

=== Waterhead ward ===
Waterhead ward
Party	Candidate	Votes	%	±%
Liberal Democrats	Lynn Thompson	1,353	48.8	−4.0
Labour	Jennifer Harrison	870	31.4	−0.4
Conservative	John Caddick	317	11.4	+7.2
Independent	Stuart Allsopp	233	8.4	+5.0
Majority		483	17.4	
Turnout		2,773		
Liberal Democrats hold		Swing		

=== Werneth ward ===
Werneth ward
Party	Candidate	Votes	%	±%
Labour	Shoab Akhtar	2,123	48.6	−3.3
Liberal Democrats	Faisal Khan	1,876	43.0	+0.2
Conservative	Kenneth Heeks	365	8.4	+3.4
Majority		247	5.6	
Turnout		4,364		
Labour hold		Swing		
