= 2018 Oldham Metropolitan Borough Council election =

2018 local election in England

Map showing the results of the 2018 Oldham Metropolitan Borough Council election

The 2018 Oldham Council election took place on 3 May 2018 to elect members of Oldham Council in England. The election took place on the same day as other local elections in England. The election saw the majority Labour Party increase its number of seats by two. The Conservative Party also gained two seats, while the Liberal Democrats lost one seat. UKIP ceased to have representation on the council following this election. The election left Labour with 47 seats, the Liberal Democrats 8 and the Conservatives 4 with the remaining seat being held by an Independent.

== Results summary ==
Vote share changes compared to 2016.

2018 Oldham Metropolitan Borough Council election
Party	This election			Full council			This election		
Party	Seats	Net	Seats %	Other	Total	Total %	Votes	Votes %	+/−
Labour	18		81.8	29	47	78.3	29,876	55.96	▲6.68
Liberal Democrats	2		9.1	6	8	13.3	7,383	13.19	▲2.19
Conservative	2		9.1	2	4	6.7	11,761	22.03	▲10.03
Independent	0		0.0	1	1	1.7	1,788	3.35	▼3.32
UKIP	N/A	▼1	0.0	0	0	0.0	N/A	N/A	N/A
Green	0		0.0	0	0	0.0	1,754	3.29	▲0.28

== Ward results ==
Councillors seeking re-election are denoted with an asterisk. They were elected in 2014 and changes in vote share are compared on that basis.

=== Alexandra ===
Alexandra
Party	Candidate	Votes	%	±%
Labour	Shaid Mushtaq*	1,455	53	
Liberal Democrats	Liaqat Ali	812	30	
Conservative	Luke Lancaster	322	12	
Green	David Maybury	132	5	
Turnout				
Labour hold		Swing		

=== Chadderton Central ===
Due to a vacancy 2 candidates were elected to this ward. The candidate with the most votes received a full 4-year term and the second-placed candidate received the remaining term of the vacated seat.

Chadderton Central
Party	Candidate	Votes	%	±%
Labour	Colin McLaren*	1,650	69	
Labour	Elaine Taylor	1,499	63	
Conservative	Mohammed Shah Jahan	488	20	
Conservative	Mohammed Shahriyar M. Jahan	440	18	
Liberal Democrats	Stephen Lynch	262	11	
Green	Jess Mahoney	243	10	
Liberal Democrats	Louie Hamblett	205	9	
Turnout				
Labour hold		Swing		
Labour hold		Swing		

=== Chadderton North ===
Chadderton North
Party	Candidate	Votes	%	±%
Labour	Barbara Brownridge*	1,612	57.8	+2.3
Conservative	Mohammed Alom	900	32.2	+1.8
Green	Daniel Clayton	161	5.8	−1.9
Liberal Democrats	John Hall	118	4.2	−2.2
Turnout		2791	33.92	−2.58
Labour hold		Swing		

=== Chadderton South ===
Chadderton South
Party	Candidate	Votes	%	±%
Labour	Arooj Shah	967	47	
Conservative	Robert Barnes	623	30	
Independent	Frank Rothwell	288	14	
Green	Melodey Walker	129	6	
Liberal Democrats	Brian Lord	69	3	
Turnout				
Labour hold		Swing		

=== Coldhurst ===
Coldhurst
Party	Candidate	Votes	%	±%
Labour	Abdul Malik*	2,680	82	
Conservative	Sean Curley	265	8	
Liberal Democrats	Rachel Pendlebury	166	5	
Green	Saleh Talukdar	155	5	
Turnout				
Labour hold		Swing		

=== Crompton ===
Crompton
Party	Candidate	Votes	%	±%
Liberal Democrats	Dave Murphy*	1,359	52	
Labour	Alexander Jones-Casey	628	24	
Conservative	Tom Lord	541	21	
Independent	Ann Tindall	102	4	
Turnout				
Liberal Democrats hold		Swing		

=== Failsworth East ===
Failsworth East
Party	Candidate	Votes	%	±%
Labour	Norman Briggs*	1,072	53	
Conservative	Antony Cahill	575	29	
Independent	Dean Ludford	275	14	
Green	Chris Parr	70	3	
Liberal Democrats	Alan Belmore	23	1	
Turnout				
Labour hold		Swing		

=== Failsworth West ===
Warren Bates was elected for UKIP in 2014.

Failsworth West
Party	Candidate	Votes	%	±%
Labour	Peter Davis	1,076	52	
Independent	Warren Bates*	448	21	
Conservative	Paul Martin	386	18	
Green	Andy Hunter-Rossall	148	7	
Liberal Democrats	Lynne Thompson	29	1	
Turnout				
Labour gain from UKIP		Swing		

=== Hollinwood ===
Due to a vacancy 2 candidates were elected to this ward. The candidate with the most votes received a full 4-year term and the second-placed candidate received the remaining term of the vacated seat.

Hollinwood
Party	Candidate	Votes	%	±%
Labour	Jean Stretton*	1,198	74	
Labour	Martin Judd	1,184	73	
Conservative	John Caddick	353	22	
Conservative	Sajjad Hussain	262	16	
Liberal Democrats	Richard Darlington	122	8	
Liberal Democrats	Martin Dinoff	106	7	
Turnout				
Labour hold		Swing		
Labour hold		Swing		

=== Medlock Vale ===
Medlock Vale
Party	Candidate	Votes	%	±%
Labour	Yasmin Toor*	1,799	69	
Independent	Philip Howarth	349	13	
Conservative	Michele Stockton	283	11	
Liberal Democrats	Barbara Beeley	107	4	
Green	Jean Betteridge	88	3	
Turnout				
Labour hold		Swing		

=== Royton North ===
Royton North
Party	Candidate	Votes	%	±%
Labour	Hannah Roberts*	1,092	48	
Conservative	Allan Fish	910	40	
Liberal Democrats	Russell Gosling	173	8	
Green	Lina Shaw	109	5	
Turnout				
Labour hold		Swing		

=== Royton South ===
Royton South
Party	Candidate	Votes	%	±%
Labour	Marie Bashforth*	1,156	54	
Conservative	Lewis Quigg	774	36	
Green	Jim Stidworthy	114	5	
Liberal Democrats	Ken Berry	109	5	
Turnout				
Labour hold		Swing		

=== Saddleworth North ===
Incumbent councillor Nicola Kirkham did not stand; she was elected as an independent in 2014 before joining Labour in 2016.

Saddleworth North
Party	Candidate	Votes	%	±%
Conservative	Pam Byrne	933	35	
Liberal Democrats	John Eccles	882	33	
Labour	George Hulme	820	31	
Turnout				
Conservative gain from Independent		Swing		

=== Saddleworth South ===
Saddleworth South
Party	Candidate	Votes	%	±%
Conservative	Jamie Curley	1,215	36	
Liberal Democrats	John McCann*	1043	31	
Labour Co-op	Ian Manners	793	24	
Independent	Helen Bishop	180	5	
Green	Catherine Hunter-Rossall	103	3	
Turnout				
Conservative gain from Liberal Democrats		Swing		

=== Saddleworth West & Lees ===
Incumbent UKIP councillor Peter Klonowski did not stand.

Saddleworth West & Lees
Party	Candidate	Votes	%	±%
Labour	Valerie Leach	1,041	40	
Conservative	Andris D'Adamo	842	32	
Liberal Democrats	Sam Al-Hamdani	737	28	
Turnout				
Labour gain from UKIP		Swing		

=== Shaw ===
Shaw
Party	Candidate	Votes	%	±%
Liberal Democrats	Hazel Gloster	1,023	44	
Labour Co-op	Ken Rustidge	672	29	
Conservative	Phelyp Bennett	427	18	
Liberal	Angie Farrell	217	9	
Turnout				
Liberal Democrats hold		Swing		

=== St. James ===
St. James
Party	Candidate	Votes	%	±%
Labour	Ginny Alexander*	968	59	
Conservative	Nicola Jeffery-Sykes	381	23	
Liberal Democrats	Stephen Barrow	176	11	
Green	Roger Pakeman	115	7	
Turnout				
Labour hold		Swing		

=== St. Mary's ===
St. Mary's
Party	Candidate	Votes	%	±%
Labour	Ali Salamat*	2,253	82	
Conservative	David Atherton	220	8	
Liberal Democrats	Pat Lord	158	6	
Green	Miranda Meadowcroft	121	4	
Turnout				
Labour hold		Swing		

=== Waterhead ===
Waterhead
Party	Candidate	Votes	%	±%
Labour	Riaz Ahmad*	1,336	60	
Liberal Democrats	Linda Dawson	355	16	
Conservative	Neil Allsopp	328	15	
Independent	Carl Roberts	146	7	
Green	Andrea Chaverra Valencia	66	3	
Turnout				
Labour hold		Swing		

=== Werneth ===
Werneth
Party	Candidate	Votes	%	±%
Labour	Shoab Akhtar*	2,924	86	
Conservative	Heath Fletcher	293	9	
Liberal Democrats	Keith Pendlebury	174	5	
Turnout				
Labour hold		Swing		

== Changes after this election ==
=== Failsworth East by-election: 29 November 2018 ===
Failsworth East
Party	Candidate	Votes	%	±%
Labour	Elizabeth Ellen Jacques	677	58.5	
Conservative	Antony Cahill	336	29.0	
Independent	William Bates	94	8.1	
UKIP	Paul Goldring	32	2.8	
Liberal Democrats	Stephen Barrow	18	1.6	
Labour hold		Swing		

=== Labour party suspensions: September 2018 ===
2 councillors were suspended from the Labour party in September 2018:

- Montaz Ali Azad (Coldhurst ward)
- James Larkin (Royton North ward)
