= 2015 Oldham Metropolitan Borough Council election =

2015 local election in England

Results of the 2015 Oldham Metropolitan Borough Council election

The 2015 Oldham Metropolitan Borough Council election took place on 7 May 2015 to elect members of Oldham Metropolitan Borough Council in England. The election took place on the same day as the UK General Election. One third of the council was up for election and Labour retained control of the council.

After the election, the composition of the council was

- Labour 45
- Liberal Democrat 10
- Conservative 2
- UKIP 2
- Independent 1

== Election result ==
Oldham local election result 2015
Party	Seats	Gains	Losses	Net gain/loss	Seats %	Votes %	Votes	+/−
Labour	16	0	0	0		44.3	43,099	-1.1
UKIP	0	0	0	0		21.9	21,345	-1.8
Conservative	1	0	0	0		17.9	17,391	+5.4
Liberal Democrats	3	0	0	0		11.0	10,686	-2.0
Green	0	0	0	0		2.5	2,471	+1.7
Independent	0	0	0	0		1.3	1,283	-2.3
Respect	0	0	0	0		1.9	883	+0.9
TUSC	0	0	0	0		0.1	126	+0.0

== Ward results ==
The electoral division results listed below are based on the changes from the 2014 elections, not taking into account any mid-term by-elections or party defections.

=== Alexandra ward ===
Alexandra
Party	Candidate	Votes	%	±%
Labour	Jenny Harrison	1,899	52.0	+3.1
Conservative	Raja Iqbal	798	21.9	+21.5
UKIP	David Carter	786	21.5	−2.2
Liberal Democrats	Richard Darlington	166	4.5	−16.1
Majority		1,101	30.2	+5.1
Turnout		3,649		
Labour hold		Swing		

=== Chadderton Central ward ===
Chadderton Central
Party	Candidate	Votes	%	±%
Labour	Eddie Moores	2,256	45.0	−0.1
UKIP	Francis Arbour	1,374	27.4	−5.7
Conservative	Robert Barnes	1,056	21.1	+2.2
Green	Jessica Stott	186	3.7	+3.7
Liberal Democrats	Derek Clayton	137	2.7	−0.1
Majority		882	17.6	+5.7
Turnout		5,009	62.89	
Labour hold		Swing		

=== Chadderton North ward ===
Chadderton North
Party	Candidate	Votes	%	±%
Labour	Mohon Ali	2,396	45.0	−4.7
Conservative	Paul Martin	1,336	25.2	+4.9
UKIP	Dave Malin	1,170	22.0	−5.5
Liberal Democrats	John Hall	216	4.1	+1.5
Green	Matthew Chester	202	3.8	+3.8
Majority		1,060	19.9	−2.3
Turnout		5,320		
Labour hold		Swing		

=== Chadderton South ward ===
Chadderton South
Party	Candidate	Votes	%	±%
Labour	Graham Shuttleworth	1,940	42.8	+2.3
UKIP	Steve Connor	1,627	35.9	−4.1
Conservative	Michele Stocktom	707	15.6	+3.5
Green	Melodey Walker	146	3.2	+1.6
Liberal Democrats	Louie Hamblett	116	2.6	−3.1
Majority		313	6.9	+6.4
Turnout		4,536		
Labour hold		Swing		

=== Coldhurst ward ===
Coldhurst
Party	Candidate	Votes	%	±%
Labour	Montaz Azad	3,452	64.7	−13.1
Liberal Democrats	Nuruz Zaman	1,046	19.6	+12.3
UKIP	Jean Eddleston	552	10.4	+10.4
Conservative	Riaj Alom	282	5.3	−2.5
Majority		2,406	45.1	−24.9
Turnout		5,332		
Labour hold		Swing		

=== Crompton ward ===
Crompton
Party	Candidate	Votes	%	±%
Liberal Democrats	Julia Turner	1,515	28.7	−2.0
Labour	Chris Goodwin	1,292	24.5	+0.4
Conservative	Phelyp Bennett	1,201	22.8	+5.9
UKIP	John Berry	1,123	21.3	−4.3
Green	Bianca Lopez	148	2.8	+0.1
Majority		223	4.2	−0.9
Turnout		5,279		
Liberal Democrats hold		Swing		

=== Failsworth East ward ===
Failsworth East
Party	Candidate	Votes	%	±%
Labour	Jim McMahon	2,571	54.4	+7.3
UKIP	Graham Whitehead	1,118	23.7	−11.8
Conservative	Antony Cahill	809	17.1	+4.4
Green	Andrew Rossall	156	3.3	−0.8
Liberal Democrats	Bill Cullen	73	1.5	+0.4
Majority		1,453	30.7	+18.7
Turnout		4,727		
Labour hold		Swing		

=== Failsworth West ward ===
Failsworth West
Party	Candidate	Votes	%	±%
Labour	Elaine Garry	2,192	47.5	+8.7
UKIP	Joan Spencer	1,420	30.7	−13.3
Conservative	Adam Carney	786	17.0	+8.2
TUSC	Sam Pennington	126	2.7	+0.4
Liberal Democrats	Enid Firth	94	2.0	+0.9
Majority		772	16.8	
Turnout		4,618		
Labour hold		Swing		

=== Hollinwood ward ===
Hollinwood
Party	Candidate	Votes	%	±%
Labour	Steve Williams	2,089	54.0	+3.9
UKIP	Thomas Eddleston	1,118	28.9	−8.3
Conservative	Sameer Zulqurnain	399	10.3	+3.2
Liberal Democrats	Martin Dinoff	137	3.5	−2.1
Green	Jonaya English	126	3.3	+3.3
Majority		971	25.1	+12.2
Turnout		3,869		
Labour hold		Swing		

=== Medlock Vale ward ===
Medlock Vale
Party	Candidate	Votes	%	±%
Labour	Kaiser Rehman	2,512	54.6	+7.5
UKIP	Imran Sarwar	1,150	25.0	−1.1
Conservative	Neil Allsopp	575	12.5	−10.8
Green	Jean Betteridge	213	4.6	+4.6
Liberal Democrats	Mohammed Zakaullah	149	3.2	−0.3
Majority		1,362	52.4	+23.2
Turnout		4,599		
Labour hold		Swing		

=== Royton North ward ===
Royton North
Party	Candidate	Votes	%	±%
Labour	Tony Larkin	2,298	45.1	+2.9
UKIP	Nigel Lea	1,261	24.8	−11.2
Conservative	Lewis Quigg	1,136	22.3	+2.4
Liberal Democrats	Shaun Duffy	208	4.1	+1.2
Green	Lauren Pickering	188	3.7	+3.7
Majority		1,037	20.4	+14.2
Turnout		5,091		
Labour hold		Swing		

=== Royton South ward ===
Royton South
Party	Candidate	Votes	%	±%
Labour	Steven Bashforth	2,326	46.0	−0.8
UKIP	Derek Fletcher	1,278	25.3	−4.6
Conservative	Allan Fish	1,086	21.4	+5.2
Liberal Democrats	Denise Tindall	222	4.1	+1.0
Green	Jim Stidworthy	145	2.9	−2.1
Majority		1,048	20.7	+3.8
Turnout		5,057		
Labour hold		Swing		

=== Saddleworth North ward ===
Saddleworth North
Party	Candidate	Votes	%	±%
Liberal Democrats	Derek Heffernan	1,440	26.1	+4.8
Conservative	Sean Curley	1,155	20.9	+9.1
Independent	Lesley Brown	958	17.4	−19.1
UKIP	Harry Moore	881	16.0	−0.7
Labour	Peter Heatley	852	15.4	+1.7
Green	Catherine Hunter	232	4.2	+4.2
Majority		285	5.2	
Turnout		5,518		
Liberal Democrats hold		Swing		

=== Saddleworth South ward ===
Saddleworth South
Party	Candidate	Votes	%	±%
Conservative	Graham Sheldon	2,489	41.9	+17.8
Liberal Democrats	Alan Belmore	1,494	25.2	−3.4
Labour	Ian Manners	1,299	21.9	+6.6
UKIP	Ray Booth	654	11.0	−3.9
Majority		995	16.7	
Turnout		5,936		
Conservative hold		Swing		

=== Saddleworth West & Lees ward ===
Saddleworth West & Lees
Party	Candidate	Votes	%	±%
Labour	Adrian Alexander	1,735	31.9	+7.1
UKIP	Ian Nurse	1,237	22.7	−8.3
Conservative	Pam Byrne	1,231	22.6	+9.7
Liberal Democrats	Stephen Barrow	857	15.6	−10.7
Independent	Helen Bishop	198	3.6	+3.6
Green	Chris O'Donnell	190	3.5	−1.5
Majority		498	9.2	
Turnout		5,448		
Labour hold		Swing		

=== Shaw ward ===
Shaw
Party	Candidate	Votes	%	±%
Liberal Democrats	Chris Gloster	1,445	31.3	−11.6
Labour	Hermione Spiggott	1,225	26.5	+5.3
UKIP	Peter Brown	1,070	23.2	−4.1
Conservative	Bob Wilcock	714	15.5	+6.9
Green	Andrew Stuttard	161	3.5	+3.5
Majority		220	4.8	−10.8
Turnout		4,615		
Liberal Democrats hold		Swing		

=== St. James ward ===
St. James
Party	Candidate	Votes	%	±%
Labour	Angela Cosgrove	1,793	43.2	+5.3
UKIP	Joseph Fitzpatrick	1,260	30.4	−1.0
Conservative	Terry Hopkinson	512	12.3	+8.7
Liberal Democrats	Kevin Dawson	439	10.6	−13.1
Green	Roger Pakeman	142	3.4	+0.1
Majority		536	12.8	
Turnout		4,146		
Labour hold		Swing		

=== St. Mary's ward ===
St. Mary's
Party	Candidate	Votes	%	±%
Labour	Shadab Qumer	3,164	59.5	−22.7
Respect	Tariq Ullah	883	16.6	+16.6
UKIP	Gary Leese	608	11.4	+11.4
Conservative	David Atherton	339	6.4	+0.4
Liberal Democrats	Badrul Amin	199	3.7	−2.3
Green	Miranda Meadowcroft	126	2.4	−0.9
Majority		2,281	42.9	−33.3
Turnout		5,319		
Labour hold		Swing		

=== Waterhead ward ===
Waterhead
Party	Candidate	Votes	%	±%
Labour	Peter Dean	2,169	46.2	+3.0
UKIP	Nicholas Godleman	1,369	29.1	+1.9
Liberal Democrats	Linda Dawson	538	11.4	−13.4
Conservative	Andris d'Adamo	496	10.6	+5.9
Independent	Naveed Ahmed	127	2.7	+2.7
Majority		800	17.0	+1.0
Turnout		4,699		
Labour hold		Swing		

=== Werneth ward ===
Werneth
Party	Candidate	Votes	%	±%
Labour	Javid Iqbal	3,639	80.4	−9.9
UKIP	Muhammad Amjad	289	6.4	+6.4
Conservative	Nicola Sykes	284	6.3	+0.6
Liberal Democrats	Keith Pendlebury	205	4.5	+0.5
Green	Chris Parr	110	2.4	+2.4
Majority		3,350	74.0	−10.6
Turnout		4,527		
Labour hold		Swing		
