= Arooj Shah =

British Labour politician

Cllr Arooj Shah

Leader of Oldham Metropolitan Borough Council
- In office 8 May 2023 – 20 May 2026
- Preceded by: Amanda Chadderton
- Succeeded by: TBD
- In office 19 May 2021 – 5 May 2022
- Preceded by: Sean Fielding
- Succeeded by: Amanda Chadderton

Member of the Greater Manchester Combined Authority
- In office May 2023 – 20 May 2026
- Preceded by: Amanda Chadderton
- Succeeded by: TBD
- In office May 2021 – 5 May 2022

Member of Oldham Metropolitan Borough Council for St Mary's
- Incumbent
- Assumed office 4 May 2023
Previous posts
Member of Oldham Metropolitan Borough Council for Chadderton South
In office
3 May 2018 – 5 May 2022
In office
3 May 2012 – 5 May 2016

Personal details
- Born: September 1978 (age 48)
- Party: Labour

Arooj Shah is a British Labour politician and was the leader of Oldham Metropolitan Borough Council in Greater Manchester between May 2021 and May 2022, and again from May 2023 to May 2026. As leader she was a member of the Greater Manchester Combined Authority and was the combined authority's portfolio lead for Equalities and Communities. She was the first Muslim woman to take charge of a council in the north of England.

First elected to the council in 2012, she was the councillor for the Chadderton South ward. She was elected as leader of the council in May 2021 after her predecessor Sean Fielding lost his seat in that year's election. Shah lost her seat in 2022 after being beaten by Robert Barnes the Conservative candidate. She later re-gained a seat on the council at the 2023 election, topping the poll in the St Mary's ward. Following the election, at which incumbent leader Amanda Chadderton was defeated, Shah was elected to lead the council again. She stepped down after the 2026 local elections. In a deleted tweet former leader of the opposition and current government advisor Harriet Harman offered Shah a peerage on the next honours list.

== Arson attack ==
Less than two months after her election as leader, in the early hours of the night of the 13 July 2021, Shah's car was deliberately set alight in what Greater Manchester Police described as a "reckless, abhorrent act". The car and neighbouring property were damaged but nobody was injured as a result of the attack.

== Relationship with Dale Cregan's getaway driver ==
Shah's relationship with Mohammed Imran Ali (known locally as "Irish Imy") has been the subject of much speculation and criticism. Ali is a convicted heroin trafficker who has been in and out of prison for most of his adult life. He was convicted in 2013 for being the getaway driver for Dale Cregan, a gangster who had assassinated a gangland rival in a turf war. While on the run Cregan lured two female Greater Manchester police officers to an address in neighbouring borough Tameside, where he murdered them by gunning them down and throwing a grenade onto their bodies.

At a full council meeting in 2020, as Deputy Leader of Oldham Council, Shah addressed long-standing rumours about her relationship with Ali, explaining she had known him since she was 11 years old. Shah's relationship with Ali was subject to further criticism when he started a vigilante group to patrol the streets of Oldham in the Chadderton and Werneth areas. Whilst Shah expressed reservations about Ali's plans, she stopped short of condemning them. This prompted a backlash by residents; local community campaigner, Robert Barnes, wrote to the Chief Executive of Oldham Council, Carolyn Wilkins, asking her if she thought it was "acceptable for street patrols to be carried out by a convicted getaway driver and heroin dealer?" Barnes subsequently stood against Shah in the Chadderton South ward as the Conservative candidate at the 2022 local elections, defeating her by 96 votes, leaving Oldham Council searching for a new leader for the second year running.

Political offices
Preceded by Sean Fielding	Leader of Oldham Metropolitan Borough Council; 2021–2022	Succeeded by Amanda Chadderton
Preceded by Amanda Chadderton	Leader of Oldham Metropolitan Borough Council; 2023–	Incumbent
