= 2012 Oldham Metropolitan Borough Council election =

2012 UK local government election

← 2011	3 May 2012	2014 →

20 councillors in Oldham
	First party	Second party	Third party
Leader	Jim McMahon	Howard Sykes	N/A
Party	Labour	Liberal Democrats	Conservative
Leader's seat	Failsworth East	Shaw	N/A
Last election	52.75%	23.39%	19.24%
Seats won	33	21	5
Popular vote	54.75%	24.58%	14.78%
Swing	▲2.01%	▲1.19%	▼4.46%
Councillors	43	14	2
Councillors +/–	▲10	▼7	▼3
- Results of the 2012 Oldham Metropolitan Borough Council election

The 2012 Oldham Council election took place on 3 May 2012 to elect members of Oldham Metropolitan Borough Council in the North West of England. This was on the same day as other 2012 United Kingdom local elections.

Labour retained control of the council.

After the election, the composition of the council was:

- Labour 44
- Liberal Democrat 14
- Conservative 2

== Election result ==
Oldham local election result 2012
Party	Seats	Gains	Losses	Net gain/loss	Seats %	Votes %	Votes	+/−
Labour	15	10	0	+10		54.8	29,217	+2.1
Liberal Democrats	4	0	7	-7		24.6	13,117	+1.2
Conservative	1	1	4	-3		14.8	7,886	-4.4
Independent	0	0	0	0		2.3	1,206	-1.4
Respect	0	0	0	0		2.0	1,067	+2.0
UKIP	0	0	0	0		1.4	723	+0.9
Green	0	0	0	0		0.3	144	-0.6

== Ward results ==
=== Alexandra ward ===
Alexandra
Party	Candidate	Votes	%	±%
Labour	Dilys Fletcher MBE	1,100	46.4	−13.1
Conservative	Raja Iqbal	826	34.8	+11.4
Liberal Democrats	Martin Dinoff	447	18.8	+1.7
Majority		274	11.4	−24.6
Turnout		2,404	32.4	−4.3
Labour gain from Liberal Democrats		Swing		

==== Alexandra ward by-election 2013 ====
A by-election was held on Thursday, 9 May 2013 in the Alexandra ward of Oldham. The seat became vacant following the death of Dilys Fletcher in February. The results were as follows:

Alexandra
Party	Candidate	Votes	%	±%
Labour	Zahid Mehmood Chauhan	1,553		
UKIP	Derek Graham Fletcher	412		
Green	Miranda Meadowcroft	55		
Liberal Democrats	Kevin Dawson	96		
Conservative	Neil Allsopp	80		
Majority		1,141		
Turnout			29.31	
Labour hold		Swing		

=== Chadderton Central ward ===
Chadderton Central
Party	Candidate	Votes	%	±%
Labour	Susan Dearden	1,552	68.4	+9.0
Conservative	Robert Barnes	596	26.3	−9.4
Liberal Democrats	Pat Lord	120	5.3	+0.4
Majority		956	42.2	+18.5
Turnout		2,283	28.9	−6.0
Labour gain from Conservative		Swing		

=== Chadderton North ward ===
Chadderton North
Party	Candidate	Votes	%	±%
Labour	Fazlul Haque	1,750	59.5	+0.9
Conservative	Paul Martin	1,040	35.4	−0.3
Liberal Democrats	Lee Miah	150	5.1	−0.6
Majority		710	24.1	+1.2
Turnout		2,940	35.9	−2.3
Labour gain from Conservative		Swing		

=== Chadderton South ward ===
Chadderton South
Party	Candidate	Votes	%	±%
Labour	David Hibbert	1,481	75.4	+6.7
Conservative	Eileen Hulme	433	22.0	−5.1
Liberal Democrats	Fazal Rahim	50	2.5	−1.7
Majority		1,048	53.4	+12.7
Turnout		1,964	24.4	−5.7
Labour hold		Swing		

=== Coldhurst ward ===
Coldhurst
Party	Candidate	Votes	%	±%
Labour	Abdul Jabbar	2,742	58.6	−2.1
Liberal Democrats	Kutub Uddin	1,709	36.5	+1.9
Conservative	Harun Miah	227	4.9	+0.2
Majority		1,033	22.1	−3.7
Turnout		4,678	54.9	+2.9
Labour hold		Swing		

=== Crompton ward ===
Crompton
Party	Candidate	Votes	%	±%
Liberal Democrats	Diane Williamson	1,286	45.7	+5.5
Labour	Ken Rustidge	949	33.7	+0.2
Conservative	Christopher Henthorn	577	20.5	−5.9
Majority		337	12.0	+5.3
Turnout		2,812	33.9	−0.2
Liberal Democrats hold		Swing		

=== Failsworth East ward ===
Failsworth East
Party	Candidate	Votes	%	±%
Labour	David Dawson	1,585	84.9	+14.2
Liberal Democrats	Stephen Barrow	283	15.1	+10.5
Majority		1,302	69.7	+23.8
Turnout		1,868	24.1	−6.4
Labour gain from Conservative		Swing		

=== Failsworth West ward ===
Failsworth West
Party	Candidate	Votes	%	±%
Labour	Sean Fielding	1,323	60.9	+2.7
UKIP	Warren Bates	723	33.3	+33.3
Liberal Democrats	Ron Wise	128	5.9	−3.4
Majority		600	32.1	−0.7
Turnout		2,174	28.3	−4.5
Labour gain from Conservative		Swing		

=== Hollinwood ward ===
Hollinwood
Party	Candidate	Votes	%	±%
Labour	Brian Ames	1,266	67.4	+6.7
Liberal Democrats	Philip Holley	456	24.3	−0.2
Conservative	Jamie Curley	155	8.3	+8.3
Majority		810	43.2	+9.0
Turnout		1,877	24.9	−8.8
Labour gain from Liberal Democrats		Swing		

=== Medlock Vale ward ===
Medlock Vale
Party	Candidate	Votes	%	±%
Labour	Ateeque Ur-Rehman	1,726	64.8	+4.5
Liberal Democrats	Keith Pendlebury	443	16.6	−4.8
Independent	Phil Howarth	364	13.7	+13.7
Conservative	Sean Curley	132	5.0	−13.4
Majority		1,283	48.1	+8.6
Turnout		2,665	33.0	−2.8
Labour hold		Swing		

=== Royton North ward ===
Royton North
Party	Candidate	Votes	%	±%
Labour	Bernard Judge	1,710	71.4	+10.5
Conservative	Lewis Quigg	555	23.2	−8.0
Liberal Democrats	Phil Renold	129	5.4	−2.5
Majority		1,155	48.2	+18.5
Turnout		2,394	30.1	−7.5
Labour hold		Swing		

=== Royton South ward ===
Royton South
Party	Candidate	Votes	%	±%
Labour	Amanda Chadderton	1,566	69.8	+4.6
Conservative	Allan Fish	544	24.2	−2.0
Liberal Democrats	Keith Taylor	134	6.0	−2.7
Majority		1,011	45.1	+6.1
Turnout		2,244	27.2	−11.2
Labour gain from Liberal Democrats		Swing		

=== Saddleworth North ward ===
Saddleworth North
Party	Candidate	Votes	%	±%
Liberal Democrats	Garth Harkness	898	33.0	+2.0
Independent	Nicola Kirkham	842	31.0	+0.4
Conservative	Phil Sewell	535	19.7	−0.4
Labour	Imran Yousaf	445	16.4	−1.9
Majority		56	2.1	+1.6
Turnout		2,720	35.9	−6.8
Liberal Democrats hold		Swing		

=== Saddleworth South ward ===
Saddleworth South
Party	Candidate	Votes	%	±%
Conservative	John Hudson	1,151	40.4	−1.7
Liberal Democrats	Brian Lord	949	33.3	+4.4
Labour	Joseph Fitzpatrick	746	26.2	+7.8
Majority		202	7.1	−6.0
Turnout		2,846	36.1	−11.1
Conservative gain from Liberal Democrats		Swing		

=== Saddleworth West & Lees ward ===
Saddleworth West & Lees
Party	Candidate	Votes	%	±%
Liberal Democrats	Val Sedgwick	1,222	47.4	+9.6
Labour	Gerald Ball	1,002	38.9	−3.4
Conservative	Pam Byrne	354	13.7	−6.3
Majority		220	8.5	
Turnout		2,578	31.0	−4.8
Liberal Democrats hold		Swing		

=== Shaw ward ===
Shaw
Party	Candidate	Votes	%	±%
Liberal Democrats	Howard Sykes	1,298	53.6	+13.2
Labour	James Larkin	782	32.3	−4.5
Conservative	Phelyp Bennett	342	14.1	−8.7
Majority		516	21.3	+17.7
Turnout		2,422	31.2	−2.2
Liberal Democrats hold		Swing		

=== St. James ward ===
St. James
Party	Candidate	Votes	%	±%
Labour	Cath Ball	955	50.6	−2.4
Liberal Democrats	Jacqueline Stanton	763	40.4	+4.7
Conservative	Neil Allsopp	171	9.1	−2.2
Majority		192	10.1	−7.2
Turnout		1,899	24.8	−3.0
Labour gain from Liberal Democrats		Swing		

=== St. Mary's ward ===
St. Mary's
Party	Candidate	Votes	%	±%
Labour	Arooj Shah	2,529	58.4	−7.1
Liberal Democrats	Mohammed Masud	1,559	36.0	+7.1
Green	Miranda Meadowcroft	144	3.3	+3.3
Conservative	David Caddick	101	2.3	−3.3
Majority		970	22.4	−13.9
Turnout		4,333	51.1	−1.5
Labour gain from Liberal Democrats		Swing		

=== Waterhead ward ===
Waterhead
Party	Candidate	Votes	%	±%
Labour	Vita Price	1,379	58.5	+10.7
Liberal Democrats	Linda Dawson	977	41.5	+3.5
Majority		402	17.1	+7.3
Turnout		2,356	29.5	−0.8
Labour gain from Liberal Democrats		Swing		

=== Werneth ward ===
Werneth
Party	Candidate	Votes	%	±%
Labour	Fida Hussain	2,629	66.4	+1.7
Respect	Iqbal Bhatti	1,067	27.0	+27.0
Conservative	Michele Stockton	147	3.7	−3.1
Liberal Democrats	Kevin Dawson	116	2.9	−25.6
Majority		1,562	39.5	+3.3
Turnout		3,959	51.8	+2.4
Labour hold		Swing		
