= 2007 Oldham Metropolitan Borough Council election =

2007 local election in England

Results of the 2007 Oldham Metropolitan Borough Council election

Elections to Oldham Metropolitan Borough Council were held on 3 May 2007. One third of the Council was up for election.

The Labour Party lost overall control of the Council.

After the election, the composition of the council was

- Labour 30
- Liberal Democrat 26
- Conservative 3
- Independent (politician) 1

== Election result ==
Oldham local election result 2007
Party	Seats	Gains	Losses	Net gain/loss	Seats %	Votes %	Votes	+/−
Liberal Democrats	9	1	2	-1		36.3	20,876	+2.3
Labour	9	2	3	-1		34.6	19,863	+5.1
Conservative	2	2	0	+2		21.1	12,147	+0.1
BNP	0	0	0			2.9	1,683	-2.1
Green	0	0	0			2.4	1,367	-3.4
Independent	0	0	0			1.7	967	-3.0
UKIP	0	0	0			0.9	541	+0.9

== Ward results ==
=== Alexandra ward ===
Alexandra ward
Party	Candidate	Votes	%	±%
Labour	Glynis Shaw	906	44.1	+0.2
Liberal Democrats	Martin Dinoff	765	37.2	+7.6
Conservative	Paul Stephenson	244	11.9	+0.4
Green	Kay Roney	139	6.8	−0.2
Majority		141	6.9	−7.4
Turnout		2,054		
Labour hold		Swing		

=== Chadderton Central ward ===
Chadderton Central ward
Party	Candidate	Votes	%	±%
Conservative	Eileen Hulme	1,218	51.2	+19.2
Labour	Tony Brownridge	997	41.9	+3.3
Liberal Democrats	Mohammed Ali	164	6.9	−8.7
Majority		221	9.3	
Turnout		2,379		
Conservative gain from Labour		Swing		

=== Chadderton North ward ===
Chadderton North ward
Party	Candidate	Votes	%	±%
Conservative	Len Quinn	1,266	44.0	−4.1
Labour	Susan Dean	983	34.2	−2.1
Liberal Democrats	Nazia Raja	317	11.0	+1.0
Independent	Eric Trigg	160	5.6	+5.6
UKIP	David Short	150	5.2	+5.2
Majority		293	9.8	−2.0
Turnout		2,876		
Conservative gain from Labour		Swing		

=== Chadderton South ward ===
Chadderton South ward
Party	Candidate	Votes	%	±%
Labour	David Jones	1,080	44.4	+0.3
Conservative	John Berry	602	24.7	−5.0
BNP	Martin Brierley	483	19.8	+19.8
Liberal Democrats	Pat Lord	170	11.1	+0.6
Majority		478	20.5	+6.1
Turnout		2,335		
Labour hold		Swing		

=== Coldhurst ward ===
Coldhurst ward
Party	Candidate	Votes	%	±%
Liberal Democrats	Jilad Miah	1,753	43.2	−6.5
Labour	Mohammed Islam	1,378	33.5	+10.8
Conservative	Abu Choudhury	654	16.1	−11.5
Independent	Nuruz Zaman	220	5.4	+5.4
Independent	Giash Uddin	55	1.4	+1.4
Majority		375	9.2	−12.9
Turnout		4,060		
Liberal Democrats hold		Swing		

=== Crompton ward ===
Crompton ward
Party	Candidate	Votes	%	±%
Liberal Democrats	John Dillon	1,550	55.6	+1.5
Conservative	David Dunning	606	21.7	−4.2
Labour	Wyn Dillon	476	17.1	+5.0
Green	Fiona Southall	157	5.6	−2.3
Majority		944	33.8	+5.7
Turnout		2,789		
Liberal Democrats hold		Swing		

=== Failsworth East ward ===
Failsworth East ward
Party	Candidate	Votes	%	±%
Labour	Jim McMahon	1,476	57.9	+9.8
Conservative	Paul Martin	825	32.3	+0.7
Green	John Parker	154	6.0	−8.0
Liberal Democrats	Dorothy Shaw	96	3.8	−2.5
Majority		651	25.5	+9.0
Turnout		2,551		
Labour hold		Swing		

=== Failsworth West ward ===
Failsworth West ward
Party	Candidate	Votes	%	±%
Labour	Glenys Butterworth	881	36.2	−13.2
Conservative	Ian Barker	735	30.2	+9.3
Green	Warren Bates	691	28.4	+5.9
Liberal Democrats	Keith Taylor	124	5.1	−2.1
Majority		146	6.0	−20.9
Turnout		2,431		
Labour hold		Swing		

=== Hollinwood ward ===
Hollinwood ward
Party	Candidate	Votes	%	±%
Liberal Democrats	Keith Pendlebury	943	42.3	+1.4
Labour	Steve Williams	905	40.6	+3.9
Conservative	David McDonald	285	12.8	−1.5
Green	David Roney	94	4.2	−4.0
Majority		38	1.7	−2.5
Turnout		2,227		
Liberal Democrats gain from Labour		Swing		

=== Medlock Vale ward ===
Medlock Vale ward
Party	Candidate	Votes	%	±%
Labour	Ged Ball	1,284	58.2	+23.7
Conservative	Ken Heeks	490	22.2	+15.6
Liberal Democrats	Philip Bagley	431	19.5	−14.5
Majority		794	36.0	+35.5
Turnout		2,205		
Labour hold		Swing		

=== Royton North ward ===
Royton North ward
Party	Candidate	Votes	%	±%
Labour	Tony Larkin	1,207	40.3	+2.2
Conservative	Joseph Farquhar	905	30.2	+5.0
BNP	Anita Corbett	486	16.2	−8.8
Liberal Democrats	Philip Renold	268	9.0	−2.7
UKIP	Trevor Hilton	126	4.2	+4.2
Majority		302	10.1	−2.8
Turnout		2,992		
Labour hold		Swing		

=== Royton South ward ===
Royton South ward
Party	Candidate	Votes	%	±%
Labour	Steven Bashforth	1,079	37.1	+9.6
Liberal Democrats	Sue Barratt	968	33.3	+0.1
Conservative	Allan Fish	598	20.5	+2.2
UKIP	Chris Shyne	265	9.1	+9.1
Majority		129	4.8	
Turnout		2,910		
Labour hold		Swing		

=== Saddleworth North ward ===
Saddleworth North ward
Party	Candidate	Votes	%	±%
Liberal Democrats	Derek Heffernan	1,813	55.7	+0.0
Conservative	Barbara Jackson	794	24.4	−0.3
Labour	Ken Hulme	650	20.0	+6.8
Majority		1,019	31.3	+1.2
Turnout		3,257		
Liberal Democrats hold		Swing		

=== Saddleworth South ward ===
Saddleworth South ward
Party	Candidate	Votes	%	±%
Liberal Democrats	Christine Wheeler	2,079	55.1	+2.4
Conservative	John Hudson	1,211	32.1	−1.6
Labour	Brian Ames	265	7.0	+0.0
Independent	Christine Beaumont-Rydings	220	5.8	+5.8
Majority		868	23.0	+4.0
Turnout		3,775		
Liberal Democrats hold		Swing		

=== Saddleworth West and Lees ward ===
Saddleworth West and Lees ward
Party	Candidate	Votes	%	±%
Liberal Democrats	Brian Lord	1,571	55.0	+12.5
Conservative	Graham Sheldon	747	26.2	+1.6
Labour	Paul Hickling	537	18.8	−2.5
Majority		824	28.9	+9.6
Turnout		2,855		
Liberal Democrats hold		Swing		

=== St James ward ===
St James ward
Party	Candidate	Votes	%	±%
Liberal Democrats	James McArdle	1,014	52.5	+15.4
Labour	Adrian Alexander	636	30.0	+6.6
BNP	Craig Lawton	371	17.5	−2.9
Majority		378	18.7	+5.0
Turnout		2,021		
Liberal Democrats hold		Swing		

=== St Marys ward ===
St Marys ward
Party	Candidate	Votes	%	±%
Labour	Shadab Qumer	2,236	52.2	+32.6
Liberal Democrats	Mohammed Masud	2,044	47.8	+21.2
Majority		192	4.5	
Turnout		4,280		
Labour gain from Liberal Democrats		Swing		

=== Shaw ward ===
Shaw ward
Party	Candidate	Votes	%	±%
Liberal Democrats	Mark Alcock	1,472	55.9	+15.0
Labour	Dilys Fletcher	350	13.3	−0.3
BNP	Alwyn Stott	343	13.0	−3.0
Conservative	Kevin Howard	337	12.8	+3.1
Independent	David Bentley	131	5.0	−13.6
Majority		1,122	42.6	+20.3
Turnout		2,633		
Liberal Democrats hold		Swing		

=== Waterhead ward ===
Waterhead ward
Party	Candidate	Votes	%	±%
Liberal Democrats	Kay Knox	1,556	62.0	+13.2
Labour	Jennifer Harrison	642	25.6	−5.8
Independent	Stuart Allsopp	181	7.2	−1.2
Green	Stuart Fielding	132	5.3	−1.9
Majority		914	36.4	+19.0
Turnout		2,511		
Liberal Democrats hold		Swing		

=== Werneth ward ===
Werneth ward
Party	Candidate	Votes	%	±%
Labour	Javid Iqbal	1,895	46.2	−2.4
Liberal Democrats	Khurshid Ahmed	1,578	38.5	−4.5
Conservative	Mohammed Jahan	630	15.4	+7.0
Majority		317	7.7	+2.1
Turnout		4,103		
Labour gain from Liberal Democrats		Swing		
