= 2016 Oldham Metropolitan Borough Council election =

2016 local election in England

2016 local election results in Oldham

The 2016 Oldham Metropolitan Borough Council election took place on 5 May 2016 to elect members of Oldham Metropolitan Borough Council in England. This was on the same day as other local elections.

After the election, the composition of the council was

- Labour 46
- Liberal Democrat 9
- Conservative 2
- UKIP 1
- Independent 2

== Election result ==
Oldham local election result 2016
Party	Seats	Gains	Losses	Net gain/loss	Seats %	Votes %	Votes	+/−
Labour	15	1	1	+0	75.0%	49.3%	27,586	
UKIP	0	0	0	+0	0.0%	15.9%	8,876	
Liberal Democrats	3	0	1	-1	15.0%	13.2%	7,383	
Conservative	1	0	0	+0	5.0%	12.0%	6,719	
Independent	1	1	0	+1	5.0%	6.7%	3,732	
Green	0	0	0	+0	0.0%	3.0%	1,681	

== Ward results ==
The electoral division results are as follows:

=== Alexandra ward ===
Alexandra
Party	Candidate	Votes	%	±%
Labour	Zahid Mehmood Chauhan	1,650	63.4	
UKIP	David Carter	642	24.7	
Conservative	Terry Hopkinson	115	4.4	
Liberal Democrats	Richard Neville Darlington	94	3.6	
Independent	Matloob Hussain	65	2.5	
Green	Irfat Ahmed Shajahan	37	1.4	
Majority		1,008	38.7	
Turnout		2,603	39.56	
Labour hold		Swing		

=== Chadderton Central ward ===
Chadderton Central
Party	Candidate	Votes	%	±%
Labour	Susan Dearden	1,371	51.6	+6.6
UKIP	Francis Adrian Arbour	741	27.9	+0.5
Conservative	Robert Barnes	337	12.7	−8.4
Green	Jessica Stott	131	4.9	+1.2
Liberal Democrats	Derek Clayton	75	2.8	+0.1
Majority		630	23.7	+6.1
Turnout		2,655	33.58	−29.31
Labour hold		Swing		

=== Chadderton North ward ===
Chadderton North
Party	Candidate	Votes	%	±%
Labour	Fazlul Haque	1,665	55.5	+10.5
Conservative	Lewis Quigg	910	30.4	+5.2
Green	Adam King	232	7.7	+3.9
Liberal Democrats	John Cecil Charles Hall	191	6.4	+2.3
Majority		755	25.5	+5.3
Turnout		2,998	36.50	−28.2
Labour hold		Swing		

=== Chadderton South ward ===
Chadderton South
Party	Candidate	Votes	%	±%
Labour	Chris Goodwin	1,416	60	
UKIP	Steve Connor	783	33	
Green	Chris Parr	106	4	
Liberal Democrats	Tabirul Islam	68	3	
Majority		633		
Turnout		2,373	31.38	
Labour hold		Swing		

=== Coldhurst ward ===
Coldhurst
Party	Candidate	Votes	%	±%
Labour	Abdul Jabbar	2,832	78	
Liberal Democrats	Nuruz Zaman	295	8	
Conservative	Jamie Curley	270	7	
Green	Saleh Uddin Talukdar	222	6	
Majority		2,537		
Turnout		3,619	44.33	
Labour hold		Swing		

=== Crompton ward ===
Crompton
Party	Candidate	Votes	%	±%
Liberal Democrats	Diane Williamson	1,239	42	
UKIP	Nicholas Adam Godleman	670	23	
Labour	Bernard Judge	640	22	
Conservative	Phelyp Bennett	393	13	
Majority		569		
Turnout		2,942	36.59	
Liberal Democrats hold		Swing		

=== Failsworth East ward ===
Failsworth East
Party	Candidate	Votes	%	±%
Labour	Cherryl Anne Brock	1,410	66	
Conservative	Antony Cahill	509	24	
Green	Andy Hunter-Rossall	166	8	
Liberal Democrats	Chris Wise	62	3	
Majority		901		
Turnout		2,147	28.13	
Labour hold		Swing		

=== Failsworth West ward ===
Failsworth West
Party	Candidate	Votes	%	±%
Labour	Sean Eric Fielding	1,511	60	
UKIP	Joan Spencer	757	30	
Conservative	Paul Martin	209	8	
Liberal Democrats	Louie Michael Hamblett	40	2	
Majority		754		
Turnout		2,517	33.73	
Labour hold		Swing		

=== Hollinwood ward ===
Hollinwood
Party	Candidate	Votes	%	±%
Labour	Brian Ames	1,157	57	
UKIP	Imran Sarwar	615	30	
Conservative	Nicola Jeffery Sykes	171	8	
Liberal Democrats	Martin Alexander Dinoff	86	4	
Majority		542		
Turnout		2,029	27.68	
Labour hold		Swing		

=== Medlock Vale ward ===
Medlock Vale
Party	Candidate	Votes	%	±%
Labour	Ateeque Ur-Rehman	1,954	70	
UKIP	John Christopher Berry	522	19	
Conservative	Hasin Amin	126	5	
Green	Jean Betteridge	90	3	
Liberal Democrats	Mohammed Zakaullah	82	3	
Majority		1,432		
Turnout		2,774	34.45	
Labour hold		Swing		

=== Royton North ward ===
Royton North
Party	Candidate	Votes	%	±%
Labour	James Anthony Larkin	1,266	50	
UKIP	Ruth Keating	602	24	
Conservative	Michele Stockton	426	17	
Liberal Democrats	Russell John Thomas Gosling	149	6	
Green	Lauren Pickering	93	4	
Majority		664		
Turnout		2,536	32.96	
Labour hold		Swing		

=== Royton South ward ===
Royton South
Party	Candidate	Votes	%	±%
Labour	Amanda Clare Chadderton	1,495	63	
Conservative	Allan Robert Fish	579	24	
Green	Jim Stidworthy	207	9	
Liberal Democrats	Vipran Srivastava	95	4	
Majority		916		
Turnout		2,376	29.18	
Labour hold		Swing		

=== Saddleworth North ward ===
Saddleworth North
Party	Candidate	Votes	%	±%
Liberal Democrats	Garth Harkness	995	33	
Labour	Valerie Leach	552	19	
Conservative	Sean Raymond Curley	479	16	
Independent	Rob Knotts	444	15	
UKIP	Harry Moore	424	14	
Green	Catherine Hunter-Rossall	81	3	
Majority		443		
Turnout		2,975	39.05	
Liberal Democrats hold		Swing		

=== Saddleworth South ward ===
Saddleworth South
Party	Candidate	Votes	%	±%
Conservative	John Hudson	1,201	38	
Liberal Democrats	Alan Stuart Belmore	1,190	37	
Labour	Ian Brian Manners	785	25	
Majority		11		
Turnout		3,176	40.00	
Conservative hold		Swing		

=== Saddleworth West & Lees ward ===
Saddleworth West & Lees
Party	Candidate	Votes	%	±%
Labour	Stephen Gordon Hewitt	955	33	
UKIP	Ian Nurse	768	27	
Liberal Democrats	Stephen Barrow	705	24	
Conservative	Andris D'Adamo	460	16	
Majority		187		
Turnout		2,888	35.10	
Labour gain from Liberal Democrats		Swing		

=== Shaw ward ===
Shaw
Party	Candidate	Votes	%	±%
Liberal Democrats	Howard David Sykes	1,294	52	
Labour	Hemmy Spiggott	661	27	
UKIP	Ian James Bond	380	15	
Conservative	Pam Byrne	155	6	
Majority		633		
Turnout		2,490	33.14	
Liberal Democrats hold		Swing		

=== St. James ward ===
St. James
Party	Candidate	Votes	%	±%
Labour	Cath Ball	924	45	
UKIP	Joseph Christopher Fitzpatrick	702	34	
Liberal Democrats	Kevin Anthony Dawson	203	10	
Conservative	John David Caddick	155	8	
Green	Roger Mark Pakeman	67	3	
Majority		222		
Turnout		2,051	26.83	
Labour hold		Swing		

=== St. Mary's ward ===
St. Mary's
Party	Candidate	Votes	%	±%
Independent	Aftab Hussain	2,190	49	
Labour	Arooj Shah	1,801	40	
UKIP	Donna Elaine Goodleman	266	6	
Conservative	David Andrew Atherton	114	3	
Green	Miranda Meadowcroft	68	2	
Liberal Democrats	Angie Farrell	64	1	
Majority		389		
Turnout		4,503	52.72	
Independent gain from Labour		Swing		

=== Waterhead ward ===
Waterhead
Party	Candidate	Votes	%	±%
Labour	Vita Rose Price	1,150	42	
UKIP	Ajawat Hussain	1,004	37	
Liberal Democrats	Linda Dawson	352	13	
Conservative	Neil Allsop	172	6	
Green	Criona Franklin	67	2	
Majority		146		
Turnout		2,745	34.08	
Labour hold		Swing		

=== Werneth ward ===
Werneth
Party	Candidate	Votes	%	±%
Labour	Fida Hussain	2,391	64	
Independent	Rehman Attiq	1,033	28	
Green	Melody Walker	114	3	
Conservative	Jawaad Hussain	109	3	
Liberal Democrats	Keith Pendlebury	104	3	
Majority		1,358		
Turnout		3,751	49.69	
Labour hold		Swing		
