= 2014 Oldham Metropolitan Borough Council election =

Municipal election

Results of the 2014 Oldham Metropolitan Borough Council election

The 2014 Oldham Metropolitan Borough Council election took place on 22 May 2014 to elect members of Oldham Metropolitan Borough Council in England. This was on the same day as other local elections.

Labour retained control of the council.

After the election, the composition of the council was:

- Labour 45
- Liberal Democrat 10
- Conservative 2
- UKIP 2
- Independent 1

== Election result ==
Oldham local election result 2014
Party	Seats	Gains	Losses	Net gain/loss	Seats %	Votes %	Votes	+/−
Labour	15	2	1	+1		45.4	25,760	-9.5
UKIP	2	2	0	+2		23.7	13,457	+22.3
Liberal Democrats	3	0	4	-4		13.0	7,402	-11.6
Conservative	0	0	0	0		12.5	7,132	-2.3
Independent	1	1	0	+1		3.6	2,049	-1.3
Green	0	0	0	0		1.8	1,015	+1.5
TUSC	0	0	0	0		0.1	59	+0.1

== Ward results ==
=== Alexandra ward ===
Alexandra
Party	Candidate	Votes	%	±%
Labour	Shaid Mushtaq	1,384	48.9	+2.5
UKIP	David Carter	672	23.7	+23.7
Liberal Democrats	Mohammed Masud	582	20.6	+1.8
Conservative	Terry Hopkinson	112	4.0	−30.8
Independent	Rebecca McGladdery	81	2.9	+2.9
Majority		712	25.1	+13.7
Turnout		2,831		
Labour hold		Swing		

=== Chadderton Central ward ===
Chadderton Central
Party	Candidate	Votes	%	±%
Labour	Colin McLaren	1,287	45.1	−23.3
UKIP	Vivien Swift	946	33.1	+33.1
Conservative	Robert Barnes	540	18.9	−7.4
Liberal Democrats	Louie Hamblett	81	2.8	−2.5
Majority		341	11.9	−30.3
Turnout		2,854		
Labour hold		Swing		

=== Chadderton North ward ===
Chadderton North
Party	Candidate	Votes	%	±%
Labour	Barbara Brownridge	1,420	49.7	−9.8
UKIP	John Berry	785	27.5	+27.5
Conservative	Paul Martin	579	20.3	−15.1
Liberal Democrats	Keith Taylor	75	2.6	−2.5
Majority		635	22.2	−1.9
Turnout		2,859		
Labour hold		Swing		

=== Chadderton South ward ===
Chadderton South
Party	Candidate	Votes	%	±%
Labour	Joy Wrigglesworth	960	40.5	−34.9
UKIP	Steve Connor	948	40.0	+40.0
Conservative	Eileen Hulme	287	12.1	−9.9
Green	Melody Walker	134	5.7	+3.2
Liberal Democrats	Kevin Dawson	39	1.6	+1.6
Majority		12	0.5	−52.9
Turnout		2,368		
Labour hold		Swing		

=== Coldhurst ward ===
Coldhurst
Party	Candidate	Votes	%	±%
Labour	Abdul Malik	2,781	77.8	+19.2
Conservative	Sean Curley	279	7.8	+2.9
Liberal Democrats	Keith Pendlebury	273	7.6	−28.9
Independent	Md Miah	242	6.8	+6.8
Majority		2,502	70.0	+47.9
Turnout		3,575		
Labour hold		Swing		

=== Crompton ward ===
Crompton
Party	Candidate	Votes	%	±%
Liberal Democrats	Dave Murphy	889	30.7	−15.0
UKIP	Derek Fletcher	742	25.6	+25.6
Labour	Ken Rustidge	697	24.1	−9.6
Conservative	Phelyp Bennett	490	16.9	−3.6
Green	Catherine Hunter	77	2.7	+2.7
Majority		147	5.1	−6.9
Turnout		2,895		
Liberal Democrats hold		Swing		

=== Failsworth East ward ===
Failsworth East
Party	Candidate	Votes	%	±%
Labour	Norman Briggs	1,055	47.1	−37.8
UKIP	Joan Spencer	785	35.0	+35.0
Conservative	Adam Carney	284	12.7	+12.7
Green	Andrew Rossall	93	4.1	+4.1
Liberal Democrats	Bill Cullen	24	1.1	−14.0
Majority		270	12.0	−57.7
Turnout		2,241		
Labour hold		Swing		

=== Failsworth West ward ===
Failsworth West
Party	Candidate	Votes	%	±%
UKIP	Warren Bates	1,120	44.0	+10.7
Labour	John Battye	988	38.8	−22.1
Conservative	Steven Cox	225	8.8	+8.8
Green	Jean Betteridge	126	4.9	+4.9
TUSC	Sam Pennington	59	2.3	+2.3
Liberal Democrats	Enid Firth	29	1.1	−4.8
Majority		132	5.2	
Turnout		2,547		
UKIP gain from Labour		Swing		

=== Hollinwood ward ===
Hollinwood
Party	Candidate	Votes	%	±%
Labour	Jean Stretton	1,094	50.1	−17.3
UKIP	Thomas Eddleston	813	37.2	+37.2
Conservative	David Caddick	155	7.1	−1.2
Liberal Democrats	Martin Dinoff	122	5.6	−18.7
Majority		281	12.9	−30.3
Turnout		2,184		
Labour hold		Swing		

=== Medlock Vale ward ===
Medlock Vale
Party	Candidate	Votes	%	±%
Labour	Yasmin Toor	1,511	47.1	−17.7
UKIP	Jean Eddleston	836	26.1	+26.1
Conservative	Mohammed Zulfiqar	748	23.3	+18.3
Liberal Democrats	John Hall	113	3.5	−13.1
Majority		675	29.2	−18.9
Turnout		2,308		
Labour hold		Swing		

=== Royton North ward ===
Royton North
Party	Candidate	Votes	%	±%
Labour	Hannah Roberts	1,147	42.2	−29.2
UKIP	Kevin Allen	979	36.0	+36.0
Conservative	Lewis Quigg	542	19.9	−3.3
Liberal Democrats	Shaun Duffy	51	1.9	−3.5
Majority		168	6.2	−42.0
Turnout		2,719		
Labour hold		Swing		

=== Royton South ward ===
Royton South
Party	Candidate	Votes	%	±%
Labour	Marie Bashforth	1,205	46.8	−23.0
UKIP	Jackie Garnett	770	29.9	+29.9
Conservative	Allan Fish	417	16.2	−8.0
Green	Jim Stidworthy	103	4.0	+4.0
Liberal Democrats	Angie Farrell	80	3.1	−2.9
Majority		435	16.9	−28.2
Turnout		2,575		
Labour hold		Swing		

=== Saddleworth North ward ===
Saddleworth North
Party	Candidate	Votes	%	±%
Independent	Nicola Kirkham	1,147	36.5	+5.5
Liberal Democrats	Alan Roughley	669	21.3	−11.8
UKIP	Angela Clark	526	16.7	+16.7
Labour	Paul Fryer	430	13.7	−2.7
Conservative	Nicola Sykes	370	11.8	−7.9
Majority		478	15.2	
Turnout		3,142		
Independent gain from Liberal Democrats		Swing		

=== Saddleworth South ward ===
Saddleworth South
Party	Candidate	Votes	%	±%
Liberal Democrats	John McCann	967	28.6	−4.7
Conservative	Pam Byrne	816	24.1	−16.3
Independent	Lesley Brown	579	17.1	+17.1
Labour	Ian Manners	517	15.3	−10.9
UKIP	Chris Shyne	506	14.9	+14.9
Majority		151	4.5	
Turnout		3,385		
Liberal Democrats hold		Swing		

=== Saddleworth West & Lees ward ===
Saddleworth West & Lees
Party	Candidate	Votes	%	±%
UKIP	Peter Klonowski	917	31.0	+31.0
Liberal Democrats	Robert Allsopp	778	26.3	−21.1
Labour	Stephen Hewitt	733	24.8	−14.1
Conservative	Neil Allsopp	383	12.9	−0.8
Green	Oliver Thompson	147	5.0	+5.0
Majority		139	4.7	
Turnout		2,958		
UKIP gain from Liberal Democrats		Swing		

=== Shaw ward ===
Shaw
Party	Candidate	Votes	%	±%
Liberal Democrats	Rod Blyth	1,106	42.9	−11.0
UKIP	Peter Brown	704	27.3	+27.3
Labour	Hermione Spiggott	548	21.2	−11.1
Conservative	Judith Haughton	222	8.6	−5.5
Majority		402	15.6	−5.7
Turnout		2,580		
Liberal Democrats hold		Swing		

=== St. James ward (2) ===
St. James
Party	Candidate	Votes	%	±%
Labour	Ginny Alexander	831	20.7	
Labour	Angela Cosgrove	689	17.2	
UKIP	Joseph Fitzpatrick	654	16.3	
UKIP	Muriel Taylor	605	15.1	
Liberal Democrats	Roger Hindle	489	12.2	
Liberal Democrats	Stephen Barrow	460	11.5	
Conservative	Edna Wolstenhulme	146	3.6	
Green	Roger Pakeman	131	3.3	
Majority				
Turnout		4,005		
Labour gain from Liberal Democrats		Swing		
Labour hold		Swing		

=== St. Mary's ward ===
St. Mary's
Party	Candidate	Votes	%	±%
Labour	Ali Salamat	2,900	82.2	+23.8
Conservative	David Atherton	213	6.0	+3.7
Liberal Democrats	Sharon McGladdery	211	6.0	−30.0
Green	Miranda Meadowcroft	204	3.3	+2.5
Majority		2,687	76.2	+53.8
Turnout		3,528		
Labour hold		Swing		

=== Waterhead ward ===
Waterhead
Party	Candidate	Votes	%	±%
Labour	Riaz Ahmad	1,198	43.2	−15.3
UKIP	Nicholas Godleman	755	27.2	+27.2
Liberal Democrats	Linda Dawson	687	24.8	−16.7
Conservative	Sarah Afzaal	131	4.7	+4.7
Majority		443	16.0	−1.1
Turnout		2,771		
Labour gain from Liberal Democrats		Swing		

=== Werneth ward ===
Werneth
Party	Candidate	Votes	%	±%
Labour	Shoab Akhtar	3,074	90.3	+23.9
Conservative	Michele Stockton	193	5.7	+2.0
Liberal Democrats	Ron Wise	137	4.0	+1.1
Majority		2,881	84.6	+45.1
Turnout		3,404		
Labour hold		Swing		
