= History of schools in Scotland =

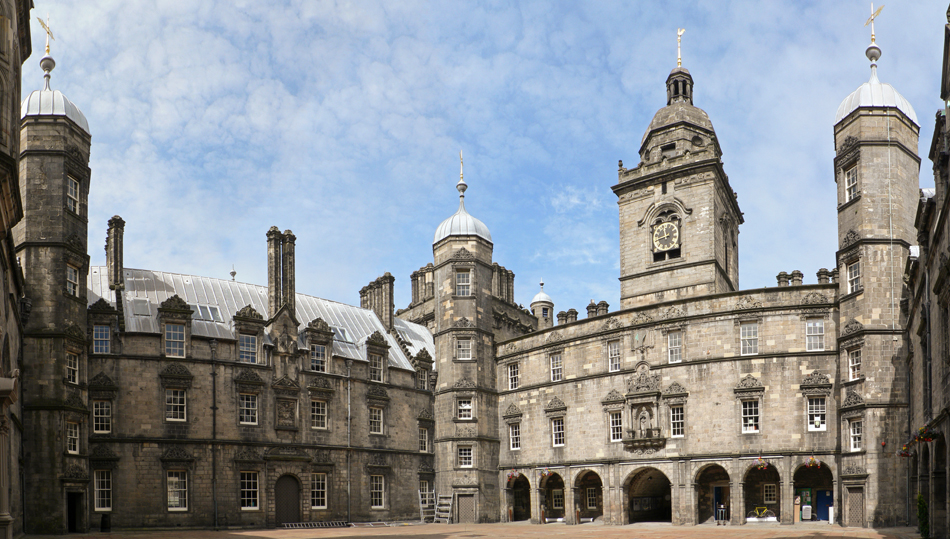
The Quadrangle of George Heriot's Hospital, Edinburgh, built in the mid-seventeenth century

The history of schools in Scotland includes the development of all schools as institutions and buildings in Scotland, from the early Middle Ages to the present day. From the early Middle Ages there were bardic schools, that trained individuals in the poetic and musical arts. Monasteries served as major repositories of knowledge and education, often running schools. In the High Middle Ages, new sources of education arose including choir and grammar schools designed to train priests. Benedictine and Augustinian foundations probably had charitable almonry schools to educate young boys, who might enter the priesthood. Some abbeys opened their doors to teach the sons of gentlemen. By the end of the Middle Ages, grammar schools could be found in all the main burghs and some small towns. In rural areas there were petty or reading schools that provided an elementary education. Private tuition in the families of lords and wealthy burghers sometimes developed into "household schools". Girls of noble families were taught in nunneries and by the end of the fifteenth century Edinburgh also had schools for girls, sometimes described as "sewing schools". There is documentary evidence for about 100 schools of these different kinds before the Reformation. The growing humanist-inspired emphasis on education cumulated with the passing of the Education Act 1496.

After the Protestant party became dominant in 1560, the First Book of Discipline set out a plan for a school in every parish, but this proved financially impossible. In the burghs the existing schools were largely maintained, with the song schools and a number of new foundations becoming reformed grammar schools or ordinary parish schools. There were also large number of unregulated private "adventure schools". Girls were only admitted to parish schools when there were insufficient numbers of boys to pay an adequate living for schoolmasters. In the lower ranks of society, girls benefited from the expansion of the parish schools system that took place after the Reformation, but were usually outnumbered by boys and often taught separately, for a shorter time and to a lower level. Acts in 1616, 1633, 1646, and 1696 obliged local landowners (heritors) to provide a schoolhouse and pay a schoolmaster, known in Scotland as a dominie, while ministers and local presbyteries oversaw the quality of the education. By the late seventeenth century there was a largely complete network of parish schools in the Lowlands, but in the Highlands basic education was still lacking in many areas.

In the eighteenth century, wealth from the Agricultural Revolution led to a programme of extensive rebuilding of schools. Many poorer girls were being taught in dame schools, informally set up by a widow or spinster to teach reading, sewing and cooking. Literacy rates were lower in the Highlands than in comparable Lowland rural society, and despite these efforts illiteracy remained prevalent into the nineteenth century. With urbanisation and population growth the kirk established 214 "assembly schools" by 1865. There were also 120 "sessional schools", mainly established by kirk sessions in towns and aimed at the children of the poor. The Disruption of 1843, which created the breakaway Free Church of Scotland, fragmented the kirk school system. By May 1847 it was claimed that 500 schools had been built, along with two teacher training colleges and a ministerial training college. The influx of large numbers of Irish immigrants in the nineteenth century led to the establishment of Catholic schools. Attempts to supplement the parish system included Sunday schools, mission schools, ragged schools, Bible societies and improvement classes. The ragged school movement attempted to provide free education to destitute children. Andrew Bell pioneered the Monitorial System, which developed into the pupil-teacher system of training. In contrast David Stow, advocated the "Glasgow method", which centred on trained adult teachers. Scottish schoolmasters gained a reputation for strictness and frequent use of the tawse.

The Education (Scotland) Act 1872 created approximately 1,000 regional School Boards, which immediately took over the schools of the old and new kirks. The emphasis on a set number of passes at exams also led to much learning by rote and the system of inspection led to even the weakest children being drilled with certain facts. The Education (Scotland) Act 1918 introduced the principle of universal free secondary education. Most of the advanced divisions of the primary schools became junior secondaries, while the old academies and Higher Grade schools became senior secondaries. Increasing numbers stayed on beyond elementary education and the leaving age was eventually raised to 16 in 1973. As a result, secondary education was the major area of growth, particularly for girls. New qualifications were developed to cope with changing aspirations. In the 1980s the curriculum was reformed to take account of the whole range of abilities. Gender differences disappeared as girls' attainment caught up with boys in the early 1980s.

== Middle Ages ==
=== Early Middle Ages ===
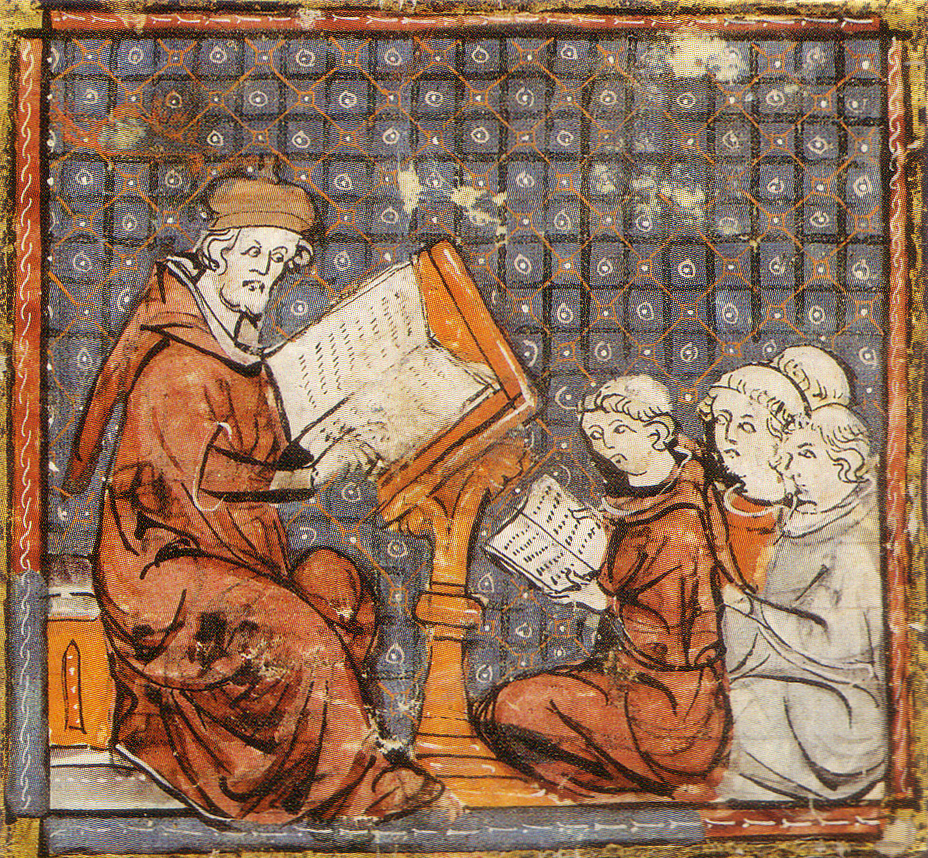
A French illustration of teaching from the late fourteenth century

From the early Middle Ages there were bardic schools, that trained individuals in the poetic and musical arts, but because Scotland was a largely oral society, little evidence of what they taught has survived. The establishment of Christianity from the sixth century brought Latin to Scotland as a scholarly and written language. In the early Middle Ages monasteries served as major repositories of knowledge and education, often running schools and providing a small, educated and overwhelmingly male, elite, who were essential to create and read documents in a largely illiterate society.

=== High Middle Ages ===
In the High Middle Ages, new sources of education arose. Choir and grammar schools were designed to train priests, with an emphasis respectively on music and Latin grammar. The reorganisation of the church that began in the reign of David I (1124–53) gave the church a clearer diocesan and parochial structure, meaning that the seats of sheriffdoms like Perth received schools that were usually under monastic patrons. Early examples of grammar schools include the High School of Glasgow in 1124 and the High School of Dundee in 1239. These were usually attached to cathedrals or a collegiate church. The newly created diocesan chancellors may have had authority over cathedral schools and schoolmasters within their diocese.

The new religious orders that became a major feature of Scottish monastic life in this period also brought new educational possibilities and the need to train larger numbers of monks. Benedictine and Augustinian foundations probably had almonry schools, charity schools using funds from the almoner to provide a type of bursary to educate young boys, who might enter the priesthood. At the Cluniac Paisley Abbey, secular chaplains were employed as schoolmasters. Some monasteries, including the Cistercian abbey at Kinloss, Sweetheart Abbey and Beauly, opened their doors to a wider range of students to teach the sons of gentlemen. St Andrews, which was both the seat of a bishop and the site of a major Augustinian foundation, had both a grammar school, under the archdeacon, and a song school, under the priory.

=== Late Middle Ages ===
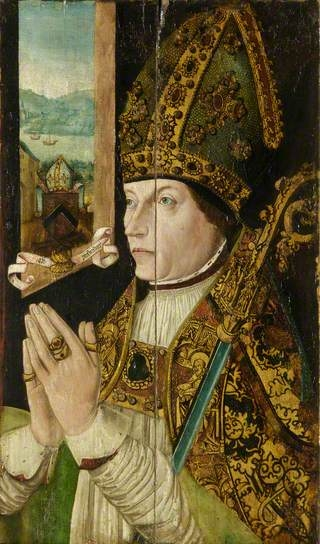
William Elphinstone, Bishop of Aberdeen, probably the architect of the Education Act 1496

The number and size of song and grammar schools seems to have expanded rapidly from the 1380s. The foundation of over 100 collegiate churches of secular priests between 1450 and the Reformation would have necessitated the training of large numbers of choristers. Sometimes, as at Lochwinnoch, they were taught both music and grammar. Dominican friars were noted for their educational achievements and were usually located in urban centres, probably teaching grammar, as at Glasgow and Ayr. By the end of the Middle Ages, grammar schools could be found in all the main burghs and some small towns.

Educational provision was probably much weaker in rural areas, but there were petty or reading schools in rural areas that provided an elementary education. There was also the development of private tuition in the families of lords and wealthy burghers. Sometimes these developed into "household schools", that may also have catered to farming neighbours and kin, as well as the sons of the laird's household, which is known to have happened at Huntly. All these schools were almost exclusively aimed at boys. Girls of noble families were taught in nunneries such as Elcho, Aberdour and Haddington. By the end of the fifteenth century Edinburgh also had schools for girls, sometimes described as "sewing schools", whose name probably indicates one of their major functions, although reading may also have been taught in these schools. The students were probably taught by a combination of lay women and nuns.

There is documentary evidence for about 100 schools of these different kinds before the Reformation. Most of the schoolmasters of these schools were clergy, and also chaplains of religious foundations, hospitals or private chaplains of noblemen, which they probably undertook in order to supplement merge incomes. To some extent, all education was controlled by different branches of the church, but towards the end of the period there was an increasing lay interest. This sometimes resulted in conflict, as between the burgh of Aberdeen and the cathedral chancellor, when the former appointed a lay graduate as schoolmaster in 1538, and when a married man was appointed to the similar post in Perth. Education began to widen beyond the training of the clergy, particularly as lay lawyers began to emerge as a profession, with a humanist emphasis on educating the future ruling class for their duties. The growing humanist-inspired emphasis on education cumulated with the passing of the Education Act 1496, thought to have been steered through parliament by the Keeper of the Privy Seal William Elphinstone, Bishop of Aberdeen, which decreed that all sons of barons and freeholders of substance should attend grammar schools to learn "perfyct Latyne". All this resulted in an increase in literacy, which was largely concentrated among a male and wealthy elite, with perhaps 60 per cent of the male nobility being literate by the end of the period.

== Early modern era ==
=== Sixteenth century ===
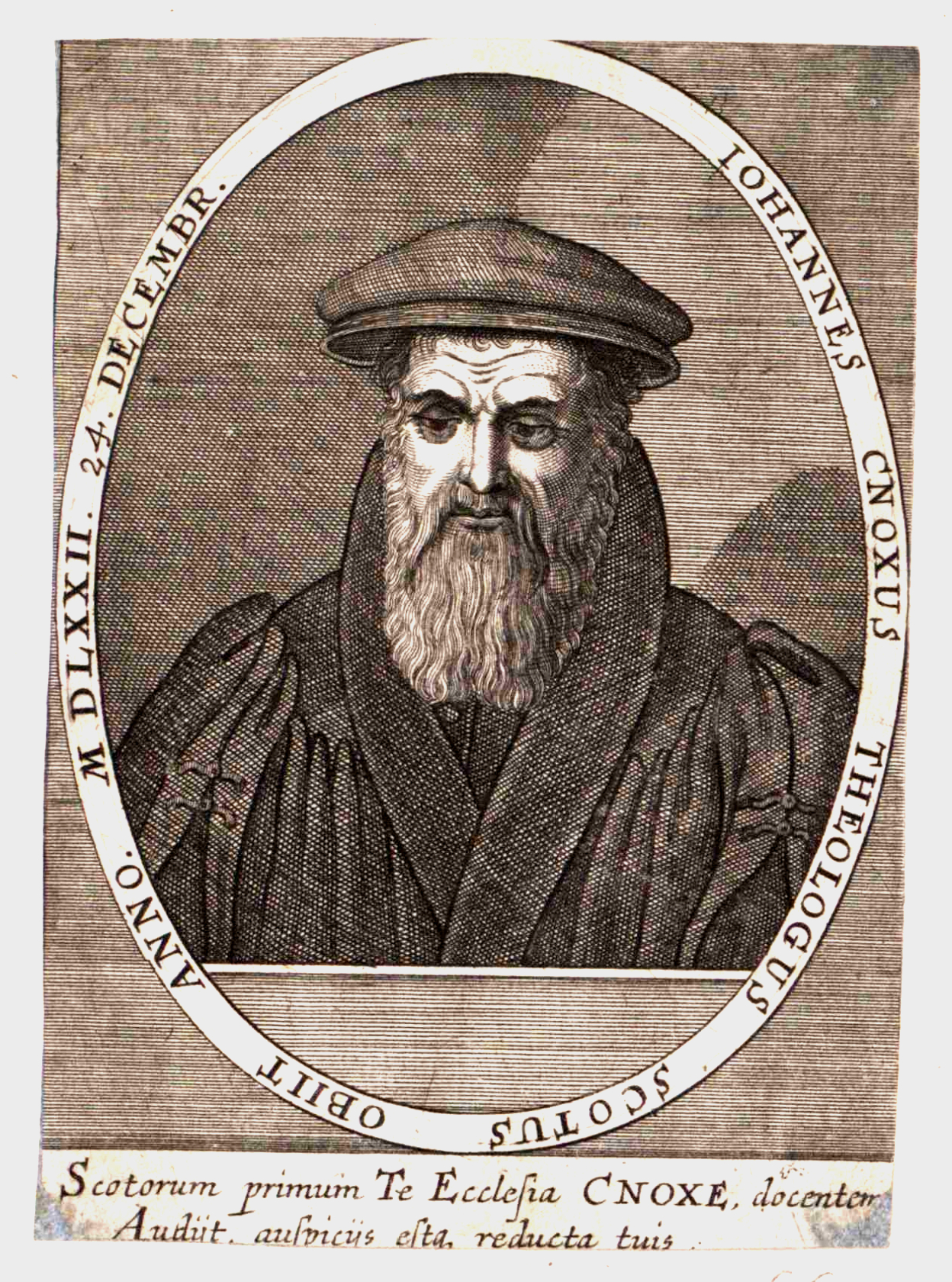
John Knox, the main architect of the First Book of Discipline, which set out a plan for a school in every parish

The humanist concern with increasing public access to education was shared by the Protestant reformers, who saw schools as vehicles for the provision of moral and religious education for a more godly society. After the Protestant party became dominant in 1560, the First Book of Discipline set out a plan for a school in every parish, but this proved financially impossible. In the burghs the existing schools were largely maintained, with the song schools and a number of new foundations becoming reformed grammar schools or ordinary parish schools. Schools were supported by a combination of kirk funds, contributions from local heritors or burgh councils and parents that could pay. They were inspected by kirk sessions of local elders, which checked for the quality of teaching and doctrinal purity. There were also large number of unregulated private "adventure schools". These were often informally created by parents in agreement with unlicensed schoolmasters, using available buildings and are chiefly evident in the historical record through complaints and attempts to suppress them by kirk sessions because they took pupils away from the official parish schools. However, such private schools were often necessary given the large populations and scale of some parishes. They were often tacitly accepted by the church and local authorities and may have been particularly important to girls and the children of the poor. Outside of the established burgh schools, which were generally better funded and more able to pay schoolmasters, masters often combined their position with other employment, particularly minor posts within the kirk, such as clerk. Immediately after the Reformation they were in short supply, but there is evidence that the expansion of the university system provided large numbers of graduates by the seventeenth century. There is evidence of about 800 schools for the period between 1560 and 1633. The parish schools were "Inglis" schools, teaching in the vernacular and taking children to the age of about 7, while the grammar schools took boys to about 12. At their best in the grammar schools, the curriculum included the catechism, Latin, French, Classical literature and sports.

The widespread belief in the limited intellectual and moral capacity of women came into conflict with a desire, intensified after the Reformation, for women to take greater personal moral responsibility, particularly as wives and mothers. In Protestantism this necessitated an ability to learn and understand the catechism and even to be able to independently read the Bible, but most commentators of the period, even those that tended to encourage the education of girls, thought they should not receive the same academic education as boys. Girls were only admitted to parish schools when there were insufficient numbers of boys to pay an adequate living for schoolmasters. In the lower ranks of society, girls benefited from the expansion of the parish schools system that took place after the Reformation, but were usually outnumbered by boys and often taught separately, for a shorter time and to a lower level. Girls were frequently taught reading, sewing and knitting, but not writing. Among the nobility there were many educated and cultured women, such as Mary, Queen of Scots.

=== Seventeenth century ===
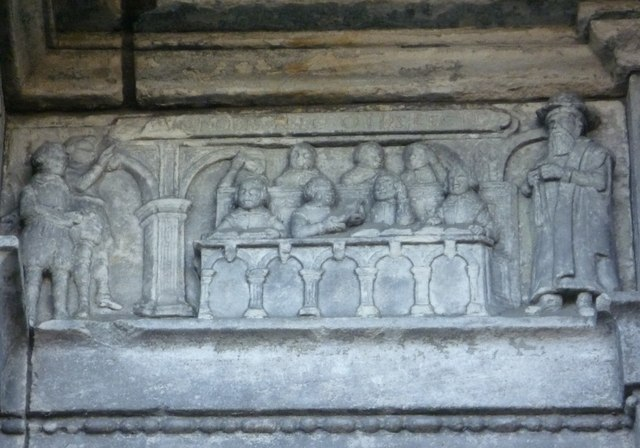
A carving of a seventeenth-century classroom with a dominie and his ten scholars, from George Heriot's School, Edinburgh

In 1616 an act in Privy council commanded every parish to establish a school "where convenient means may be had". After the Parliament of Scotland ratified this law and the Education Act 1633, a tax on local landowners was introduced to provide the necessary endowment. From 1638 Scotland underwent a "second Reformation", with widespread support for a National Covenant, objecting to the Charles I's liturgical innovations and reaffirming the Calvinism and Presbyterianism of the kirk. After the Bishop's Wars (1639–40), Scotland had virtual independence from the government in Westminster. Education remained fundamental to the ideas of the Covenanters. A loophole which allowed evasion of the education tax was closed in the Education Act 1646, which established a solid institutional foundation for schools on Covenanter principles, emphasising the role of presbyteries in supervision. Although the Restoration of the monarchy in 1660 brought a reversal to the 1633 position, in 1696 new legislation restored the provisions of 1646 together with means of enforcement "more suitable to the age" and underlined the aim of having a school in every parish. In rural communities these acts obliged local landowners (heritors) to provide a schoolhouse and pay a schoolmaster, known in Scotland as a dominie, while ministers and local presbyteries oversaw the quality of the education. In many Scottish towns, burgh schools were operated by local councils. Some wealthy individuals established "hospitals", boarding schools for deserving pupils, such as George Heriot's Hospital, Edinburgh, which was founded in 1628 and whose impressive building was opened in 1656 for 180 boys. By the late seventeenth century there was a largely complete network of parish schools in the Lowlands, but in the Highlands basic education was still lacking in many areas.

== Eighteenth century ==
=== School building ===
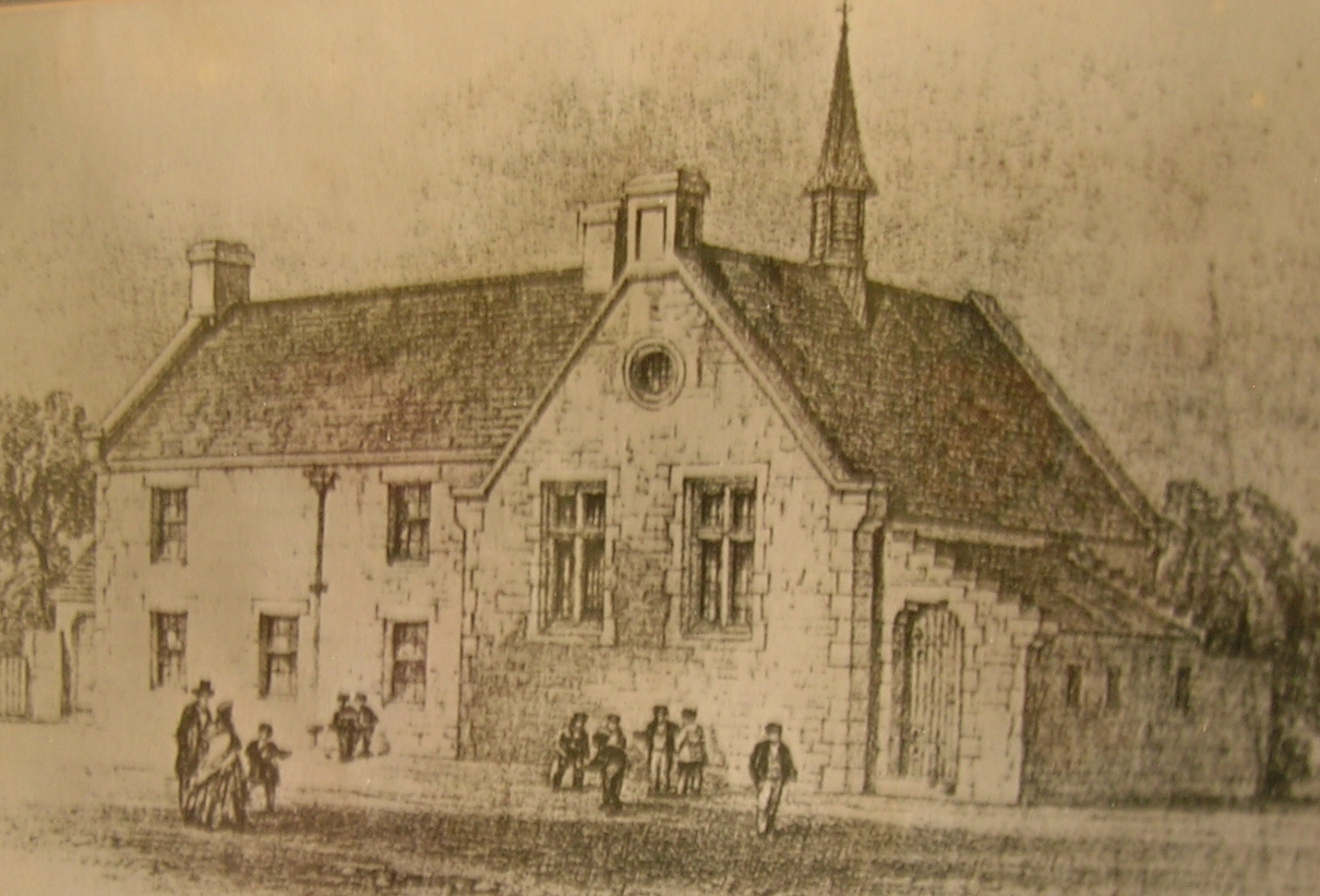
The old school at Kingsford, East Ayrshire

Hospitals continued to be built by benefactors and some of these had very impressive buildings, like that of Robert Gordon's Hospital in Aberdeen, which was designed by William Adam (1689–1748) in the 1730s. Until the late eighteenth century most schools buildings were indistinguishable from houses, but the wealth from the Agricultural Revolution led to a programme of extensive rebuilding. Most schools had a single schoolroom, which could hold up to 80 pupils, were taught by a single schoolmaster. There might be smaller adjoining rooms for the teaching of infants and girls. There was sometimes with a schoolmaster's house in the same style nearby. Many burgh schools moved away from this model of teaching from the late eighteenth century as the new commercial and vocational subjects led to the employment of more teachers. From the 1790s urban schools were often rebuild in a more imposing classical style, from public subscription, or a legacy, and renamed academies.

=== Democratic myth ===
One of the effects of the extensive network of parish schools was the growth of the "democratic myth", which in the nineteenth century created the widespread belief that many a "lad of pairts" had been able to rise up through the system to take high office and that literacy was much more widespread in Scotland than in neighbouring states, particularly England. Historians now accept that very few boys were able to pursue this route to social advancement and that literacy was not noticeably higher than in comparable nations, as the education in the parish schools was basic and short and attendance was not compulsory.

=== Girls ===
By the eighteenth century many poorer girls were being taught in dame schools, informally set up by a widow or spinster to teach reading, sewing and cooking. Among members of the aristocracy by the early eighteenth century a girl's education was expected to include basic literacy and numeracy, needlework, cookery and household management, while polite accomplishments and piety were also emphasised. Female illiteracy rates based on signatures among female servants were around 90 per cent from the late seventeenth to the early eighteenth centuries, and perhaps 85 per cent for women of all ranks by 1750, compared with 35 per cent for men. Overall literacy rates were slightly higher than in England as a whole, but female rates were much lower than for their English counterparts.

=== Highlands ===
In the Scottish Highlands, popular education was challenged by problems of distance and physical isolation, as well as teachers' and ministers' limited knowledge of Scottish Gaelic, the primary local language. Here the Kirk's parish schools were supplemented by those established from 1709 by the Society in Scotland for Propagating Christian Knowledge (SSPCK). Its aim in the Highlands was to teach English language and end the attachment to Roman Catholicism associated with rebellious Jacobitism. Though the SSPCK schools eventually taught in Gaelic, the overall effect contributed to the erosion of Highland culture. Literacy rates were lower in the Highlands than in comparable Lowland rural society, and despite these efforts illiteracy remained prevalent into the nineteenth century.

== Nineteenth century ==
=== Church schools ===
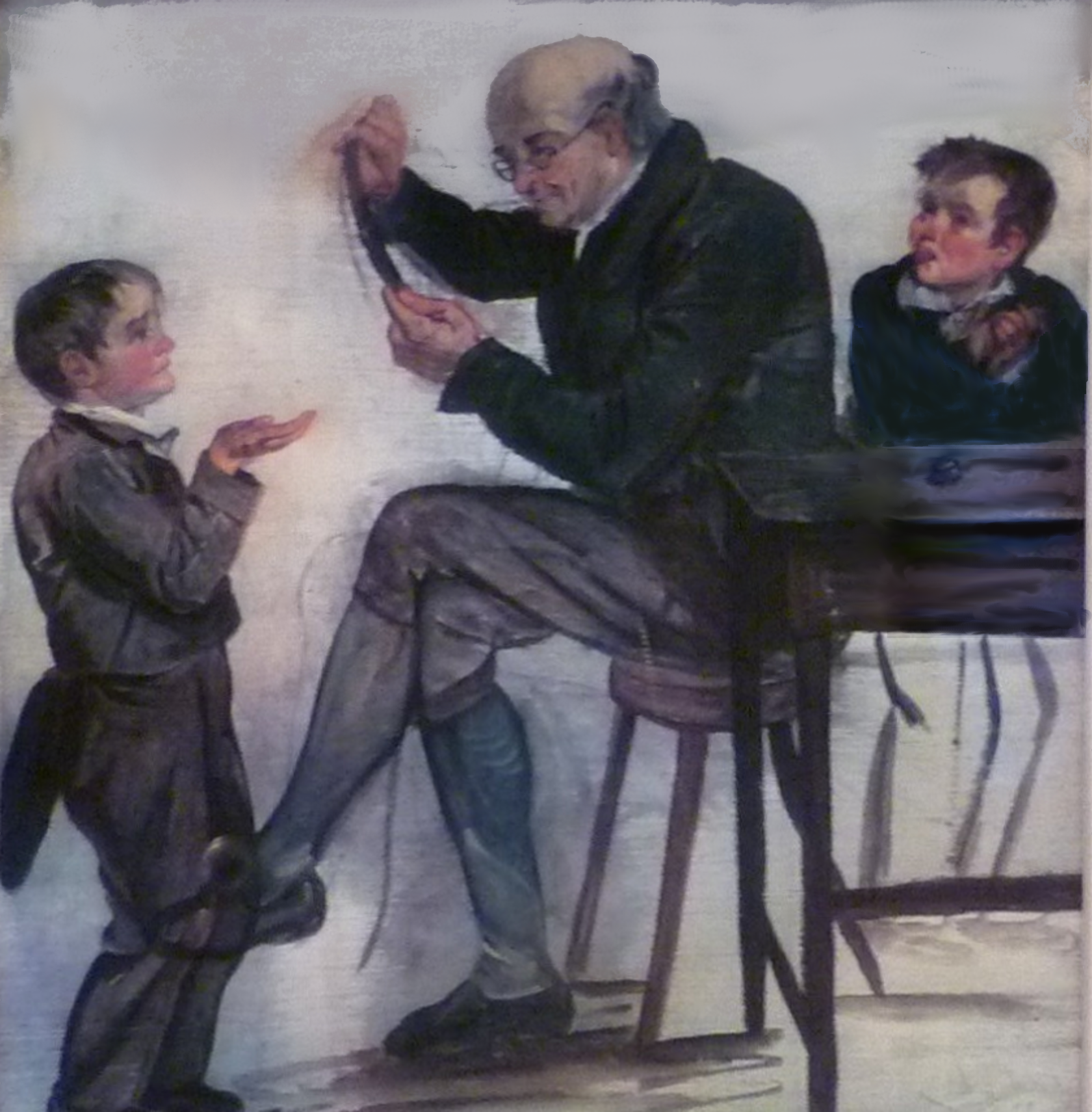
A schoolmaster administering punishment with the tawse

As society urbanised and population expanded there was a growing shortfall in provision. The General Assembly of the Church of Scotland formed an education committee in 1824. The committee had established 214 "assembly schools" by 1865. There were also 120 "sessional schools", mainly established by kirk sessions in towns and aimed at the children of the poor. The Disruption of 1843, which created the breakaway Free Church of Scotland, fragmented the kirk school system. 408 teachers in schools joined the breakaway Free Church. By May 1847 it was claimed that 500 schools had been built, along with two teacher training colleges and a ministerial training college, 513 schoolmasters were being paid direct from a central education fund and over 44,000 children being taught in Free Church schools. The influx of large numbers of Irish immigrants in the nineteenth century led to the establishment of Catholic schools, particularly in the urban west of the country, beginning with Glasgow in 1817. By 1872 there were 65 Catholic schools with 12,000 pupils. The church schools system was now divided between three major bodies, the established Kirk, the Free Church and the Catholic Church.

=== Supplementary education ===
Attempts to supplement the parish system included Sunday schools. Originally begun in the 1780s by town councils, they were adopted by all religious denominations in the nineteenth century. The movement peaked in the 1890s. By 1890 the Baptists had more Sunday schools than churches and were teaching over 10,000 children. In 1895, 50,000 teachers were working within the Church of Scotland in these schools and 60 per cent of children aged 5–15 in Glasgow were enrolled on their books. From the 1830s and 1840s there were also mission schools, ragged schools, Bible societies and improvement classes, open to members of all forms of Protestantism and particularly aimed at the growing urban working classes. The ragged school movement attempted to provide free education to destitute children. The ideas were taken up in Aberdeen where Sheriff William Watson founded the House of Industry and Refuge, and they were championed by Scottish minister Thomas Guthrie who wrote Plea for Ragged Schools (1847), after which they rapidly spread across Britain.

=== Theory and practice ===
Scots played a major part in the development of teacher education. Andrew Bell (1753–1832) pioneered the Monitorial System, by which the more able pupils would pass on the information they had learned to other children and which developed into the pupil-teacher system of training. It was further developed by John Wood, Sheriff-Depute of Peebles, who tended to favour fierce competition in the classroom and strict discipline. In contrast David Stow (1793–1864), who founded the first infant school in Scotland, in Glasgow in 1828, emphasised the importance of play and was highly influential on the development of the idea of school playgrounds. He focused on the bond between teacher and child and advocated the "Glasgow method", which centred on trained adult teachers. He established the first teacher training college in the United Kingdom, the Glasgow Normal Seminary. When, after the Great Disruption it was declared the property of the Church of Scotland, he founded the Free Church Normal Seminary in 1845. Ultimately Wood's ideas played a greater role in the Scottish educational system as they fitted with the need for rapid expansion and low costs that resulted from the reforms of 1872. Scottish schoolmasters gained a reputation for strictness and frequent use of the tawse, a belt of horse hide split at one end that inflicted stinging punishment on the hands of pupils.

=== Commissions ===
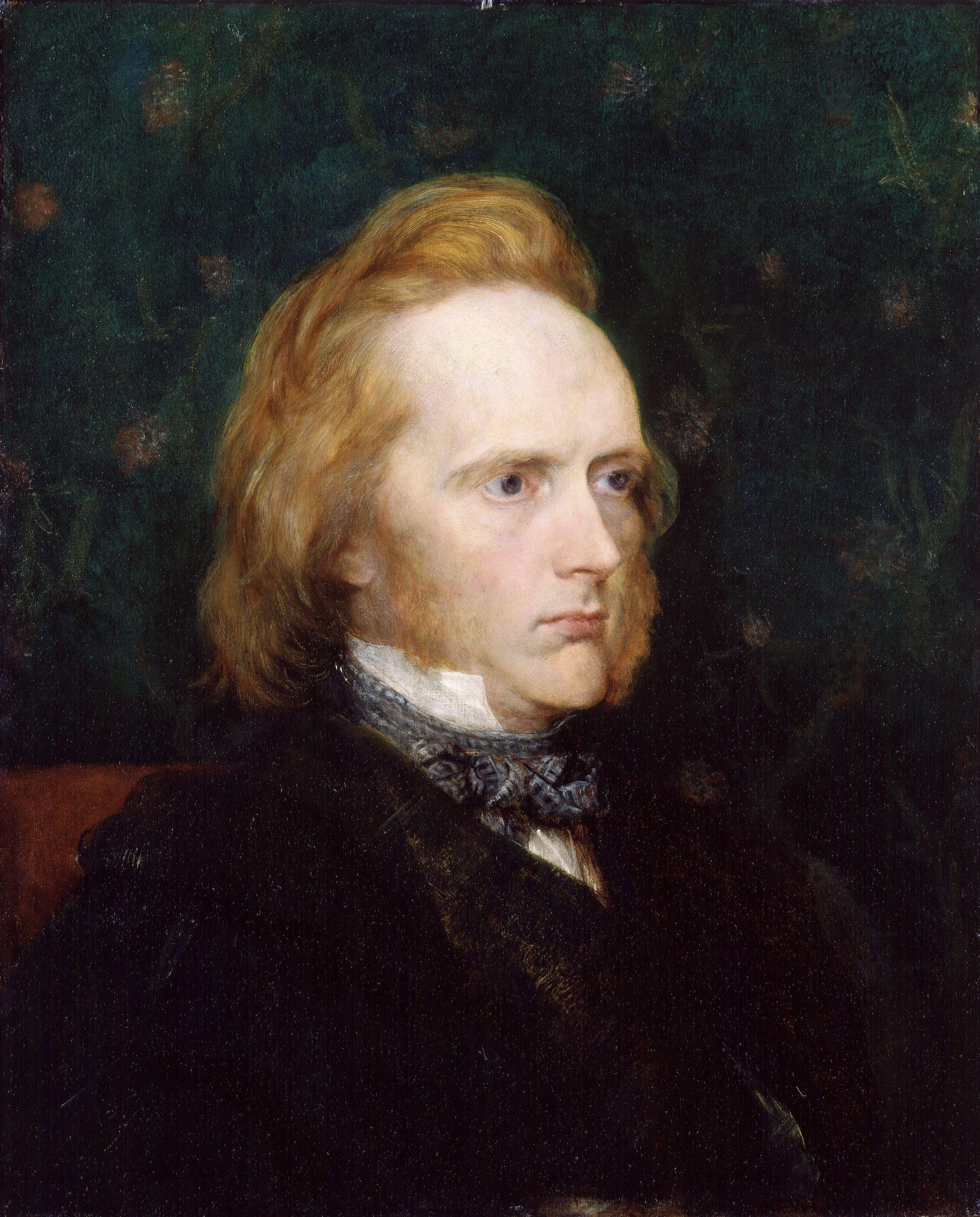
Commissioner George Douglas Campbell, the Duke of Argyll (c. 1860) by George Frederic Watts

The perceived problems and fragmentation of the Scottish school system led to a process of secularisation, as the state took increasing control. From 1830 the state began to fund buildings with grants, then from 1846 it was funding schools by direct sponsorship. The Education Act 1861 removed the provision stating that Scottish teachers had to be members of the Church of Scotland or subscribe to the Westminster Confession. In 1866 the government established the Argyll Commission, under Whig grandee George Campbell, 8th Duke of Argyll, to look into the schooling system. It found that of 500,000 children in need of education 200,000 were receiving it under efficient conditions, 200,000 in schools of doubtful merit, without any inspection and 90,000 were receiving no education at all. Although this compared favourably with the situation in England, with 14 per cent more children in education and with relatively low illiteracy rates of between 10 and 20 per cent, similar to those in the best educated nations such as those in Germany, the Netherlands, Switzerland and Scandinavia, the report was used as support for widespread reform. The result was the Education (Scotland) Act 1872, based on that passed for England and Wales as the Elementary Education Act 1870, but providing a more comprehensive solution.

=== 1872 act ===
Under the act approximately 1,000 regional School Boards were established and, unlike in England where they merely attempted to fill gaps in provision, immediately took over the schools of the old and new kirks and were able to begin to enforce attendance, rather than after the decade necessary in England. Some ragged and industrial schools requested to be taken over by the boards, while others continued as Sunday schools. All children aged from 5 to 13 years were to attend. Poverty was not accepted as an excuse and some help was supplied under the poor law. This was enforced by the School Attendance Committee, while the boards busied themselves with building to fill the gaps in provision. This resulted in a major programme that created large numbers of grand, purpose-built schools. Overall administration was in the hands of the Scotch (later Scottish) Education Department in London. Demand for places was high and for a generation after the act there was overcrowding in many classrooms, with up to 70 children being taught in one room. The emphasis on a set number of passes at exams also led to much learning by rote and the system of inspection led to even the weakest children being drilled with certain facts. There was an extensive programme of school building undertaken by the boards between 1872 and 1914. Where there was space these new board schools were two stories tall, but on crowded urban sites they could be four stories tall and designed to house 1,000 children. The Episcopalian and Catholic schools remained outside of the system, with the number of Catholic schools growing to 188 by 1900, serving 58,000 pupils.

=== Secondary education ===
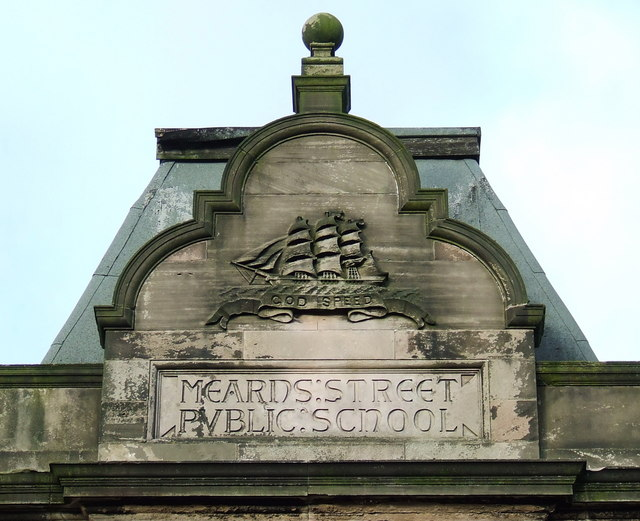
The Mearns Street Public School built for the Greenock Burgh School Board still bears its name, carved on the stone pediment above the entrance

Unlike the English act, the Scottish one made some provision for secondary education. The Scottish Education Department intended to expand secondary education, but did not intend to produce a universal system. The preferred method was to introduce vocational supplementary teaching in the elementary schools, later known as advanced divisions, up until the age of 14, when pupils would leave to find work. This was controversial because it seemed to counter the cherished principle that schooling was a potential route to university for the bright "lad o' parts". Larger urban school boards established about 200 "higher grade" (secondary) schools as a cheaper alternative to the burgh schools. Some of these were former grammar schools, such as the Glasgow and Edinburgh High Schools, Aberdeen New High School and Perth Academy. Some hospitals became day schools and largely remained independent, while a few, including Fettes College in Edinburgh, became public schools on the English model. Other public schools emerged around the mid century, such as Merchiston, Loretto School and Trinity College, Glenalmond. The result of these changes was a fear that secondary education became much harder to access for the children of the poor. However, in the second half of the century roughly a quarter of university students can be described as having working class origins, largely from the skilled and independent sectors of the economy. The Scottish Education Department introduced a Leaving Certificate Examination in 1888 to set national standards for secondary education. In 1890 school fees were abolished, creating a state-funded, national system of compulsory free basic education with common examinations.

== Twentieth century ==
=== Early twentieth century ===
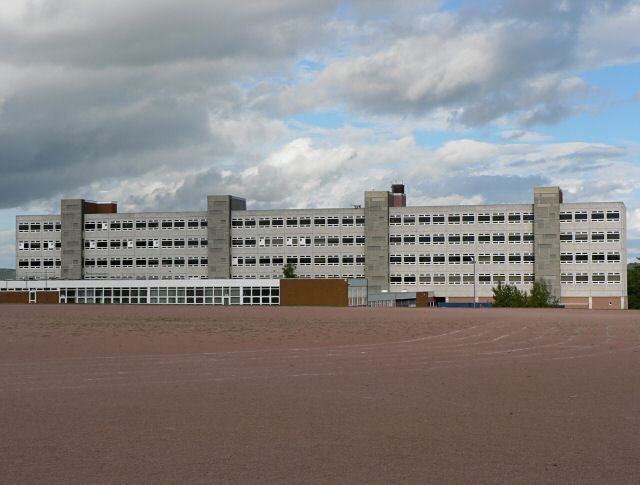
Perth High School, opened in 1950

The Education (Scotland) Act 1918 introduced the principle of universal free secondary education, although, due to financial crisis and resistance from the SED, it took almost two decades to implement. Most of the advanced divisions of the primary schools became junior secondaries, where students received a vocationally orientated education until the age of 14. The old academies and Higher Grade schools became senior secondaries, giving a more academic education, presenting students for the leaving certificate, which was the entry qualification for the universities. Selection between the two types of school was determined at age 12 by an intelligence test, the "qualifying examination", known colloquially as "the qualy". The 1918 Act brought the Episcopalian and Roman Catholic schools into the state system. While most Episcopalian schools would be absorbed through local mergers, the 224 Catholic schools, with 94,000 pupils in 1918, retained their distinct religious character, access to schools by priests and the requirement that school staff be acceptable to the Church. This move led to prolonged objections from some Protestants who complained that the state funding of Catholic schools was "Rome on the rates". The Act also replaced the School Boards with 38 specialist local education authorities, which were elected by a form of proportional representation in order to protect the rights of the Catholic minority. These would be subsumed into local government in 1929. Between the wars new school building was mainly associated with suburban growth. Space was less constrained and styles tended to be simpler with some experiments in modernism.

Unlike the Education Act 1944 in England and Wales, which established the tripartite system, the Education (Scotland) Act 1945 (8 & 9 Geo. 6. c. 37) was a consolidation measure, because universal secondary education had already been in place for over a decade. Plans to raise the school leaving age to 15 in the 1940s were never ratified, but increasing numbers stayed on beyond elementary education and it was eventually raised to 16 in 1973. As a result, secondary education was the major area of growth, particularly for girls, who stayed on in full-time education in increasing numbers throughout the century. The 1947 Report on Secondary Education by the Education Advisory Council, established by Labour minister Tom Johnston, proposed an end to selection and, although rejected by Labour and Conservative governments, became a benchmark for reform.

=== Late twentieth century ===
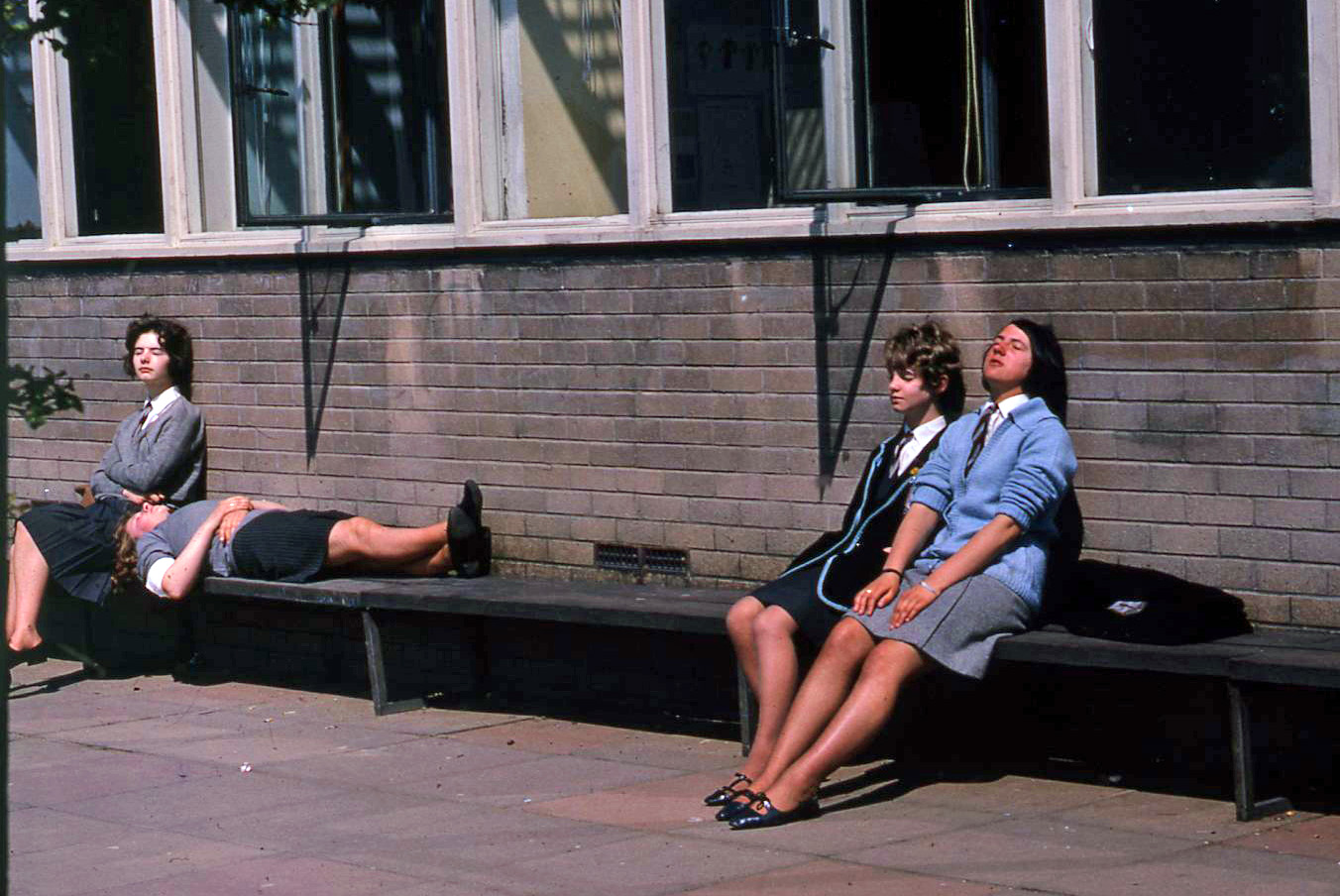
Girls at Cranhill Secondary School, Glasgow, 1967. The increased opportunities for girls in secondary education were a major feature of twentieth century schooling.

Selection was ended by the Labour government in 1965, which recommended that councils produced one kind of comprehensive secondary school that took all the children in a given neighbourhood. By the late 1970s 75 per cent of children were in non-selective schools and by the early 1980s only the five per cent of children in private schools were subject to selection. New schools were mainly associated with the creation of new towns and housing schemes. There was no distinctive Scottish style of school building in this period and patterns reflected those used in England, tending to be more open in plan and less rigid in design. Existing schools were also adapted for more child-centred learning.

New qualifications were developed to cope with changing aspirations and economics, with the Leaving Certificate being replaced by the Scottish Certificate of Education Ordinary Grade ('O-Grade') and Higher Grade ('Higher') qualifications in 1962, which became the basic entry qualification for university study. In the 1980s these were replaced by the Standard Grade qualifications. The greater availability of academic qualifications encouraged students to stay on at school. In 1967 22 per cent of students stayed on beyond age 15, but by 1994 the number staying on beyond 16 was 74 per cent. The reorganisation of local government in 1975, which transferred education to nine mainland and three smaller island authorities, allowing those containing large urban centres, to redistribute resources to poorer areas, making education part of a programme of wider social reform. In the 1980s the curriculum was reformed to take account of the whole range of abilities. In 1955 only 22 per cent of pupils achieved five or more passes at ordinary grade. By 1995 the proportion achieving the equivalent in the standard grade was 55 per cent. Gender differences disappeared as girls' attainment caught up with boys in the early 1980s.

== See also ==
- Education in Scotland
- History of education in Scotland
