= Education Act =

Stock short title used for legislation

Education Act (with its variations) is a stock short title used for legislation in Australia, Hong Kong, India, Malaysia, New Zealand, Ontario, the United Kingdom and the United States that relates to education. The Bill for an Act with this short title will have been known as an Education Bill during its passage through Parliament.

The Education Acts may be a generic name either for legislation bearing that short title or for all legislation which relates to education.

== List ==
=== Australia ===
- The 1893 Education Act of Western Australia
- The Education Act 1872 (Vic)

=== Hong Kong ===
- The Education Ordinance 1971

=== India ===
- Kerala Education Bill, 1957
- Education Bill that became the Right of Children to Free and Compulsory Education Act, 2009

=== Malaysia ===
- The Education Act 1996

=== New Zealand ===
- The Education Act 1877
- The Education Act 1914

=== Ontario ===
- Education Act, R.S.O. 1990, c. E.2

=== United Kingdom ===
- The Elementary Education Acts 1870 to 1893, the collective title of the following acts:
  - The Elementary Education Act 1870 (33 & 34 Vict. c. 75) – the Forster Act
  - The Elementary Education Act 1873 (36 & 37 Vict. c. 86)
  - The Elementary Education Act 1876 (39 & 40 Vict. c. 70) – the Sandon Act
  - The Elementary Education (Industrial Schools) Act 1879 (42 & 43 Vict. c 48)
  - The Elementary Education Act 1880 (43 & 44 Vict. c. 23) – the Mundella Act
  - The Education Code Act 1890 (53 & 54 Vict. c. 22)
  - The Elementary Education Act 1891 (54 & 55 Vict. c. 56)
  - The Elementary Education (Blind and Deaf Children) Act 1893 (56 & 57 Vict. c. 42)
  - The Elementary Education (School Attendance) Act 1893 (56 & 57 Vict. c. 51)
- The Education Act 1901 (1 Edw. 7. c. 11)
- The Education Act 1901 (Renewal) Act 1902 (2 Edw. 7. c. 19)
- The Education Act 1902 (2 Edw. 7. c. 42) – sometimes known as the Balfour Act
- The Education (Provision of Meals) Act 1906
- The Education (Administrative Provisions) Act 1907
- The Education Act 1918 (8 & 9 Geo. 5. c. 39) – sometimes known as the Fisher Act
- The Education Act 1936 (26 Geo. 5 & 1 Edw. 8. c. 41)
- The Education Act 1944 (7 & 8 Geo. 6. c. 31) – sometimes known as the Butler Act
- The Education (Miscellaneous Provisions) Act 1948 (11 & 12 Geo. 6. c. 40) (repealed 1 November 1996)
- The Education Act 1964 (c. 82)
- The Education Act 1968 (c. 17)
- The Education Act 1976 (c. 81)
- The Education Act 1979 (c. 49)
- The Education Act 1980 (c. 20)
- The Education Act 1981 (c. 60)
- The Education (No. 2) Act 1986 (c. 61)
- The Education Reform Act 1988 (c. 40)
- The Further and Higher Education Act 1992 (c. 13)
- The Education Act 1994 (c. 30)
- The Education Act 1996 (c. 56)
- The School Standards and Framework Act 1998 (c. 31)
- The Teaching and Higher Education Act 1998 (c. 30)
- The Education Act 2002 (c. 32)
- The Higher Education Act 2004 (c. 8)
- The Education Act 2005 (c. 18)
- The Education and Inspections Act 2006 (c. 40)
- The Education Act 2011 (c. 21)

==== Scotland ====
- The Education Act 1496 (c. 87)
- The School Establishment Act 1616
- The Education Act 1633 (c. 5)
- The Education Act 1646 (c. 46)
- The Education Act 1696 (c. 26)
- The Education (Scotland) Act 1980 (c. 44)
- The Further and Higher Education (Scotland) Act 1992 (c. 37)
- The Education (Additional Support for Learning) (Scotland) Act 2004 (asp 4) – an act of the Scottish Parliament
- The Education (Additional Support for Learning) (Scotland) Act 2009 (asp 7) – an act of the Scottish Parliament

The Education (Scotland) Acts 1872 to 1893 was the collective title of the following Acts:

- The Education (Scotland) Act 1872 (35 & 36 Vict. c. 62)
- The Education (Scotland) Act 1878 (41 & 42 Vict. c. 78)
- The Public Schools (Scotland) Teachers Act 1882 (45 & 46 Vict. c. 18)
- The Education (Scotland) Act 1883 (46 & 47 Vict. c. 56)
- The Parliamentary Grant (Caithness and Sutherland) Act 1889 (52 & 53 Vict. c. 75)
- The Education of Blind and Death-Mute Children (Scotland) Act 1890 (53 & 54 Vict. c. 43)
- The Day Industrial Schools (Scotland) Act 1893 (56 & 57 Vict. c. 12)

==== Ireland ====
- The Education Act 1695 (7 Will. 3. c. 4 (I)) – act of the Parliament of Ireland

=== United States ===
- The Higher Education Act of 1965
- Elementary and Secondary Education Act1965
- The Elementary and Secondary Education Act of 1965
- Florida House Bill 1069
- No Child Left Behind Act 2001
- Every Student Succeeds Act2016

== See also ==
- List of short titles
