= Compulsory education =

Period of education required for a person

Years of compulsory education or schooling

Compulsory education refers to a period of education that is required of all people and is imposed by the government. This education may take place at a registered school or at home or other places.

Compulsory school attendance or compulsory schooling means that parents are obliged to send their children to a state-approved school.

All countries except Bhutan, Botswana,, Burundi, Cambodia, Fiji, Mozambique, Niger, Papua New Guinea, Solomon Islands, Vanuatu, and Vatican City (which does not have any child citizens or child residents) have compulsory education laws.

== Purpose ==
In the late 19th century to the start of the 20th century, education was viewed as a means of teaching children how to be productive American citizens, instilling a common set of values and ethics as well as socializing immigrant children to fit in the unacquainted society of a new country. It is mostly used to advance the education of all citizens, minimize the number of students who stop going to school because of family economic reasons, and balance the education differences between rural and urban areas.

The overall correlation between the level of access to education in a country and the skills of its student population is weak. This disconnect between education access and education quality may be the consequence of weak capacity to implement education policies or lack of information on the part of policymakers on how to promote student learning. In other situations, governments might be intentionally motivated to provide education for reasons that have nothing to do with improving the knowledge and skills of citizens. Human and social capital are especially important towards society and many low and middle-income countries have made sure to increase their policies on compulsory education in order to help reproduce the generational transmission of human capital. Ensuring that individuals have these skills may allow for beneficial social outcomes and can potentially help improve earnings. Survey studies have also shown significant beneficial outcomes for women and early child development with the access to free resources, like education.

Throughout history, compulsory education laws have typically been the latest form of education intervention enacted by states. In general, governments in Europe and Latin America began to intervene in primary education an average of 107 years before democratization as measured by Polity. Compulsory education laws, despite being one of the last measures introduced by central governments seeking to regulate primary education, nevertheless were implemented an average of 52 years before democratization as measured by Polity and 36 years before universal male suffrage. With the increase of free education, research shows significant findings that compulsory education helps decrease the wealth gap and allows for a higher opportunity towards social equality.

Historically, there is a trend of mass education being introduced in the aftermath of civil wars. According to a 2022 study, nondemocracies frequently introduced mass education to teach obedience and respect for authority.

== History ==
=== Antiquity to medieval times ===
Compulsory education was not unheard of in ancient times. However, instances are generally tied to royal, religious or military organizations—substantially different from modern notions of compulsory education.

Renown Plato's work The Republic (c. 424 – c. 348 BCE) is credited with having popularized the concept of compulsory education in Western intellectual thought. Plato's rationale was straightforward. The ideal city would require ideal individuals, and ideal individuals would require an ideal education. The popularization of Plato's ideas began with the wider Renaissance and the translation of Plato's works by Marsilio Ficino (1434–1499), culminating in the Enlightenment. The Enlightenment philosopher Jean-Jacques Rousseau, known for his own work on education (including Emile, or On Education), said, 'To get a good idea of public education, read Plato's Republic. It is not a political treatise, as those who merely judge books by their title think, but it is the finest, most beautiful work on education ever written.'

In Sparta boys between the age 6 and 7 left their homes and were sent to military school. School courses were harsh and have been described as a "brutal training period". Between the age of 18 and 20, Spartan males had to pass a test that consisted of fitness, military ability, and leadership skills. A student's failure meant a forfeiture of citizenship (perioidos) and political rights. Passing was a rite of passage to manhood and citizenry, in which he would continue to serve in the military and train as a soldier until the age of 60 when the soldier could retire to live with his family.

Every parent in Judea since ancient times was required to teach their children at least informally. Over the centuries, as cities, towns and villages developed, a class of teachers called Rabbis evolved. According to the Talmud (tractate Bava Bathra 21a), which praises the sage Joshua ben Gamla with the institution of formal Jewish education in the 1st century AD, Ben Gamla instituted schools in every town and made formal education compulsory from age 6 to 8.

The Aztec Triple Alliance, which ruled from 1428 to 1521 in what is now central Mexico, is considered to be the first state to implement a system of universal compulsory education, although earlier Nahua states may have had it as well.

=== Early modern era ===
The Protestant Reformation prompted the establishment of compulsory education for boys and girls, first in regions that are now part of Germany, and later in Europe and in the United States.

Martin Luther's text An die Ratsherren aller Städte deutschen Landes (To the Councillors of all Towns in German Countries, 1524) called for establishing compulsory schooling so that all parishioners would be able to read the Bible by themselves. The Protestant South-West of the Holy Roman Empire soon followed suit. In 1559, the German Duchy Württemberg established a compulsory education system for boys. In 1592, the German Duchy Palatine Zweibrücken became the first territory in the world with compulsory education for girls and boys, followed in 1598 by Strasbourg, then a free city of the Holy Roman Empire and now part of France.

In Scotland, the School Establishment Act 1616 commanded every parish to establish a school for everyone paid for by parishioners. The Parliament of Scotland confirmed this with the Education Act 1633 and created a local land-based tax to provide the required funding. The required majority support of parishioners, however, provided a tax evasion loophole which heralded the Education Act 1646. The turmoil of the age meant that in 1661 there was a temporary reversion to the less compulsory 1633 position. However, a new Education Act 1696 re-established the compulsory provision of a school in every parish with a system of fines, sequestration, and direct government implementation as a means of enforcement where required, making Scotland the first country with national compulsory education.

In the United States, following Luther and other Reformers, the Separatist Congregationalists who founded Plymouth Colony in 1620, obliged parents to teach their children how to read and write. The Massachusetts School Laws, three legislative acts enacted in the Massachusetts Bay Colony in 1642, 1647, and 1648, are commonly regarded as the first steps toward compulsory education in the United States. The 1647 law, in particular, required every town having more than 50 families to hire a teacher, and every town of more than 100 families to establish a school. The Puritan zeal for learning was reflected in the early and rapid rise of educational institutions; e.g., Harvard College was founded as early as 1636.

Prussia implemented a modern compulsory education system in 1763. It was introduced by the Generallandschulreglement (General School Regulation), a decree of Frederick the Great in 1763–5. The Generallandschulreglement, authored by Johann Julius Hecker, asked for all young citizens, girls and boys, to be educated from age 5 to age 13–14 and to be provided with a basic outlook on (Christian) religion, singing, reading and writing based on a regulated, state-provided curriculum of text books. The teachers, often former soldiers, were asked to cultivate silk worms to make a living besides contributions from the local citizens and municipalities.

In Austria, Hungary and the Lands of the Bohemian Crown (Czech lands), mandatory primary education was introduced by Empress Maria Theresa in 1774.

=== Late modern era ===
Compulsory school attendance based on the Prussian model gradually spread to other countries. It was quickly adopted by the governments in Denmark-Norway and Sweden, and also in Finland, Estonia and Latvia within the Russian Empire, and later England and Wales and France.

Due to population growth and the proliferation of compulsory education, UNESCO calculated in 2006 that over the subsequent 30 years, more people would receive formal education than in all prior human history.

==== France ====
France was slow to introduce compulsory education, this time due to conflicts between the secular state and the Catholic Church, and as a result between anti-clerical and Catholic political parties. During the July Monarchy, government officials proposed a variety of public primary education provisions, culminating in the Guizot Law of 28 June 1833. The Guizot law mandated that all communes provide education for boys and required that schools implement a curriculum focused on religious and moral instruction. The first set of Jules Ferry Laws, passed in 1881, extended the central government's role in education well beyond the provisions of the Guizot Law, and made primary education free for girls and boys. In 1882, the second set of Jules Ferry Laws made education compulsory for girls and boys until the age of 13. In 1936, the upper age limit was raised to 14. In 1959, it was further extended to 16.

==== United States ====
In 1852, Massachusetts was the first U.S. state to pass a compulsory universal public education law. In particular, the Massachusetts General Court required every town to create and operate a grammar school. Fines were imposed on parents who did not send their children to school, and the government took the power to take children away from their parents and apprentice them to others if government officials decided that the parents were "unfit to have the children educated properly." In 1918, Mississippi became the last state to enact a compulsory attendance law.

In 1922 an attempt was made by the voters of Oregon to enact the Oregon Compulsory Education Act, which would require all children between the ages of 8 and 16 to attend public schools, only leaving exceptions for mentally or physically unfit children, exceeding a certain living distance from a state school, or having written consent from a county superintendent to receive private instruction. The law was passed by popular vote but was later ruled unconstitutional by the United States Supreme Court in Pierce v. Society of Sisters, determining that "a child is not a mere creature of the state." This case settled the dispute about whether or not private schools had the right to do business and educate within the United States.

==== Russia/USSR ====
In the Soviet Union, a compulsory education provision law was implemented in 1930. State-provided education during this era was primarily focused on eradicating illiteracy. In line with the overall goals of the regime's Five Year Plans, the motivation behind education provision and literacy instruction was to "train a new generation of technically skilled and scientifically literate citizens." Industrial development needed more skilled workers of all kinds. No possible source of talent could be left untapped, and the only way of meeting these needs was by the rapid development of a planned system of mass education." Soviet schools "responded to the economic requirements of society" by emphasizing "basic formation in math, and polytechnic knowledge related to economic production." The Soviet regime's deliberate expansion of mass education supremacy was what most impressed the U.S. education missions to the USSR in the 1950s.

==== China ====
China's nine-year compulsory education was formally established in 1986 as part of its economic modernization program. It was designed to promote "universalization", the closure of the education gap by economic development and between rural and urban areas by provision of safe and high-quality schools. The program initially faced shortages due to a huge population and weak economic foundation, but by 1999 primary and junior middle schools respectively served 90% and 85% of the national population.

== Timeline of introduction ==
Date of introduction of compulsory education by country or territory

=== 1700s ===
- 1739: Denmark-Norway (Norway)
- 1763: Prussia (former kingdom located in what is now Germany)
- 1774: Austria, Hungary, Czech Republic, Slovakia (former states of the Austrian Empire)

=== 1800s ===
- 1805: Liechtenstein
- 1812: Spain (de facto compulsory requirement by 1830, "Art. 25. 6 The exercise of the rights of citizenship is suspended—. And, from and after the year 1830, by being unable to read and write.")
- 1814: Denmark
- 1817: Travancore (former kingdom located in what is now India)
- 1824: Ottoman Empire (Turkey)
- 1834: Greece
- 1841: Hawaii (former Kingdom of Hawaii located in what is now the State of Hawaii)
- 1842: Sweden
- 1844: Portugal
- 1864: Romania
- 1868: Montenegro
- 1869: Italy, Costa Rica
- 1870: Colombia
- 1871: Earliest introduction in Canada and Australia; see Education in Canada and Education in Australia for a timeline of individual states.
- 1872: Japan, earliest introduction in the United Kingdom; see Education in the United Kingdom for a timeline of individual states.
- 1874: Switzerland
- 1876: Guyana, Suriname
- 1877: New Zealand, Uruguay
- 1878: Bulgaria
- 1880: Venezuela
- 1882: France, Serbia
- 1884: Argentina
- 1886: Colombia (abolished)
- 1890: Barbados
- 1892: Ireland (pre-partition as a territory of the United Kingdom)
- 1897: Ecuador

=== 1900s ===
- 1900: Netherlands
- 1901: Philippines (de facto compulsory under U.S. Military Administration, Philippines later granted independence)
- 1905: Peru
- 1906: Namibia (only for white children with less than 4 km to the nearest school)
- 1907: Iceland
- 1909: Paraguay
- 1910: (Japan) Taiwan
- 1912: Luxembourg
- 1913: Albania
- 1917: Mexico
- 1919: Belgium, Latvia, Germany (Weimar Constitution), Poland (only for children with less than 3 km to the nearest school)
- 1920: Chile, Estonia, Eswatini (white children only)
- 1921: Finland, Thailand
- 1922: Lithuania
- 1923: Nauru
- 1924: Ukrainian SSR (Ukraine)
- 1925: Mongolia
- 1926: Byelorussian SSR (Belarus)
- 1927: Colombia (reintroduced)
- 1929: Yugoslavia (presumably all former constituent states retained compulsory education)
- 1930: India^{1}, USSR^{1} (Russia)

(^{1} Presumably all former constituent states of both nations retained compulsory education.)

- 1935: Afghanistan
- 1943: Iran
- 1945: Sri Lanka
- 1946: Malta
- 1949: Israel
- 1951: Libya
- 1952: Jordan
- 1953: Egypt, South Korea
- 1956: Poland (all children)
- 1960: Chad
- 1961: Ghana
- 1962: Cyprus, Mali
- 1963: Algeria, Morocco
- 1964: Mozambique (children with less than three miles to the nearest school)
- 1965: Kuwait
- 1968: Taiwan
- 1971: United Arab Emirates
- 1973: Indonesia
- 1975: Somalia
- 1976: Iraq
- 1976: Hong Kong
- 1981: Seychelles, Syria
- 1986: People's Republic of China
- 1988: Brazil, Philippines
- 1990: Bangladesh, Yemen, Namibia (all children)
- 1991: Tunisia
- 1994: Samoa
- 1996: Laos, Afghanistan (abolished for women)
- 1997: Macao
- 1998: Lebanon, Sudan

=== 2000s ===
- 2000: Singapore
- 2001: Mauritania, Afghanistan (reintroduced for women)
- 2003: Liberia, Malaysia, Sierra Leone
- 2005: Bahrain
- 2007: Brunei
- 2008: Uganda, Oman
- 2010: Lesotho
- 2021: Afghanistan (secondary school abolished for women)

=== Countries without compulsory education ===
- Bhutan
- Botswana
- Burundi
- Cambodia
- Fiji
- Mozambique
- Niger
- Papua New Guinea
- Solomon Islands
- Vanuatu
- Vatican City – note: Since the Disappearance of Emanuela Orlandi, citizenship requirements have been tightened for non-religious lay residents of Vatican City, and a minimum age of 25 was imposed.

== By country ==
The following table indicates at what ages compulsory education starts and ends in different countries. The most common age for starting compulsory education is 6, but that varies between 3 and 8.

Country/Region	Lower age range	Upper age range	Notes
Argentina	4	18	
Australia	5-6	15/17	Upper age limit varies among states. Waived if pursuing full-time employment or full-time education.
Austria	6	15	Compulsory education requires nine years spent in school. After completing all mandatory schooldays, it is obligatory to attend a secondary school or do an apprenticeship until the age of 18.
Belgium	5	18	In Belgium, only compulsory education applies. School is not compulsory.
Bosnia and Herzegovina	6	15	
Bulgaria	4	16	Since 2020, compulsory education includes three years of preschool education before children start primary school.
Brazil	4	17	Last changed in 2009.
Canada	5–7	16/18	Children who turn five by 31 December are required to begin schooling in British Columbia, New Brunswick, Nova Scotia, and Yukon. In Alberta, Newfoundland and Labrador, the Northwest Territories, Ontario, Prince Edward Island, and Quebec, a child is required to attend school at the age of six. Manitoba and Saskatchewan are the only provinces where the minimum compulsory attendance age is seven. Attendance in school is compulsory until the student reaches the age of 16 in all provinces except Manitoba, Ontario, and New Brunswick, where attendance is compulsory until the student is 18 years old.
China	6	15	See also compulsory education in China.
Costa Rica	4	17	
Croatia	6	15	
Cyprus	5	15	Compulsory education starts with one mandatory year of pre-primary (preschool) education.
Czech Republic	5	15	Compulsory education requires one year spent in pre-school and nine years spent in school. Beginning age is negotiable ± 1 year.
Denmark	6	16	
Egypt	6	14	
England and Wales	5	16	Requirement is for a full-time education, but attendance at a school is not compulsory (section 7 of The Education Act 1996).
Estonia	6/7	15/16	6 year olds can enter if they turn 7 by 1 October in the same year.
Finland	7	18	Beginning age is negotiable ± 1 year. The law changed at the end of 2020 from the age of 15 to now 18.
France	3	16	Compulsory education only
Germany	6	16	Varies slightly between states.
Greece	5	15	Compulsory education starts with one mandatory year of pre-primary (preschool) education.
Haiti	6	11	The Haitian Constitution mandates that education be free of charge. However, even public schools charge substantial fees. 80% of children go to private schools.
Hong Kong	6	15	Hong Kong laws state that education is mandatory for 9 years (primary and junior secondary) and free for 15 years (kindergarten, primary and secondary) except for private schools or subsidized schools.
Hungary	3	16	Since 2015, kindergarten is compulsory from age 3, although exceptions are made for developmental reasons.
India	3	18	The Right of Children to Free and Compulsory Education Act in August 2009 made education free and compulsory for children aged between 6 and 14. This was further updated by National Education Policy 2020 which made education free and compulsory for children aged between 3 and 18.
Indonesia	6	18	
Iran	6	12	
Ireland	5	16	Students must go to schools from ages 5 to 16 or until they have completed three years of second-level of education.
Israel	3	16	Compulsory education takes place from kindergarten through to 10th grade.
Italy	6	16	
Jamaica	5	16	Parents could face charges of child neglect if they prevent their children from going to school without valid reasons. Not enforced.
Japan	6	15	
Kenya	6	18	
Latvia	5	16	
Luxembourg	4	16	
Macao	3	18	The vast majority of private schools and all public schools in Macau participate in School Systems, which means tuition fees, supplementary service fees, registration fees, and certificate costs are uncharged. If a resident student attends a private school outside the free system, the government provides a tuition subsidy to help offset costs.
Malaysia	6	12	
Maldives	6	15	
Mexico	6	18	Schooling is required through upper secondary school (Preparatoria).
Morocco	6	15	
Netherlands	5	16	Students are allowed to leave early after obtaining their 'start qualification' (MBO level 2, HAVO or VWO degree).
New Zealand	6	16	Children typically commence school at five years. There is no direct cost until the age of 19.
Norway	6	15	A total of ten years (of study, and not schooling, as suggested here), where Primary school is year 1–7 (without grades), and Lower Secondary school (with grades) is year 8–10.
Philippines	5	18	This was modified from 6–16 in 2011 and 2012 due to the introduction of compulsory kindergarten and senior high school.
Poland	6	18	Compulsory education starts with one year of pre-school (kindergarten) education, after which children start primary education. Polish law distinguishes between compulsory school (obowiązek szkolny) and compulsory education (obowiązek nauki).
Portugal	6	18	It is the law that children living in Portugal (if they're 6 years old or more) must go to school. Home schooling is available with registration at a school and quarterly examinations in the Portuguese curriculum only.
Qatar	5	18	Education shall be compulsory and free for all children from the beginning of the primary stage until the end of the preparatory stage or the age of eighteen, whichever is earlier.
Romania	4–5	18–19	Since 2023, the second year of kindergarten became compulsory, bringing compulsory education to a total of 15 years. (see Education in Romania)
Russia	6	17	Student may leave after age 15 with the approval of parents and the local authority.
Scotland	5	16	A person is of school age if he has attained the age of five years and has not attained the age of sixteen years.
Slovenia	6	15	
Singapore	7	15	Compulsory Education Act 2000. Children who are homeschooled may be exempted from the Act. From 2019, children with moderate-to-severe special education needs are no longer exempt from the Act (children with mild special education needs were already covered by the Act).
Spain	6	16	
Sri Lanka	5	16	11 years of compulsory education from grade 1 to grade 11. 1997 — Compulsory Education RegulationsIssued under the Education Ordinance (No. 31 of 1939) by Gazette Notification No. 947/8, making it mandatory for all children aged 5 to 14 to attend school. The government extended the compulsory education age up to 16 years under Gazette Extraordinary No. 2009/42 (October 21, 2016), effective from 2017.
Sweden	6	16	All children registered in Sweden have to follow the law of 'skolplikt' (compulsory school attendance). Head teachers can only grant leave of absence if they determine that there are exceptional and very compelling reason for the child to take leave of absence from the school. To go on vacation with the family is usually not an exceptional reason to be granted leave of absence. A fine can be issued for those who do not follow the rules.
Switzerland	4–6	15	Varies by canton.
Syria	6	15	Typical ages for 9 years of compulsory education from grade 1 to grade 9.
Taiwan	7	15	Typical ages for 9 years (6–15) of compulsory education (starting from 1968) and optional extension (a.k.a. volunteer basic education) to age 18 (non-compulsory starting from 2014).
Thailand	4	15	Only compulsory education applies. School is not compulsory in Thailand.
Turkey	6	18	From the 1st to the 12th grade, education is compulsory. Starting in the educational year of 2012–2013, an education reform took effect to bring the compulsory education up to the end of high school. The system is commonly referred to as 4+4+4.
United States	5–8	16–19	Ages vary between states. Beginning age varies from 5 to 8, ending age varies from 16 to 19, though free public education through a traditional school is generally available until age 21 and as high as 23 in Ohio until an individual would need to obtain a high school diploma through other means such as a GED program. In Wisconsin v. Yoder, the Supreme Court determined in 1972 that Amish children could not be placed under compulsory education laws past the 8th grade.
Uruguay	6	14	
Zimbabwe	6	16	Typical ages for 11 years of compulsory education.

== Criticism ==
While compulsory education is mostly seen as important and useful, compulsory schooling is seen by some as obsolete and counterproductive in today's world and has repeatedly been the subject of sharp criticism. Critics of compulsory schooling argue that such education violates the freedom of children; is a method of political control; is ineffective at teaching children how to deal with the "real world" outside of school; and may have negative effects on children, leading to higher rates of apathy, bullying, stress, and depression. To most people's knowledge curricula are created in a way that will benefit society's productivity rather than fostering children's interests. They implement standards of skills that will be essential for the economy and other various factors that contribute towards an efficient society and government. Students from low-income families are more likely to drop out of school at a young age than any other socioeconomic group. Recent studies discovered that parents and teachers providing these students with understanding and greater independence on decision-making, could potentially help decrease their drop out rates.

== See also ==
- Universal access to education
- Child labour
- Democratic education
- History of education
- Raising of school leaving age
- State school
- Truancy
- Unschooling
