= List of acts of the Parliament of Scotland, 1639–1651 =

This is a list of acts of the Parliament of Scotland for the years 1633 to 1661.

It lists acts of Parliament of the old Parliament of Scotland, that was merged with the old Parliament of England to form the Parliament of Great Britain, by the Union with England Act 1707 (c. 7).

For other years, see list of acts of the Parliament of Scotland. For the period after 1707, see list of acts of the Parliament of Great Britain.

== Interregnum ==
All acts between 1633 and 1661 were deemed invalid after the Restoration by the Rescissory Act 1661, and are not considered to be valid acts of Parliament.

=== 1639 ===
- Act ordaining shirreffis and ingadderers of taxatione to be lyable only to produce horning. (30 September 1639)
- Act discharging the exportatioune of buck and gait skinnes. (4 October 1639)

=== 1640 ===
==== June ====
- c. 1 Acte anent the choosing of Robert, lord Burghlie to be president of this court and sessione of parliament in respect of the absence of the kingis commissioner.
- c. 2 Act anent the constitution of this parliament and all subsequent parliamentis. (2 June 1640)
- c. 4 Act anent the admission of ministeris to these kirkis which belonged to beshoprikis. (4 June 1640)
- c. 5 Anent the Large Declaratione or manifesto. (4 June 1640)
- Act for the border shyris. (4 June 1640)
- c. 6 Act in favouris of the Lady Loudoun and hir childrene. (5 June 1640)
- Yule Vacance Act 1640 (c. 7) Act dischairging the Yule vacance, appointing the session to sit doun the first of November and ryse the last of Februar, and to sit doune the first of June and ryise the last of Julii. (5 June 1640)
- c. 8 Act dischairging the granting of protections by the lordes of counsell and exchekker. (5 June 1640)
- c. 9 Act against papistis. (5 June 1640)
- c. 10 Act ratifiing the act of the lordis of session made for supplieing of the absence of the signet and dischairging the transporting thairof or any other seale in tymecomeing. (5 June 1640)
- c. 11 Act dischairging salmond fishing on Sunday. (5 June 1640)
- c. 12 Act statuarie appoynting parliaments to be holden once everie three yeir. (6 June 1640)
- c. 13 Act anent production of the registeris and recordis of parliament to the first session of each parliament. (6 June 1640)
- c. 14 Explaining the preceiding acts of parliament made against bandis and conventiones amongest the subjectis, as also declairing the bandis and conventiones mad and keiped since the beginning of the present troubles to be laufull. (6 June 1640)
- c. 15 Act dischairgeing the goeing of salt panes and mylnes upon the Sabboth day. (6 June 1640)
- c. 16 Act appoynting all grievances to be given in in plaine parliamente. (6 June 1640)
- c. 17 Annulling all unlaufull and unjust proclamationes mad under the paine of treason against the disobeyeris. (6 June 1640)
- c. 18 Act anent the ratification of the covenant and of the assemblies supplication, act of counsell and act of assemblie conserning the covenant. (6 June 1640)
- c. 19 Anent the ratificatione of the actes of the assemblie. (6 June 1640)
- c. 20 Act rescissorie. (6 June 1640)
- c. 21 Act anent the choosing of committies out of everie estate. (6 June 1640)
- c. 22 Appointing the feis for the procuratour, the clerke and agent for the kirke. (8 June 1640)
- c. 23 Anent the commoun releeffe. (8 June 1640)
- c. 24 Act for the committies of estates. (8 June 1640)
- c. 25 Anent vasselles of erectiones, that they be not subject in double payement nor the superiouris defraudit of there feue deuties. (8 June 1640)
- c. 26 Ratificatione of Generall Leslees proceedingis anno 1639. (9 June 1640)
- c. 27 Ratificatioun in favoures of Generall Leslie of his commissioun to be generall anno 1640. (9 June 1640)
- c. 28 Act anent the exchekker, declairing the samene to be onlie judges to materes concerning the managing of the kingis rentes and casualities. (9 June 1640)
- c. 29 Ratificatioun in favoures of Collonell Alexander Hamiltoun of his commissioun to be generall of the artilliarie. (9 June 1640)
- c. 30 Ratificatioun in favoures of Collonell Baillie of his commissioune to be generall majore. (9 June 1640)
- c. 31 Ratificatioun in favoures of Maister Alexander Gibsone of Durie of his commissioune to be generall commisser. (9 June 1640)
- c. 32 Ratificatione in favoures of Collonell Monro of his commissione to be generall major. (9 June 1640)
- c. 42 Remitt in favoures of James Arnot, merchand, to the committie of estates anent his shipe and ordinance. (9 June 1640)
- c. 43 Ordeaning the whole subjectis and leiges of this kingdome to obey, menteene and defend the conclusiones, actes and constitutiones of this present session of parliament, and to subscryve the band appoynted for that effect. (10 June 1640)
- c. 44 In favoures of the kinges vassellis of waird landes, recomending there prejudice by the act anno 1633 to the consideration of the nixt parliament and in the meane tyme while then suspending the force and executione of that act. (10 June 1640)
- c. 45 Act and decreet anent the foirfaultoure of Patrike, lord Ettrike and remanent commanderis haveing chairg wnder him within the castle of Edinburghe. (11 June 1640)
- c. 60 Declaration and cloisure of the parliamente. (11 June 1640)

==== November ====
- c. 1 Act anent the election of Robert, lord Burghlie to be preses of this meeting of estates in parliament. (19 November 1640)
- c. 2 Act anent the continouation of the parliament to the 14 Januarii 1641 yeires, with continouation of dayes. (19 November 1640)

=== 1641 ===
==== January ====
- c. 1 Act anent the election of Robert, lord Burghlie to be preses of this meeting of estates in parliamente. (14 January 1641)
- c. 2 Instrumentis upon production of the kingis lettir; protesation for the estats. (14 January 1641)
- c. 3 Act anent the continouatione of the parliament to the 13 day of Apryle 1641 yeires, with continouation of dayes. (14 January 1641)

==== April ====
- Act anent the election of Robert, lord Burghlie to be president of this meeting of estates in parliament.
- Instrumentes upon production of the kingis lettir and protestatione for the estates.
- Act anent the continuation of the parliament to the tuenty fyfte day of Maii 1641 yeires, with continuation of dayes.

==== May ====
- Act anent the electione of Robert, lord Burghlie to be president of this meeting of estates in parliament.
- Instrumentes upon production of the kingis lettir and protestation for the estates.
- Act anent the continouation of the parliament to the 15 Julii 1641 yeires, with continouation of dayes.

=== August ===
- Act anent the oath to be givine by everie member of parliamente. (18 August 1641)
- Act in favoures of Robert, lord Burghlie, anent his exoneratione of the chairge of precedencie in parliamente.
- Act anente the election of Johne, lord Ballmerino, to be president of this session of parliamente.
- Act and declaratione be the king in favoures of the memberes of parliamente.

=== 1646 ===
- Education Act 1646 (c. 46) Act for founding of schools in every parish. (2 February 1646)
- Act anent the payment of officiars, souldiors and dragouneris in thair quarteris, quantatie of ther pay and maner of payment therof. (19 November 1646)
- Act paroshes of Muckart and Dolor. (20 November 1646)
- Act Lord Balcarras. (31 December 1646)

== 1649 ==
- Act salvo jure cujuslibet. (16 March 1649)
- Act continueing the parliament whill the [twentie] thrid day of Maii nixtocome. (16 March 1649)

=== May ===
- Act nominating the erle of Loudoun, chancellor, presedent for this sessioun of parliament. (23 May 1649)
- Act for prorogating the dyat for visitatioun of the universitie of St Androis. (23 May 1649)
- Act continowing the commissionars for the excyse and accompts till fardor course.
- Act continuing the committies of war in the severall shyrs untill they be of new ellected.
- Act prorogating the service of Merioun Weir.

== See also ==
- List of legislation in the United Kingdom
- Records of the Parliaments of Scotland
