= List of acts of the New Zealand Parliament (1912–1928) =

This is a list of acts of the New Zealand Parliament for the period of the Reform Government of New Zealand up to and including part of the first year of the United Government of New Zealand.

== 1900s ==
=== 1912 ===
- Aged and Infirm Persons Protection Act Amended: 1957/69/75
- Akaroa and Wainui Road District, Akaroa County, and Wairewa County Alteration o Act
- Auckland Education Reserves Act
- Barmaids Registration Act
- Country Telephones-lines Act
- Deputy Governor's Powers Act
- Land Agents Act Amended: 1955/56/59/61
- Mokau Harbour Board Empowering Act
- New Plymouth Huatoki Stream Diversion and Exchange Act
- Oamaru King George's Park Reserve Vesting Act
- Plumbers Registration Act Amended: 1950/55
- Public Service Act Amended: 1927/46/50/51/52/54/59/60
- Tatum Trust Revocation Act
- Tauranga Harbour Act Amended: 1917
- Thomas George Macarthy Trust Act Amended: 1972
- Waimairi County Differential Rate Empowering Act
- Wellington and Karori Sanitation and Water-supply Act Amended: 1915
- Westland Hospital and Charitable Aid Board Vesting and Empowering Act
- Whakatane Harbour Act Amended: 1915/16/17/20/22/28/50

Plus 49 acts amended

=== 1913 ===
- Amendment Acts Incorporation 1913 Act
- Auckland City Empowering Act
- Board of Agriculture Act
- Christchurch Electrical Supply Empowering Act
- Church of England Trusts Act Amended: 1937/45/60
- City of Nelson Loans Conversion and Empowering Act Amended: 1916
- Footwear Regulation Act Amended: 1915
- Fruit-preserving Industry Act Amended: 1914/15
- Gisborne Borough and Harbour Board Lands Exchange and Empowering Act
- Hamilton High School Reserve Act
- Irrigation and Water-supply Act
- Kaitaia Land Drainage Act
- Labour Disputes Investigation Act
- McDougall Trust Estate Act
- Methodist Union Act
- New Zealand Institute of Architects Act Amended: 1919/21
- Old-age Pensions Reciprocity Act
- Rangiora Drill-shed Site Vesting Act
- Science and Art Act
- Springs County Council Reclamation and Empowering Act
- State Advances Act Amended: 1914/15/22/23
- Temporary Employees Act
- Wanganui Borough Council Special Rate Empowering and Special Loan Act
- Wanganui Borough Council Street Access Empowering Act Amended: 1916
- Wanganui Harbour District and Empowering Act Amended: 1923/26/29/35/37/54
- Western Taieri Land Drainage Board Enabling Act
- Westport Public Parks Vesting Act
- Whangarei Foreshore Vesting Act

Plus 53 acts amended

=== 1914 ===
- Auckland City and Auckland Harbour Board Empowering Act
- Christchurch Milk-supply and Markets Act Amended: 1917
- Dunedin City Council Empowering Act
- Education Act 1914
- Eltham Drainage Board Act
- Expeditionary Forces Voting Act
- Iron and Steel Industries Act Amended: 1920/25
- Local Railways Act Amended: 1915/20/26/88
- Mortgages Extension Act Amended: 1914/15/21
- Onehunga Borough Council Enabling Act
- Port Ahuriri-Westshore Road and Railway Act
- Railways Improvement Authorization Act Amended: 1915
- Regulation of Trade and Commerce Act Amended: 1915/17
- Remounts Encouragement Act
- Riccarton Bush Act Amended: 1947/49/64/72/79
- Southland Land Drainage Act Amended: 1938
- Takapuna Borough Foreshore Vesting Act
- Taumurunui Hospital District Act
- Trading with the Enemy Act Amended: 1915
- Waitara Harbour Board Empowering Act
- War Contributions Validation Act
- War Regulations Act Amended: 1915/16
- War Risk Insurance Act
- Whangarei Borough Land Vesting Act
- Whangarei Harbour Board Empowering Act

Plus 54 acts amended and one act repealed.

=== 1915 ===
- Alien Enemy Teachers Act
- Auckland City Markets and Empowering Act
- Bluff Harbour Improvements Act
- Cook Islands Act Amended: 1921/25/26/46/48/50/52/54/56/57/60/61/62/63/64/65/66/67/70/74/80/82/2007
- Cost of Living Act
- Devonport Borough Vesting Act
- Discharged Soldiers Settlement Act Amended: 1916/17/19/21/23/24
- Enemy Contracts Act
- Expeditionary Forces Act Amended: 1918
- Expiring Laws Continuance Act
- Georgetti Trust Estate Act
- Inglewood Borough Endowment Disposal Act
- Lake Coleridge Water-power Act
- Land Transfer Acts Compilation Act
- Lights on Vehicles Act
- Local Authorities Empowering Act
- Military Manoeuvres Act
- Miner's Phthisis Act
- National Registration Act
- Papakura Beach Vesting Act
- Prisoners Detention Act
- Public Expenditure Validation Act
- Suspension of Disqualification During War Act
- Swamp Drainage Act Amended: 1922/26/28/48/77
- Tauranga Borough Council and Tauranga Harbour Board Empowering Act
- Tauranga Foreshore Vesting and Endowment Act
- Tokomaru Bay Harbour Act
- War Funds Act Amended: 1918/24/27
- War Pensions Act Amended: 1916/17/23/35/36/40/45/46/47/49/50/51/55/57/58/60/61/62/63/64/65/66/67/68/69/70/71/72/73/74/75/76/77/78/79/80/81/82/83/86/88/90/91/96/2001/03/05/06

Plus 62 acts amended

=== 1916 ===
- Auckland City Parks Improvement and Empowering Act
- Christchurch Rating Agreements Enabling Act
- Cinematograph-film Censorship Act Amended: 1926
- Gisborne Borough Gas Act
- Invercargill Athenaeum Act
- Land and Income Tax Act Amended: 1920/22/24/25/26/27/29/30/31/32/33/35/36/39/40/41/44/45/46/49/50/51/52/53/54/55/56/57/58/59/60/61/62/63/64/65/66/67/68/69/70/71/72/73/74/75/76
- Military Service Act Amended: 1917/20
- New Zealand Insurance Company Trust Act
- Orchard-tax Act Amended: 1921/33/34
- Parliamentary Elections Postponement Act
- Waimakariri Harbour District and Empowering Act Amended: 1917/20/24
- Wairau Harbour Board Loan and Enabling Act
- Wellington Methodist Charitable and Educational Trusts Act Amended: 1974

Plus 13 acts amended

=== 1917 ===
- Day's Bay Sanitation and Water-supply Act
- Manawatu County Loan and Empowering Act Amended: 1919
- Napier Harbour Board Empowering and Vesting Act
- Nelson Harbour Board Empowering Act Amended: 1953
- New Zealand Inscribed Stock Act
- Registration of Aliens Act Amended: 1920
- Revocation of Naturalization Act Amended: 1920
- Sale of Liquor Restriction Act
- Social Hygiene Act
- State Supply of Electrical Energy Act Amended: 1956/57/58/59/60/61/64/65
- War Legislation Act Amended: 1916
- War Purposes Loan Act
- Wellington City Trading Departments' Reserve and Renewal Funds Act Amended: 1950
- Western Taieri Land Drainage Act
- Whangarei Harbour Board Vesting Act Amended: 1951

Plus 17 acts amended

=== 1918 ===
- Auckland Harbour Board, Devonport Borough Council, and Devonport Domain Board Act
- Auckland Institute and Museum Site Empowering Act
- Aviation Act
- Dunedin City Fish-markets and Empowering Act
- Electric-power Boards Act Amended: 1919/20/21/22/23/27/28/47
- Invercargill Borough Council Special Rate Empowering Act Amended: 1921
- John Donald Macfarlane Estate Administration Empowering Act
- Military Decorations and Distinctive Badges Act Amended: 1969/74
- Napier Harbour Board and Napier High School Empowering Act Amended: 1921
- Napier Harbour Board Loans Enabling Act
- New Plymouth Borough and Harbour Board Exchange Act
- Orari and Waihi Rivers Act
- Rangitata River Act
- Repatriation Act
- Thames Borough Boundaries Alteration Act
- Uawa County Act
- Whangarei Borough Empowering Act Amended: 1922

Plus 13 acts amended

=== 1919 ===
- Auckland University College Site Act
- Board of Trade Act Amended: 1923
- Charles Joseph Jury Estate Empowering Act
- Discharged Soldiers Settlement Loans Act
- Education Purposes Loans Act
- Electric-power Works Loan Act
- External Affairs Act Amended: 1920
- Fishing Industry Promotion Act
- Greytown Borough Loan Empowering Act
- Hauraki Plains, Thames, Ohinemuri, and Piako Counties Act
- Housing Act Amended: 1920/21/25/40/56/71/80/88/92
- Howard Estate Act Amended: 1926/27/85/88
- Inglewood County Act
- Manawatu Gorge Road and Bridge Act
- Matakaoa County Act
- Official Appointments and Documents Act
- Palmerston North Abattoir Act
- Statutes Repeal and Expiring Laws Continuance Act
- Tauranga Borough Council Electric Loans Empowering Act
- Tauranga Harbour Board Empowering Act Amended: 1921
- Tolaga Bay Harbour Act
- Treaties of Peace Act Amended: 1920
- Undesirable Immigrants Exclusion Act
- Victory Park Act
- Waimakariri Harbour Board Reserve Act
- Wellington City Abattoir Charges and Renewal Fund Act
- Wellington City Abattoir Loan Act
- Wellington Milk-supply Act
- Westport Technical School Site Act
- Whangarei Harbour Board Vesting and Empowering Act Amended: 1954
- Women's Parliamentary Rights Act

Plus 35 acts amended

== 1920s ==
=== 1920 ===
- Anzac Day Act Amended: 1921/96
- Bay of Islands Harbour Act Amended: 1922/30/36
- Dunedin City Corporation Empowering Act Amended: 1927/30/44
- Health Act Amended: 1940/47/51/54/58/59/60/61/62/67/70/71/72/73/75/76/78/79/80/82/87/88/93/94/98/2005/06
- Masseurs Registration Act Amended: 1924/35
- Native Trustee Act Amended: 1921/22/24/26/29
- Offenders Probation Act Amended: 1930
- Rotorua Town Lands Act Amended: 1977
- Statutes Drafting and Compilation Act Amended: 1973/88/95
- Taieri River Improvement Act Amended: 1921/32/39
- Te Aroha Crown Leases Act
- Thames Harbour Board Loan and Empowering Act Amended: 1923
- Wanganui Borough Council Empowering Act
- Wanganui Borough Council Empowering and Acquisition Act
- War Regulations Continuance Act
- Westport Harbour Act Amended: 1912/26/79

Plus 66 acts amended

=== 1921 ===
- Animals Protection and Game Act
- Auckland Electric-power Board Act Amended: 1924/26/37/38
- Companies Temporary Empowering Act
- Forests Act Amended: 1925/26/48/53/60/64/65/67/70/71/72/73/76/79/81/83/87/93/94/95/96/2004/05
- Geraldine County River District Act Amended: 1938
- Grey Collection Exchange Act
- Hunter Gift for the Settlement of Discharged Soldiers Act Amended: 1979
- Insurance Companies' Deposits Act Amended: 1922/50/58/71/72/74/77/82/83/2006
- Judea Land Drainage Board Empowering Act
- Loan Companies Act
- Local Bodies' Finance Act
- Meat-export Control Act Amended: 1924
- Mortgages and Deposits Extension Act
- Napier Harbour Board Enabling Act
- Palmerston North Borough Loans Consolidation Act
- Patents, Designs, and Trade-marks Act (On Wikidata)
- Public Expenditure Adjustment Act
- Samoa Act Amended: 1923/26/27/38/47/49/51/52/53/54/56/57/59
- Tauranga Borough Council Electric Loan Empowering Act
- Tolaga Bay Harbour Board Empowering Act
- Treaties of Peace Extension Act
- Urewera Lands Act
- Waikato and King-country Counties Act

Plus 49 acts amended

=== 1922 ===
- Administration of Justice Act
- Aid to Public Works and Land Settlements Act
- Amusements-tax Act Amended: 1923/24
- Auckland City and Auckland Hospital Board Empowering Act
- Christchurch Municipal Offices Leasing Act
- Fireblight Act
- Horouta District Licensing Poll Act
- Hutt River Improvement and Reclamation Act
- Main Highways Act Amended: 1925/26/27/28/36
- Paeroa Water-supply Transfer Validation Act
- Petone and Lower Hutt Gas-lighting Act Amended: 1926/27/33
- Rotorua Borough Act Amended: 1925
- Rural Credit Associations Act
- Scaffolding and Excavation Act Amended: 1924/48/51
- Sea Carriage of Goods Act Amended: 1962/68/85
- Thames Harbour Act
- Waimakariri River Improvement Act Amended: 1926/27/30/33/70/86
- Wairau Harbour Board Empowering Act
- Wairau River District Loans Act
- War Disabilities Removal Act
- Whangarei Borough Leasing Empowering Act

Plus 50 acts amended

=== 1923 ===
- Apprentices Act Amended: 1925/27/30/46/57/61/64/67/68/70/72/74/76/77
- Auckland Harbour Board and Takapuna Borough Council Empowering Act
- Baptist Union Incorporation Act Amended: 1970
- Companies Special Empowering Act
- Dairy-produce Export Control Act Amended: 1924/26
- Manawatu-Oroua River District Act Amended: 1925/29
- Masterton Trust Lands Trustees Empowering Act
- Registration of Aliens Suspension Act
- Rent Restriction Continuance Act
- St John's College Trust Act Amended: 1957
- Stamp Duties Act Postponement Act
- Wellington City Empowering and Special Rates Consolidation Act Amended: 1933

Plus 35 acts amended

=== 1924 ===
- Acts Interpretation Act Amended: 1908/20/60/62/73/79/83/86/88/94/96
- Auckland City Abattoir Act
- Auckland City and Auckland Museum Empowering Act
- Births and Deaths Registration Act Amended: 1912/15/20/30/47/53/55/59/61/63/64/69/70/72/76/82/91/93
- Companies Empowering Act Amended: 1931
- Dannevirke Hospital District Act
- Engineers Registration Act Amended: 1928/44/66/72/77/88/96
- Fruit Control Act Amended: 1932
- Hauraki Plains County Council Empowering Act
- Honey-export Control Act
- Mortgages Final Extension Act
- Motor-vehicles Act Amended: 1927/34/36
- New Plymouth Borough and New Plymouth Harbour Board Exchange Act
- New Plymouth Borough Council Empowering Act
- Opotiki Hospital District Act
- Poultry Act Amended: 1961/75
- Rangiora Borough Valuation of Farm Lands for Rating Purposes Act
- Rent Restriction Act
- Rhodes Memorial Convalescent Home Act
- Roman Catholic Bishop of Dunedin Empowering Act
- Seddon Family Burial-ground Act
- South Invercargill Borough Wards Validating Act
- Spiritualist Church of New Zealand Act
- Thomas Cawthron Trust Act Amended: 1966/76/81/85/93
- Wanganui City Council Special Rate Empowering and Enabling Act
- Wanganui City Council Vesting and Empowering Act Amended: 1942
- Wanganui-Rangitikei Electric-power Board Enabling Act
- Wellington City Mangahao Endowment Sale Empowering Act
- Whakatane Borough Empowering Act

Plus 45 acts amended

=== 1925 ===
- Ashley River Improvement Act Amended: 1927/37
- Brunner Borough Abolition Act
- Child Welfare Act Amended: 1927/48/54/58/60/61/64/65
- Deteriorated Lands Act
- District Courts Abolition Act
- Electrical Wiremen's Registration Act Amended: 1928/34
- Hutt Valley Lands Settlement Act Amended: 1926/27
- Kauri-gum Control Act
- Local Elections and Polls Act Amended: 1908/11/13/26/32/34/41/44/46/47/50/53/56/57/58/60/61/62/63/67/68/69/70/74/77/80/82/86/88/89/91/92/94
- Marine and Power Engineers' Institute Incorporation Act
- Massey Burial-ground Act Amended: 1981
- Matakaoa Hospital District Act
- Matamata County Council Empowering Act
- Mataura Borough Valuation of Farm Lands for Rating Purposes Act
- Napier Harbour Board Rating Regulation Act
- Nurses and Midwives Registration Act Amended: 1926/30/33/39/43/44
- Rawhiti Domain Act
- Repayment of the Public Debt Act
- Valuation of Land Act Amended: 1908/12/20/21/26/27/33/45/64/65/67/68/70/71/72/76/78/81/85/88/89/91/94
- Wanganui City Council Empowering and Enabling Act

Plus 29 acts amended

=== 1926 ===
- Auckland City Council Empowering Act
- Eastbourne Borough Bank Account and Empowering Act
- Family Allowances Act Amended: 1936
- Guardianship of Infants Act Amended: 1927/61
- Kaituna River District Act Amended: 1959/61
- Local Government Loans Board Act Amended: 1954
- Local Legislation Act
- Maori Arts and Crafts Act
- Mildred Elaine Smyth Divorce Act
- Motor-omnibus Traffic Act
- Napier Harbour Board and Napier Borough Enabling Act Amended: 1949
- New Zealand Agricultural College Act
- Oil in Territorial Waters Act
- Peel Forest Act Amended: 1927
- Petone Borough Council Empowering Act
- Reserves and other Lands Disposal Act
- Rural Advances Act
- Scientific and Industrial Research Act Amended: 1931/45/58/61/63/65/66/72/79/85/87/90
- Town-planning Act Amended: 1929/48
- Tutukaka, Whangaruru, and Whananaki Harbours Control Act
- Veterinary Surgeons Act Amended: 1964/92
- Whangarei County Council Empowering Act

Plus 56 acts amended

=== 1927 ===
- Dangerous Drugs Act Amended: 1928/60/63
- Fertilizers Act Amended: 1948
- Fungicides and Insecticides Act
- Greytown Trust Lands Trustees Empowering Act
- Introduction of Plants Act
- Lower Hutt Borough Council Empowering Act
- Makerua Drainage Board Loan Empowering Act
- Massey Agricultural College Act Amended: 1958
- Motor-spirits Taxation Act Amended: 1928
- Napier Foreshore Act
- Napier Harbour Board Loans Enabling Act 1918 Extension Act
- New Zealand Institute of Horticulture Act
- Newmarket Borough Council Vesting and Empowering Act
- Palmerston North Library Empowering Act
- Rural Intermediate Credit Act Amended: 1929/31/46/54/65/78
- Seeds Importation Act
- St Peter's Parish Endowment Fund Act
- Summer Time Act Amended: 1933
- Te Matai Road Water-race District Act
- Wellington City and Suburban Districts Ambulance Transport Service Act
- Wellington City and Suburban Water-supply Act Amended: 1929/30/35/47
- Wellington City Exhibition Grounds Act Amended: 1930
- Whakatane County Council Empowering and Loan-moneys Diversion Act

Plus 44 acts amended

=== 1928 ===
- Auckland Transport Board Act Amended: 1955/60/63
- Auckland War Memorial Museum Maintenance Act Amended: 1931/45/53/63/80
- Buller County Leasing Empowering Act
- Canterbury Provincial Buildings Vesting Act Amended: 1988
- Church of England Empowering Act Amended: 1966
- Cinematograph Films Act Amended: 1929/34/53/56/60/62/67/69/70/77/80
- Hanmer Crown Leases Act
- Hutt River Board Empowering Act
- Johnsonville and Makara Gas-supply Act
- London and New Zealand Bank, Limited Act
- Lyttelton Harbour Board Loan Enabling Act
- Methodist Theological College Edson Trust Extension Act
- Motueka Borough Council Library Act
- Music-teachers Registration Act
- Napier Borough and Napier Harbour Board Enabling Act
- Onerahi Water Reserve Enabling Act
- Opticians Act Amended: 1934/55/62/65/66
- Orchard and Garden Diseases Act Amended: 1914/20/40/50
- Papanui Memorial Hall Management Act
- Post and Telegraph Act Amended: 1910/11/13/15/19/20/22/24/27/33/36/44/47/48/53/56/57
- Public Reserves, Domains, and National Parks Act
- Statutory Land Charges Registration Act Amended: 1930/59/71/80
- Surveyors Registration Act
- Thames Borough Loans Rate Adjustment Act
- Timaru Borough Empowering Act
- Tumu-Kaituna Drainage Board Empowering Act
- Wairarapa Electric-power Board Empowering Act
- Whangarei Abattoir-site Extension Act

Plus 27 acts amended

== See also ==
The above list may not be current and will contain errors and omissions. For more accurate information try:

- Walter Monro Wilson, The Practical Statutes of New Zealand, Auckland: Wayte and Batger 1867
- The Knowledge Basket: Legislation NZ
- New Zealand Legislation Includes some imperial and provincial acts. Only includes acts currently in force, and as amended.
- Legislation Direct List of statutes from 2003 to order
