= Housing Act 1919 =

Housing Act 1919 can refer to:

- The Housing Act 1919, an act of the Parliament of New Zealand
- The Housing, Town Planning, &c. Act 1919, an act of the Parliament of the United Kingdom
