= Education Act 1901 (Renewal) Act 1902 =

Act of the Parliament of the United Kingdom

Education Act 1901 (Renewal) Act 1902 (Note: Section 2.)
- Act of Parliament
- Parliament of the United Kingdom
- Long title: An Act to renew the Education Act, 1901.
- Citation: 2 Edw. 7. c. 19
- Territorial extent: England and Wales (Note: Section 1.)

Dates
- Royal assent: 31 July 1902
- Commencement: 31 July 1902 (Note: The Acts of Parliament (Commencement) Act 1793.)
- Repealed
Other legislation
Amends	Education Act 1901
Repealed by	Education Act 1918

Status: Repealed

Text of statute as originally enacted

The Education Act 1901 (Renewal) Act 1902 (2 Edw. 7. c. 19) was an act of the Parliament of the United Kingdom.

It renewed the effects of the Education Act 1901 (1 Edw. 7. c. 11) for a further year.

== Subsequent developments ==
The whole act was repealed, having since become spent, by the Education Act 1918 (8 & 9 Geo. 5. c. 39), which came into force on.

== See also ==
- Education Act
