= Dominie =

Scottish schoolmaster

Dominie (Wiktionary definition) is a Scots language and Scottish English term for a Scottish schoolmaster usually of the Church of Scotland and also a term used in the US for a minister or pastor of the Dutch Reformed Church.

== Origin ==
It comes from the Latin domine (vocative case of Dominus 'Lord, Master'). When the Church of Scotland began to introduce universal provision of education in Scotland after it became established as a national church in 1560, its aim was to have a university-educated schoolmaster in every parish. The minister sometimes served as the dominie. Over time this came to be used as a term for a minister, schoolmaster or university student.

In the United States and in South Africa the same word is used to describe a pastor in the Dutch Reformed Church.

== See also ==
- Dominee
