= Education Act 1696 =

Act of the Parliament of Scotland

- Act of Parliament
- Parliament of Scotland
- Long title: Act for the Settling of Schools.
- Citation: 1696 c. 26 [12mo ed: c. 26]
- Territorial extent: Scotland

Dates
- Royal assent: 9 October 1696
- Repealed: 6 August 1872

Other legislation
- Repealed by: Education (Scotland) Act 1872

Status: Repealed

The Education Act 1696 (c. 26) was an act of the Parliament of Scotland that ordered locally funded, church-supervised schools to be established in every parish in Scotland. It was passed by the Parliament at Edinburgh on 8 September 1696 in the reign of Mary II and William II. The Act for Settling of Schools stated that for every parish without a school and paid schoolmaster

- a school will be founded and a schoolmaster appointed with the advice of the heritors and the parish minister.
- to this end, the heritors of every congregation will meet, and provide
  - a suitable house for the school.
  - an annual salary for the schoolmaster, between 100-200 merks.
  - a new tax on heritors and life-renters to pay for these.
  - for the tenants of heritors, they must pay half of the taxable amount on the land that they use to their heritors.
- if a majority of the heritors cannot agree, then any 5 members of the commissioners of supply are empowered to do it and assess the new tax.
- if the new tax is not paid, the debt is doubled, letters of horning are issued, and further actions will be taken; and if the tax is still not paid, the debt is repeatedly redoubled until it has been paid.
- if the Parliament passes a suspension of this act, it will be discussed summarily, without the usual Parliamentary formalities.
- life-renters owe the new tax on their rented land, just as if they owned the land.
- it is lawful for any person to petition the commissioners of supply, sheriff, or other judge competent for redress of any perceived inequality, if done within a year and a day.
- vacant stipends (money due or collected, but never spent) may be redirected towards realising this act, except regarding the synod of Argyll, where a 1690 act had already re-directed vacant stipends to this same purpose.
- the sheriff is empowered to apply vacant stipends towards the realisation of this act.
- except where they conflict with this act, no previous legal efforts for establishing and maintaining schools are changed.

The ongoing Episcopalian-Presbyterian power struggle had been decided, so school supervision henceforth would be by presbyteries (as per the Presbyterian view; the Episcopalian view was supervision by bishops). This act had the same purpose as similar acts in 1633 and 1646, and was in fact a repeat of the Education Act 1646, with little but the wording changed to reflect the more modern (i.e. 50 years later) times.

The act was effective in establishing schools and fostering education throughout the Protestant areas of Scotland, and would remain the basis for Scottish education until the reforms of 1872, although a later act, the Parochial Schools (Scotland) Act 1803 (43 Geo. 3. c. 54) would increase the schoolmaster's salary and modernise the language.

The act was not effective elsewhere, as it was used only as a tool in an effort to wipe out Gaelic (the obliteration of the Highlands language was a stated goal of the Act of Privy Council dated 10 December 1616). That government policy towards the Highlanders was not different at the time of this act is exemplified by the contemporary "Act and remit in favour of the synod of Argyll" of 12 July 1695, which authorised military action to collect assessments made for the "erecting of English schools for rooting out of the Irish language, and other pious uses".

== Subsequent developments ==
The whole act was repealed by section 78 of the Education (Scotland) Act 1872 (35 & 36 Vict. c. 62), which came into force on 6 August 1872.

== See also ==
- Education Act
- Education in Scotland
- Parliament of Scotland
- School Establishment Act 1616
- Education Act 1633
- Education Act 1646
