= Education Act 1496 =

Scottish legislation

- Act of Parliament
- Parliament of Scotland
- Long title: That all barronis and frehaldaris of substance put thair eldest sonis and airis to the sculis.
- Citation: 1496 c. 87 [12mo ed: c. 54]
- Territorial extent: Kingdom of Scotland

Dates
- Royal assent: 13 June 1496

Other legislation
- Repealed by: Statute Law Revision (Scotland) Act 1906

Status: Repealed

The Education Act 1496 (c. 87) was an act of the Parliament of Scotland that required landowners to send their eldest sons to school to study Latin, arts and law. This made schooling compulsory for the first time in the world.

The humanist intent was to ensure that local government lay in competent hands and to improve the administration of justice nationwide by making the legal system more responsive at the local level. The act states:

- all barons and substantial freeholders shall put their eldest sons and heirs into school from the age of 8 or 9.
- these shall remain in grammar schools under competent instruction until they have perfect Latin.
- They shall next spend three years at the schools of art and law.
- the purpose of this education is:
  - that they have knowledge and understanding of the laws, for the benefit of justice throughout the realm.
  - that those who become sheriffs or judges will have the knowledge to do justice.
  - to eliminate the need of the poor to seek redress from the king's principal auditors for each small injury (see Scottish Poor Laws).
- anyone who fails to do so without a lawful excuse shall pay the king the sum of £20 Scots.

The act was passed by the Parliament at Edinburgh on 13 June 1496 in the reign of James IV; in the 19th century, it remained in effect as one of the principal statutes for the management of schools under Scots law.

This act is sometimes referred to as the Education Act 1494; this is due to an error in some editions of the Acts of Parliament, where it is listed as 1494 James IV, c. 54.
