= Reformation of Manners =

English 17th-18th century ideological drive

The Reformation of Manners was an ideological drive to bring religious discipline to English parishes between the late 1600s and the early 1700s, and later in the 1780s with William Wilberforce as a major instigator. Following the sixteenth-century religious reformation in parts of England, Calvinism heavily influenced the governance of many parishes. These parishes were governed by a series of local presbyteries, a group of church elders that saw their duty in the regulation of morals in accordance with scriptural principles. Calvinist theology encouraged a dualistic distinction between the 'godly' and the 'reprobate' of the parish: it was thought that the 'better sort' of inhabitant should be responsible for policing and disciplining the behaviour of their 'vulgar' neighbours. In practice, the 'word of God' was brought to bear on communities through pastoral supervision, an enforced focus on scriptural education (see Free Grammar School)), attempts to increase literacy, mandatory repetition of catechisms and the suppression of many popular pastimes, including parish wakes, seasonal festivities, drinking and bear-baiting. This impulse is perhaps best exemplified in Richard Baxter's ministry over Kidderminster in Worcestershire between 1641 and 1660. Baxter, often referred to as 'the saint of the Puritans', had an exalted view of his ministerial office and pastoral duties, striving to bring moral discipline to his parishioners. Baxter's ministry is an extreme example but the Reformation of Manners was also manifested as a wider initiative in the church courts throughout England more generally. The seventeenth and eighteenth centuries, particularly, saw these courts take a leading role in enforcing the moral principles of the Anglican Church.

== The Second Reformation ==
William Wilberforce was the instigator of the Second Reformation of Manners which began in 1787. While researching for a Bill he was going to introduce in Parliament, he became concerned at the large number of death sentences carried out in England at that time. Believing that if people were punished for small crimes,(such as swearing, gambling, or 'lewdness'), they would be less likely to drift into more serious crimes such as murder, he approached King George III. The King responded by issuing a Royal Proclamation in June 1787 urging people of honor and authority to set good examples, purposed to "discount and punish all manner of vice, profaneness, and immorality, in all persons, of whatsoever degree or quality, within this our realm," prohibited gambling on the Lord's Day, declared that all people should attend church, that all persons who drank in excess, blasphemed, swore, cursed, were lewd or profaned the Lord's Day should be prosecuted, ordered that public gambling, disorderly houses. unlicensed places of entertainment, and publishers and vendors of loose and licentious books should be suppressed, and that the rules against commerce on Sunday should be enforced. Wilberforce started the "Society for the Reformation of Manners" also called the Proclamation Society the same year, its members committed to uphold the King's edict. 10 years later, he wrote a book, called A Practical View, which was a call to people to return to the Christian faith.
