= School Establishment Act 1616 =

Act of the Scottish Privy Council

The School Establishment Act 1616 was an Act of the Scottish Privy Council dated 10 December 1616. It mandated the establishment of publicly funded, Church-supervised schools in every parish of Scotland. The act was a consequence of the Scottish Reformation, and was the basis of all future acts of the Parliament of Scotland related to school establishment.

== Summary ==
The act stated:

- the king (James VI) has a special care and regard that:
  - Protestantism be everywhere fostered and promoted.
  - everyone, especially the youth, be educated in civility, godliness, knowledge, and learning.
  - 'Inglis' be universally established, and Gaelic be obliterated because it is a main cause for the barbarity and incivility of the people of the Isles and Highlands.
- therefore a school will be established in every parish, based on the resources of the parish, and such that:
  - it will be paid for by the parishioners.
  - it will be supervised by Church bishops.
  - letters will be published so that none can claim ignorance of these requirements.

The act reflected the current status of the ongoing Episcopalian-Presbyterian power struggle by specifying school supervision by bishops (as per the Episcopalian view; the Presbyterian view was supervision by presbyteries).

For the most part, the act was inspired by adherence to the principles of Knox's Book of Discipline. The objective that everyone, especially the youth, be educated is taken from the Preamble to the book, while the means of realising this objective (government establishment of Church-supervised schools) is also from that book.

Those who were sympathetic towards Highland culture praised the objective of promoting universally available education, but noted that government efforts in the Isles and Highlands were anti-Gaelic and not pro-education.

By itself, the act was not effective, as it provided no means of realisation. The act would be ratified by the Parliament's Education Act 1633, which would also provide a method of realising the objective. The privy council act remained in effect into the nineteenth century as one of the principal statutes for the management of schools under Scots Law.

== See also ==
- Education Act 1633
- Education Act 1646
- Education Act 1696
- Education in Scotland
