= Education Act 1633 =

Act of the pre-Union Parliament of Scotland

- Act of Parliament
- Parliament of Scotland
- Long title: Ratification of the act of council regarding plantation of schools.
- Citation: 1633 c. 5 [12mo ed: c. 5]

Dates
- Royal assent: 18 June 1633

The Education Act 1633 (c. 5) was an act of the Parliament of Scotland that ordered a locally funded, Church-supervised school to be established in every parish in Scotland, and included the means to realise that order. The act was passed by the Parliament at Edinburgh on 18 June 1633, titled "Ratification of the act of council regarding plantation of schools". It stated:

- with the advice of Parliament, the king (Charles I) ratifies the Act of Privy Council dated 10 December 1616 at Edinburgh, made regarding the establishment of schools.
- in addition:
  - bishops have the power to assess land for taxation purposes, for the establishment and maintenance of the schools, with the consent of the landowners, and with the consent of most of the parishioners.
  - should a landowner refuse to appear so that he might give consent, then it will be with the consent of most of the parishioners only.
  - any person may petition the Privy Council for redress of any grievances concerning this tax.
  - a formal notice must be provided to landowners, notifying them of the time to appear (in order that they might give their consent).

This act reflected the current status of the ongoing Episcopalian-Presbyterian power struggle by specifying school supervision by bishops (as per the Episcopalian view; the Presbyterian view was supervision by presbyteries).

The act was less successful than it might have been in that it required the consent of local parishioners, which was not always obtained. The loophole was closed by the Education Act 1646.

== See also ==
- Education in Scotland
- Parliament of Scotland
- School Establishment Act 1616
- Education Act 1646
- Education Act 1696
