= Education Act 1646 =

Act of the pre-Union Parliament of Scotland

- Act of Parliament
- Parliament of Scotland
- Long title: Act for founding of schools in every parish.
- Citation: 1646 c. 46

Dates
- Royal assent: 2 February 1646

Other legislation
- Repealed by: Rescissory Act 1661

Status: Rescinded

The Education Act 1646 (c. 46) was an act of the Parliament of Scotland that ordered locally funded, Church-supervised schools to be established in every parish in Scotland. It was passed by the Parliament at St. Andrews on 2 February 1646 in the reign of Charles I, titled "Act for founding of schools in every parish."

The act stated that for every parish without a school and paid schoolmaster:

- a school will be founded and a schoolmaster appointed with the advice of the presbytery.
- to this end, the heritors of every congregation will meet and provide:
  - a suitable house for the school.
  - an annual stipend for the schoolmaster, between 100-200 merks.
  - a new tax on land and outdoor property to pay for these.
- if the heritors do not do this, a panel of 12 men will be appointed by the presbytery, and the panel is empowered to do it and assess the new tax.
- if the new tax is not paid, the debt is doubled, letters of horning are issued, and further actions will be taken; and if the tax is still not paid, the debt is repeatedly redoubled until it has been paid.
- life-renters owe the new tax on their rented land, just as if they were heritors.
- it is lawful for any person to petition the Privy Council for redress of any perceived inequality, if done within a year and a day.

The act reflected the current status of the ongoing Episcopalian-Presbyterian power struggle by specifying school supervision by presbyteries (the Presbyterian view; the Episcopalian view was supervision by bishops).

This act had the same purpose as the Education Act 1633, which had been only partially successful because it had required the consent of those paying the tax, or of members of the congregation. That consent was not always given, but this act allowed the presbytery to ensure that it was done, and placed stiff penalties on those who did not comply. However, this act (of 1646) was passed amidst the tumult of the civil wars, and was rescinded in 1661 when the political winds shifted with the Restoration, so it never had the opportunity to become effective. It would be passed again 50 years later (Education Act 1696), with little changed but the use of more modern (i.e. 50 years later) wording.

== See also ==
- Education in Scotland
- Parliament of Scotland
- School Establishment Act 1616
- Education Act 1633
- Education Act 1696
