= Heritor =

Privileged person in a parish under Scots law

A heritor was a privileged person in a parish in Scots law. In its original acceptation, it signified the proprietor of a heritable subject, but, in the law relating to parish government, the term was confined to such proprietors of lands or houses as were liable, as written in their title deeds, for the payment of public burdens, such as the minister's stipend, manse and glebe assessments, schoolmaster's salary, poor rates, rogue-money (for preventing crime) as well as road and bridge assessments, and others like public and county burdens or, more generally, cess, a land tax. A liferenter might be liable to cess and so be entitled to vote as an heritor in the appointment of the minister, schoolmaster, etc. The occasional female landholder so liable was known as a heritrix.

In Scotland the term heritor was used to denote the feudal landholders of a parish until the early 20th century. For example, in the early 20th century the heritors of the Highland Parish of Crathie and Braemar were the estates of Mar Lodge, Invercauld, Balmoral, and Abergeldie.

Historically, land-holding in Scotland is feudal in nature, meaning that all land is technically "owned" by the Crown, which, centuries ago, gave it out – feued it – to various tenants-in-chief in return for specified services or obligations. These obligations became largely financial in time, or ceremonial or at least notional. Similarly, these tenants-in-chief gave parcels of land out to lesser "owners", and the resulting reciprocal obligations too became financial – feudal dues – or notional. Often, though, conditions were imposed by the feudal superior at the time of the transaction – used in the 19th century as a form of planning control. (Note: Most financial obligations were abolished in Scotland in 1974.)

The result was that "landowners" had differing rights to the land they "owned". However, those who held their land without limit of time – that is, only had a ceremonial or ancient financial obligation towards their notional "superiors" – were distinguished from others and were called heritors. In effect, they were the gentry of the Scots countryside, with legal privileges and obligations. Most ordinary farmers rented their land for a specific period of time from the heritors.

Like the gentry in other countries, the heritors ruled the countryside. They were responsible for justice, law and order in their district and for keeping the roads in good repair. They were responsible for appointing – and paying – the minister and the schoolmaster, and for maintaining the church, manse and schoolhouse. They had also to provide for the poor of their parish. For all this they levied a rate on all the heritors in the parish – and often included non-heritor tenant farmers in the rate.

== Sources ==
- Sinclair, Prof. J.M (1991), Collins English Dictionary, HarperCollins, Glasgow
- Text of the Heritor as in force today (including any amendments) within the United Kingdom, from legislation.gov.uk.
- Text of the Heritor as in force today (including any amendments) within the United Kingdom, from legislation.gov.uk.
- Bell, William (revised by Ross, G) A Dictionary and Digest of the Law of Scotland, with short explanations of the most ordinary English law terms ' Bell & Bradfute, Edinburgh, 1861
