= List of Melbourne High School alumni =

This is a List of Melbourne High School alumni who are notable former students – known as "Old Boys" of the public selective school, the Melbourne High School in South Yarra, Victoria, Australia.

In 2001, The Sun-Herald ranked Melbourne High School third in Australia's top ten boys' schools, based on the number of its alumni mentioned in the Who's Who in Australia (a listing of notable Australians).

== Academic ==
- Frederick Alexander – historian
- George Keith Batchelor – applied mathematician and fluid dynamicist, founder of the Journal of Fluid Mechanics
- Noel Bayliss, CBE – chemist
- Michael Birt, AO, CBE – biochemist, Vice-Chancellor of the University of Wollongong (1975–1980), Vice-Chancellor of the University of New South Wales (1981–1992)
- Warner Max Corden – economist
- Kevin Donnelly – educator and Senior Research Fellow, Australian Catholic University
- Ian Gust, AO – researcher on microbiology and immunology, former research and development director for CSL Limited
- Brigadier George Furner Langley
- Leslie H. Martin – physicist
- Rupert Myers – metallurgist, academic and university administrator
- Professor Gareth W. Peters – Duncan Endowed Chair Professor in Actuarial Science, Department of Statistics and Applied Probability, University of California, Santa Barbara
- Major-General Alan Ramsay – Director of Education
- J. Hyam Rubinstein – professor of Mathematics at the University of Melbourne
- John Tasioulas – Director of Institute for Ethics in AI and Professor of Ethics and Legal Philosophy at University of Oxford, first Greek-Australian Rhodes Scholar
- Frank T. M. White – Foundation Professor, Mining and Metallurgical Engineering, University of Queensland; Macdonald Professor of Mining Engineering and Applied Geophysics, McGill University

== Business ==
- Ray Evans — businessman
- Lindsay Fox AC – billionaire CEO and Founder of trucking company Linfox and the seventeenth richest Australian in the 2011 BRW Rich 200
- John Gandel – billionaire businessman and the ninth richest Australian in the 2011 BRW Rich 200
- Michael Gudinski – entrepreneur, businessman, founder of Mushroom Records
- Peter Ivany – entrepreneur, former CEO of Hoyts
- Ruslan Kogan – founder and CEO of Kogan Technologies
- Geoff Lord – founder and CEO of Belgravia Group
- Ian MacFarlane – former Governor of the Reserve Bank of Australia
- David Morgan – former Westpac CEO

== Entertainment, media and the arts ==
- Graeme Base – author and artist
- Andrew Bergen – journalist, photographer, musician, record label manager and DJ
- Leigh Bowery – fashion designer
- Thanh Bui – Australian Idol contestant, Season 6, 2008, 8th place
- Akshat Chopra – founder and President of Germanic Languages Club
- John Diedrich – actor, director, producer and singer
- George Dreyfus – composer
- Jon Faine – ABC broadcaster
- Raimond Gaita – philosopher, author of memoir Romulus, my Father
- Michael Gawenda – journalist, editor
- Dean Geyer – Australian Idol contestant, Season 4, 2006, 3rd place
- Max Gillies AM – political satirist
- Harry Gordon – journalist and Olympic historian
- Athol Guy – member of Australian folk band The Seekers
- Keith Potger – member of Australian folk band The Seekers
- Bruce Woodley – member of Australian folk band The Seekers
- Nazeem Hussain – comedian
- Greg Hywood – journalist, editor, CEO of Fairfax Media
- Graham Kennedy – television personality
- Nick McKenzie – investigative journalist
- George Megalogenis – journalist
- Imre Salusinszky – columnist for The Australian and Chair of the Australia Council
- Peter Starkie – member of Australian rock group Skyhooks
- Peter Tregear – OAM, conductor, author
- Jonathon Welch – opera singer, conductor and founder of The Choir of Hard Knocks

== Medicine and science ==
- Noel Bayliss CBE – chemist
- Eric Burhop FRS – physicist and humanitarian
- John Eccles AC, FRS – Nobel Prize winner for Medicine
- Ian Gust AO – researcher on microbiology and immunology, former research and development director for CSL Limited
- Jeffrey Rosenfeld AC, OBE – neurosurgeon
- Brett Sutton – former Victorian Chief Health Officer

== Military ==
- Frank Horton Berryman – Australian Army general and Royal Military College, Duntroon, graduate
- Brigadier George Furner Langley
- Major-General Alan Ramsay – Director of Education
- Keith Truscott – Commanding Officer No. 76 Squadron RAAF, World War II fighter ace and Melbourne AFL player (after whom the club's annual Best and Fairest award is named)
- Air Vice Marshal Henry Wrigley – founding member of the RAAF
- Lieutenant General Greg Bilton AO CSC – Chief of Joint Operations, from July 2019 to July 2024.

== Politics, public service and the law ==
- Maurice Ashkanasy – Barrister and former Chairman of the Victorian Bar Council
- Ryan Batchelor - Member of Victorian Legislative Council
- Alan Bird – MHR (ALP) for Division of Batman (1949–1962)
- Daniel Bowen – President of the Public Transport Users Association
- Alex Chernov AO QC – Justice of the Supreme Court; Chancellor of the University of Melbourne; Governor of the State of Victoria
- Frank Crean – MHR (ALP), Deputy Prime Minister, Minister for Overseas Trade
- Simon Crean – MHR (ALP), Federal Opposition leader, Minister for Trade
- Bill Cutts – diplomat
- Rae Else-Mitchell – judge of the New South Wales Supreme Court and legal scholar
- Gareth Evans AC QC – Chancellor of Australian National University, Senator (ALP), MHR; Foreign Minister; Barrister
- John Galbally CBE QC, MHR (ALP) – Barrister
- Petro Georgiou AO MHR Liberal
- Brian Howe AO MHR (ALP) – Deputy Prime Minister
- Barry Jones AO MHR (ALP) (1977–1998) – former Minister for Science
- Joseph Kay AM – Former judge of the appeal division of the Family Court of Australia
- Isi Leibler – Jewish Community Leader and Businessman
- Ron Merkel QC – Former Justice of the Federal Court of Australia; Recipient of the Human Rights Medal
- Alan Missen – Federal Liberal Party Senator for Victoria (1974–1986)
- Robert Redlich – Justice of the Court of Appeal, Supreme Court of Victoria
- Bruce Ruxton AM OBE – President of the Victorian RSL
- Alan Stockdale – former Victorian MLA, (Lib), Victorian Treasurer, Macquarie Banker
- J. B. Webb – Influential in shaping Australia's international relations and aid during the 1950s, '60s and '70s
- Mark Weinberg – Justice of the Court of Appeal, Supreme Court of Victoria
- Jim Wilkinson (Australian politician) – Member of the Tasmanian Legislative Council, President of the Tasmanian Legislative Council. Also played football for South Melbourne in the VFL and first class cricket for Tamania, sports commentator and administrator, and lawyer

== Religion ==
- Raymond Apple – leading Australian rabbi

== Sport ==
Australian Football League – Members of the AFL Hall of Fame

- Brian Dixon – Melbourne Football Club
- Tom Hafey – Richmond Football Club
- Neil Roberts – St Kilda Football Club
- Dale Weightman – Richmond Football Club
- Gordon Roy Wright – Richmond Football Club

Australian Football League – Members of the Team of the Century for each AFL club

- Brian Dixon – Melbourne Football Club, wing
- Tom Hafey – Richmond Football Club, coach
- Matthew Knights – Richmond Football Club, interchange bench
- Garry Lyon – Melbourne Football Club, half-forward flank
- Billy Picken – Collingwood Football Club, half-back flank
- Neil Roberts – St Kilda Football Club, centre-half back
- Dale Weightman – Richmond Football Club, forward pocket
- Gordon Roy Wright – Richmond Football Club, ruckman

Australian Football League (players)
Collingwood Football Club

- Graeme Anderson
- Rupert Betheras
- Allan Davis
- Rene Kink – 7th in the Brownlow Medal count 1979
- Phil Manassa – after whom the AFL Goal-of-the-Year award is named
- Rod Oborne
- Billy Picken – Best and Fairest 1978 and 1983, 3rd in the Brownlow Medal count 1977

Essendon Football Club

- Allan Davis
- Rene Kink
- Stephen Taubert
- Bryan Wood – Member 1985 Premiership team

Hawthorn Football Club

- Cameron Bruce
- David Parkin – Captain 1971 premiership team, Best and Fairest 1965

Melbourne Football Club

- Cameron Bruce – Co-captain 2008, Best and Fairest 2008
- Allan Davis
- Ross Dillon – Leading goalkicker 1969 and 1970
- Brian Dixon – Member of 5 premiership teams, Best and Fairest 1960, Tassie Medal 1961, All-Australian 1961
- Dick Fenton-Smith – Two-time premiership player
- Robert Flower – Best and Fairest 1977, Harold Ball Memorial Trophy 1973
- Andy Lovell – Runner-up Best and Fairest 1992, Harold Ball Memorial Trophy
- Glenn Lovett – Best and Fairest 1992
- Garry Lyon – Captain 1991–97, Best and Fairest 1990, 1994, All-Australian 1993–95
- David Schwarz – Vice-Captain 2000, Best and Fairest 1999
- Stephen Tingay – Runner-up Best and Fairest 1994, All-Australian 1994

North Melbourne Football Club

- Will Walker – Midfielder

Richmond Football Club

- Matthew Knights – Captain 1997–2000, Best and Fairest 1990 & 1992, Runner-up for the Brownlow medal 1995
- Mark Lee – Member of 1980 Premiership team, Captain 1985–86, Best and Fairest 1984, All-Australian 1980, 1983, 1985
- Stephen Ryan – Member of 1989 Under 19s Premiership team, Leading goalkicker 1990
- Stephen Taubert
- Dale Weightman – Member 1980 Premiership team, Captain 1988–92, Best and Fairest 1986–87, Tassie Medal 1985, All-Australian 1985–86, 1988
- Bryan Wood – Member 1973, 1974 and 1980 Premiership teams, Captain 1981
- Gordon Roy Wright – Captain 1958–59, Best and Fairest 1951–52, 1954, 1957, All-Australian 1956

Sydney Football Club

- Billy Picken
- Stephen Taubert - 4th in the Brownlow Medal count 1984

St Kilda Football Club

- Allan Davis
- Lindsay Fox AC
- David Grant – Runner-up Best and Fairest 1989, All Australian 1991
- Rene Kink
- Keith Ross Miller MBE – Also a champion Test cricketer
- Neil Roberts – Captain 1959–62, Best and Fairest 1955 & 1958, All-Australian 1958
- John Stephens – Leading goalkicker 1972
- Spencer White

West Coast Eagles

- Andy Lovell

Australian Football League (Brownlow medalists)

- Neil Roberts – St Kilda Football Club 1958
- Gordon Roy Wright – Richmond Football Club 1952 & 1954

Australian Football League (coaches)

- Tom Hafey – Richmond Football Club, Collingwood Football Club, Geelong Football Club, Sydney Football Club
- Matthew Knights – Essendon Football Club
- David Parkin – Hawthorn Football Club (premiers 1978), Carlton Football Club (premiers 1981–82 and 1995), and Fitzroy Football Club.

Australian Football League (administrators)

- Lindsay Fox AC – President of the St Kilda Football Club

Australian Football League (television personalities)

- Garry Lyon – Nine Network
- David Schwarz – Seven Network

Cricket

- Keith Miller MBE – Test cricketer, former VFL player
- Doug Ring – Test cricketer
- Jack Wilson – Test cricketer
- William Maldon Woodfull – Australian Test cricket captain, he returned to the school as a mathematics teacher and became principal.

National Basketball League

- Andrew Parkinson – NBL player

National Football League

- Jordan Berry – NFL punter, Pittsburgh Steelers

Olympians

- Rhydian Cowley – Olympian, race walker, 2024 Marathon Racewalk Mixed Relay Bronze Medal
- Ron Clarke – Olympian, former holder of 17 world records for long-distance running, philanthropist and Mayor of the Gold Coast
- Ralph Doubell – Olympian, athlete, 1968 800m Gold Medal
- Steve Foley – Olympian, diver
- Nick Green – Olympian, member of the Oarsome Foursome
- Peter Lloyd – Olympian, gymnastics
- Kyle Swan – Olympian, race walker
- Graham White – Olympian, swimmer, 1968 4x200m freestyle relay Silver Medal
- Peter Winter – Olympian, athlete

== See also ==
- List of non-government schools in Victoria
