= Ruby Gainfort =

Australian headmistress (1890–1985)

- Born: Rubina Hope Gainfort; 7 April 1890; Clifton Hill, Victoria, Australia
- Died: 22 November 1985 (aged 95); Camberwell, Victoria, Australia
- Employer: Mac.Robertson Girls' High School
- Predecessor: Mary Hutton

Rubina Hope "Ruby" Gainfort (7 April 1890 – 22 November 1985) was an Australian headmistress known as head of Melbourne's Mac.Robertson Girls' High School.

== Life ==
Gainfort was born in Clifton Hill in 1890. Her parents were Sarah (born Cordy) and her Irish immigrant husband Edward Gainfort. Her father whose profession was "gentleman" died in 1901. Gainfort and her sister went to the same school and Ruby was one of the founding pupils of Melbourne Continuation School. Ruby went on to Melbourne Teachers' College where she showed expertise in mathematics. She was a qualified teacher in 1912 and she studied further at the University of Melbourne in her spare time.

In 1912 she was the head of Kyabram school.

She joined the Emily McPherson College of Domestic Economy where she was promoted to acting principal during the second world war.

In 1946 Gainfort became the vice-Principal of Mac.Robertson Girls' High School when Mary Hutton, the Principal, retired in 1948. Hutton was only recognised as a Principal in 1945, because she was a woman and she was underpaid compared with her male peers.

Gainfort took over the school in 1949 when there were 700 students on the role. For the next six years Hutton was still employed as a part-time teacher.

Gainfort encouraged a more relaxed atmosphere and it was said she knew each of the school's pupils by name. She retired in 1955 having modernised the curriculum and increased pupils' participation in learning.

Gainfort died in Camberwell in 1985.
