= Mac.Robertson Girls' High School =

Secondary school in Australia

The Mac.Robertson Girls' High School

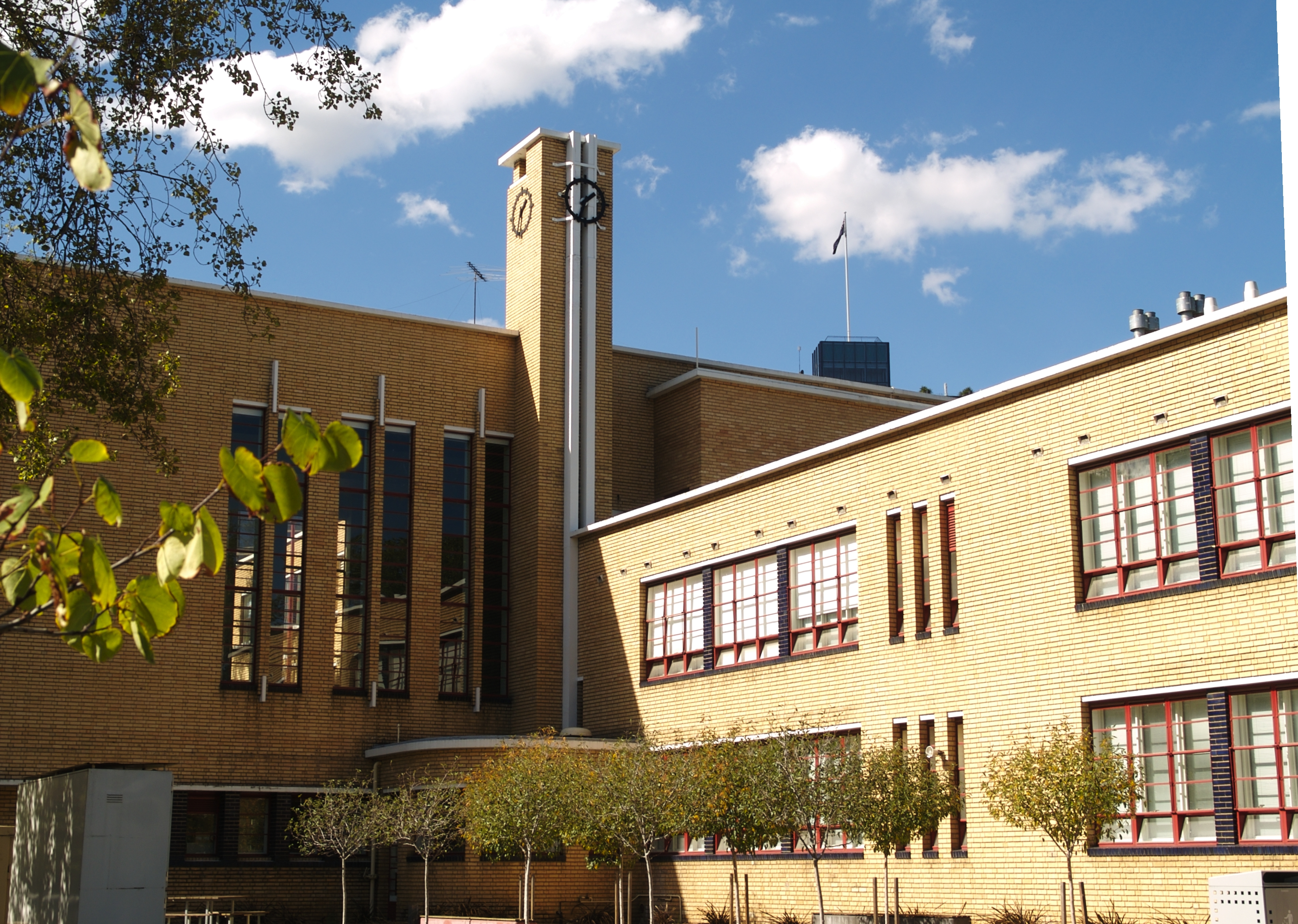

Location
- South Melbourne, Victoria; Australia; 37°50′11″S 144°58′16″E

Information
- Type: Government-funded single-sex selective secondary day school
- Motto: Latin: Potens Sui (Mastery of self)
- Established: 1934; 92 years ago
- Oversight: Victoria Department of Education
- Principal: Sue Harrap
- Years: 9–12
- Enrolment: 1150 (2022)
- Campus: Suburban
- Colours: Maroon, green, and charcoal
- Nickname: Mac.Rob; MGHS
- Brother school: Melbourne High School
- Website: www.macrob.vic.edu.au

The Mac.Robertson Girls' High School (also known simply as Mac.Rob or MGHS) is a government-funded single-sex academically selective secondary day school, in Albert Park, Victoria, Australia. Entry for Mac.Rob, which is operated by the Victorian Department of Education, is by competitive academic examination. It is unique in its status as a statewide provider for girls in Year 9 to Year 12. The equivalent for boys is its brother school, Melbourne High School. Each year, up to 8,000 candidates sit for the entrance examination for a total of approximately 960 places available in the four selective entry high schools in Victoria.

== Overview ==
In 2001, The Sun-Herald ranked The Mac.Robertson Girls' High School sixth in Australia's top ten girls' schools, based on the number of its alumnae mentioned in the Who's Who in Australia.^{[a]} The Mac.Robertson Girls' High School has a long tradition of academic excellence with Victorian Certificate of Education (VCE) scores propelling the school to be ranked first in the State of Victoria for seven consecutive years from 2002 to 2008, inclusive. The school was ranked third in 2009, but reclaimed its No. 1 ranking once again in 2010, 2011, 2013 and 2018. The Mac.Robertson Girls' High School was ranked second out of all state secondary schools in Victoria based on VCE results in 2018.

== History ==
The Mac.Robertson Girls' High School began as the girls' section of Melbourne Continuation School, the first government funded secondary school in Victoria. It was established in 1905 in Spring Street, Melbourne and in 1912 it was renamed Melbourne High School.

By 1920, the Spring Street building was in poor condition and the Department of Education decided to split the school into two single-sex schools. In 1928, the boys moved to a new building in South Yarra, and the girls remained at Spring Street. The new schools were named Melbourne Boys' High School and Melbourne Girls' High School.

Girls continued to be educated at Spring Street under the leadership of headmistress Christina Montgomery who had led the girls since 1923. In 1930, the school was housed in the then-vacant Government House until 1933, when they moved to State School No. 1689 in King Street. Sybil Llewelyn was appointed as head in 1933, but she soon resigned due to illness,

In 1934, with the help of a donation from Macpherson Robertson, a new building was constructed in the north-east corner of Albert Park Reserve. The school opened as the Mac.Robertson Girls' High School on 7 November 1934. The new head in 1934 was Mary Hutton. The school was used as United States Army Headquarters in 1942 and later by the Royal Australian Air Force. The students took their classes at Brighton Road State School, Camberwell East Girls' School, and University High School during this period. Hutton reassembled the school in 1943 and despite the military take-over, the school's reputation increased.

Hutton led the school until 1948. She was always assessed as a high performer, but was paid less than her male peers even after she was finally recognised as a Principal in 1945. She led the school until 1948. When Ruby Gainfort, who had been Vice-Principal, took over in 1949, there were 700 students in the school. For the next six years, Hutton was still employed as a part-time teacher. Gainfort encouraged a more relaxed atmosphere and was said to know each of the pupils by name. She retired in 1955, having modernised the curriculum and increased pupils' participation in learning.

The building was gazetted as an Historic Building in 1982 and gained a National Trust classification in 1987. The school celebrated its centenary year in 2005, along with Melbourne High School, in a joined assembly. Mac.Rob celebrated by inviting Premier of Victoria Steve Bracks to witness the restarting of the school clock tower (which did not in fact start when the time came).

== Past principals ==
Period	Principal	Refs.
1927–1932	Christina Montgomery	
1933	Sybil Llewelyn	
1934–1948	Mary Hutton	
1949–1955	Rubina Gainfort	
1955–1965	Daphne Barrett	
1966–1971	Nina Carr	
1972–1984	Gwen Bowles	
1985–1996	Gabrielle Blood	
1996–2004	Lesley Boston	
2004–2012	Jane Garvey	
2013–2018	Toni Meath	
2019–2021	Anne Stout	
2021–present	Sue Harrap	

== Enrolment and structure ==
The middle school caters for students in years 9 and 10, whilst the senior school caters for students in years 11 and 12. The school's enrolment is approximately 950 to 980 students every year. Prior to 2019, 225 students were admitted into year 9, with an extra class of 25 added in year 10. In 2019, the number of students in year 9 was changed to 250, with only a small number of students added in year 10 to bring the cohort back to 250 students. In 2020, a quota of 300 year 9 students were selected for enrolment every year through the year 8 entrance examination. The size of the year 10-12 cohorts vary between 230 and 260 students each year.

=== Subjects ===
In Year 9, students take core subjects including Mathematics, Foreign Language, English, Science, Physical Education and School Singing. Students with Geography and History alternating per semester. Students are also required to take two electives.

Year 10 students take Mathematics, Foreign Language, and choose an English elective, PE elective, Humanities elective, Science elective, Arts/Technology elective and/or an uncatergorised elective. Many electives are also available as VCE Units 1&2 subjects. Students must also continue education of a foreign language either in school or as an external subject. If a student chooses to learn language externally, they must choose an extra elective to study at school.

Year 11 students study VCE. Students are required to take six year-long VCE/VET subjects, that may consist of maximum two VCE Units 3&4 subjects.

Year 12 students typically study four to six VCE Units 3&4 subjects. Students usually cannot study more than a total of six VCE Units 3&4 subjects across their VCE journey.

== Houses ==
The four houses and their associated colours are:

- Naiads, river nymphs (blue)
- Dryads, tree nymphs (green)
- Nereids, sea nymphs (white)
- Oreads, mountain nymphs (red)

Nereids' official colour is white, although throughout the years it has come to adopt purple as its secondary colour.

== Notable alumni ==
Notable alumnae from the school include:

- Alexandra Adornetto, author
- Ellen Balaam, physician and first female surgeon in Victoria
- Judith Buckrich, academic and author
- Beatrice Faust (née Fennessy), author and feminist activist
- Alice Garner, actress and academic
- Antoinette Halloran, opera singer
- Amirah Inglis, author
- Rosea Kemp (née Boyd) - meteorologist
- Tan Le, Young Australian of the Year
- Seen Lee, weightlifter
- Veronika Megler, computer scientist, data scientist and game developer
- Katharine Parton, composer & first female Director of Music, Fitzwilliam College Cambridge
- Alice Pung, author
- Priya Serrao, lawyer and Miss Universe Australia 2019
- Dorothy Shineberg, historian
- Christina Twomey, historian
- Lili Wilkinson, author
- Clare Wright, historian, author
- Penny Wright, senator

== Notable staff ==
- Sonny Chua (1967–2020), concert pianist, director of music

== See also ==
- List of schools in Victoria, Australia
- MacRobertson Girls' High School buildings
