= Frank Penhalluriack =

Australian businessman, entrepreneur and political figure

1982 and 1984 ABC news reports of Frank Penhalluriack's attempt to trade on Sunday.

Francis Penhalluriack is an Australian businessman, entrepreneur and local political figure. He is most notable for opening his Caulfield, Victoria, hardware store outside of legislated trading hours in the 1980s. His actions eventually led to a dramatic change in retail trading laws in Victoria, Australia.

Penhalluriack initially studied at Hampton High School. After some of Hampton High School was destroyed by fire in 1957, he continued his studies at Melbourne High School. He subsequently graduated with a bachelor's degree in building from Melbourne University in 1962.

Penhalluriack stood unsuccessfully as an Australia Party candidate for the federal seat of Chisholm, in 1974.

== Trading hours activism ==
In the state of Victoria in the 1980s, the Local Government Act limited most retailers to trading during certain hours on Saturdays, and not at all on Sundays. Certain types of retailers were exempt from these restrictions, such as milk bars and service stations. Penhalluriack consistently ignored these laws, opening his hardware store outside of the legislated times. Melbourne talkback radio host and social commentator Derryn Hinch quipped at the time, "You can get a screw on Sunday but you can't get a screwdriver.", in reference to the fact that the Victorian government was legalising prostitution at the same time they were enforcing the weekend trading laws with particular attention to hardware stores.

Penhalluriack said retailing was a service industry, and his obligation was to provide that service when his customers’ demand was highest. "If it is a crime", he said, "it is a victimless crime with heinous penalties out of all proportion". The Australian Broadcasting Commission has put together some newscasts from that time.

Officers from the department of Labour and Industry repeatedly fined Penhalluriack for his breaches of the law, and the whole issue gained considerable local media attention. When he refused to pay he volunteered himself to spend time in jail, and was arrested by the Caulfield Police, who transferred him to the Glenferrie Road Malvern cell behind the Police Station. The next day he was transferred to Pentridge, where he was classified as a nuisance, and returned to his freedom. He was re-arrested at his shop the following Sunday, and spent a further 19 days in incarceration. in HM Prison Pentridge.

This was bad publicity for the State Government, who changed the law to give priority to the seizure of goods. When Penhalluriack refused to pay further fines the courts compelled the police to auction his stock to raise funds to pay the fine; the auction was a farce, with grateful shoppers paying many times the market price for the goods auctioned.

The conflict continued, and a frustrated Magistrate refused Penhalluriack's request for an adjournment, and fined him $501,000 for his failure to close his business on 21 occasions. This was a political disaster for the government, and the DPP offered to lodge an appeal on his behalf – but not against the conviction, only against the quantum. Since Penhalluriack had no intention to pay any fine he rejected their offer. The DPP had one month to serve the appeal notice on him personally, so he went to ground, Penhalluriack has always been supportive of his staff. He calls them ‘a wonderfully loyal and hard-working bunch’, and they continued to open 7 days a week while he was in jail or in hiding.

With the DPP's appeal safely behind him, and the government incensed at his temerity, the summons came at a rate of two every Saturday, and two more every Sunday. After a few months he had enough to stick them inside his front shop window, spelling out "$500k".

After almost twelve months Penhalluriack lodged his own appeal. It was out of time, but accepted by the Industrial Court of Victoria, The President was the only person to hear such appeals, and on day three he was seen sharing a tea break with some of the Department's Inspectors – who were witnesses in the case. The President refused to step down, and subsequently became quite ill. After he recovered he recommenced the case, and immediately declared a conflict of interest over the "tea party". By this time the government had once again amended the law, this time to permit the Deputy presidents to hear the matter. The final ruling was in Penhalluriack's favour, and the fine was quashed.

His attempt to serve a subpoena on then premier John Cain at a public appearance led to a scuffle with a yelling crowd of about 30 Right to Life demonstrators.

He also served the Premier with a birthday cake, walking into a press conference with his friend and hardware storekeeper Bob Wolstenholme. The Premier was speechless. “How many shopkeepers have ever achieved that?” asked Bob to the media who had chosen to abandon the Premier in favour of interviewing the two rebels.

In response to public pressure, the government changed retail trading laws in Victoria, Australia to permit weekend trading. After the introduction of Sunday trading, Penhalluriack's media profile dropped dramatically. Penhalluriack has an ongoing involvement in his local community, including as a Director of the Caulfield Park Bendigo Bank.

Penhalluriack continued to flout trading laws, opening his hardware store on Easter Sunday in 2005, under threat of a $10,000 fine. Penhalluriack has been quoted as follows:

"To me, shopping hours and trading days have nothing to do with the Government; it is a free enterprise system. The days I want to open and the hours I want to open are between my customers and me."
"If you've got a burst pipe, what do you do – wait for 20 hours?"

== Council ==
Penhalluriack was elected to his local council on 29 November 2008, representing the Camden Ward of the Glen Eira City Council.

His policy was to improve the efficiency and business outlook of the Council, and to open up the Caulfield Racecourse Reserve to the public. The Reserve is 143 acres (65 Ha) of Crown Land set aside in the nineteenth century for "a racecourse public park and public recreation ground". Only 21 race-meetings are held each year, and it plays second fiddle to Flemington, Melbourne's premier racecourse.

Council supported Penhalluriack's lead in this matter, and voted for sporting grounds and improved access to the centre of the track, the removal of training and stables which house 600 horses, and the removal of all opaque fencing (Council minutes 22 February 2011). The result is a tiny, inaccessible playground, some BBQ's and a jogging track.

Most of Penhalluriack's ideas were stillborn or quickly thwarted. For example, against continual criticism from council officers, he sought to demonstrate that Council's mulch storage was a potential source of Legionnaires' disease, and that deaths had been caused by similar establishments. "I would be ashamed to put up for sale the rubbish that is in the Council's bin," he said, "where the material at the back has remained undisturbed for over twelve months. Its conditions are ideal for bacterial growth – a source of moisture, warmth and food."

As a result of this campaign, he was accused of furthering his own business because he sold mulch in his garden centre. Penhalluriack vigorously denied any conflict of interest, pointing out that the mulch he sold was a negligible percentage of his total sales (0.02%) and that his mulch was quite different, being packages and pasteurised and in compliance with the Australian Standard.

Having overcome any objections from his colleagues, Penhalluriack thought the matter was settled until the Ombudsman was asked to investigate. The Ombudsman's report found that Penhalluriack may have had a conflict of interest and recommended that these matters should be referred to a Councillor Conduct Panel and to VCAT by the Secretary of the Department of Planning and Community alleging misconduct and gross misconduct. The tabling in Parliament of the Ombudsman's Report did considerable harm to Penhalluriack's reputation, and contributed to the loss of his seat at the 2012 council election.

On 28 March 2012 Ombudsman tabled his report in the Victorian Parliament. In it the Ombudsman accused Penhalluriack of misconduct, bullying and conflict of interest. The conflict of interest was that he interfered with the council's free mulch program, while his hardware store sold mulch. The report characterised the campaign as deliberate disruption using unsubstantiated health concerns, and noted Penhalluriack's lack of acknowledgement of "various conflicts of interest between his council role and his personal/business interests".

The Ombudsman's recommendations included that the Victorian government consider additional mechanisms to assist councils dealing with "difficult councillors", including the creation of an Integrity Commissioner, which would be a significant development in governance in Victoria.

Penhalluriack refused to attend an informal hearing into allegations that he bullied the CEO, describing the proceedings as a "kangaroo court". Penhalluriack was referred to a Councillor Conduct Panel in November 2011. Penhalluriack made an application to have the matter referred to the Victorian Civil and Administration Tribunal (VCAT), where Penhalluriack would be entitled to hear evidence under oath, and cross-examine his accusers; the application was accepted and the issue was referred. The VCAT hearing was adjourned after three days due to a conflict of interest by one of the VCAT members, and subsequently lapsed when Penhalluriak was not re-elected.

Penhalluriack made various counter-claims against the council, including a workplace insurance claim and stress levels causing him cardiac problems.
