= Kotzur =

Kotzur is a surname. Notable people with the surname include:

- Hilton Kotzur (born 1964), Australian rules footballer
- Kevin Kotzur (born 1989), American basketball player
