= Katharine Parton =

Australian musician

Katharine Parton (born 1982) is a British-Australian composer, conductor and researcher and was the first female Director of Music at Fitzwilliam College, Cambridge. She has multiple sclerosis.

== Education ==
Parton received early musical training in both Melbourne, Australia and Sunderland, UK attending government schools including The Mac.Robertson Girls' High School. She studied clarinet performance, vocal studies and conducting at the Faculty of Fine Arts and Music, The University of Melbourne studying with John Hopkins. She later received her PhD from The University of Melbourne for her research into conductor / orchestral musician gesture and social cognition. During her PhD she also studied at Royal Northern College of Music and The University of Cambridge.

== Career ==
Parton has held positions in both the UK and Australia, most notably as the first female director of music at Fitzwilliam College, Cambridge, a position she held from 2014 to 2017. Whilst director of music, she curated the college's Menuhin Centenary Celebrations which included a new scholarship, performances from the Fitzwilliam Quartet, an "In Conversation" event with Humphrey Burton, student performances and a summer school with former Menuhin student Akiko Ono. Parton is active as a composer being published by Encore Publications, Australian Music Centre and within the Multitude of Voyces volumes.

== Publications (music) ==
- 2020 Gaudebat et Ridebat for SATB and drum (Multitude of Voyces)
- 2022 The Floods for SSAATTBB (Encore Publications)
- 2022 Forsake Me Not for SATB and open score single line instrument (Encore Publications)
- 2023 Lux Perpetua No Later Light for SATB (Encore Publications)
- 2024 Another Day is Now Gone for SATB (Encore Publications)
- 2024 Oriel for string orchestra (Australian Music Centre)

== Publications (academic) ==
- Parton, Katharine (2014-08-08). "Epistemic stance in orchestral interaction". Social Semiotics. 24 (4): 402–419. doi:10.1080/10350330.2014.929389. ISSN 1035-0330. S2CID 144514475.
- Parton, Katharine; Edwards, Guy (December 2009). Features of conductor gesture: Towards a framework for analysis within interaction. Second International Conference on Music Communication Science.
