= George Furner Langley =

Australian Army officer

George Furner Langley DSO OStJ
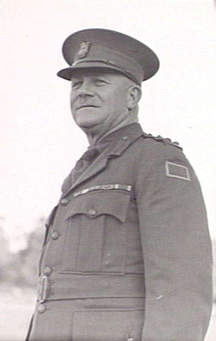
- Brigadier George Langley, commander of the 2nd Infantry Brigade, in July 1943
- Born: 1 May 1891; South Melbourne, Victoria
- Died: 24 August 1971 (aged 80); Killara, New South Wales
- Military career
- Allegiance: Australia
- Branch: Australian Army
- Service years: 1913–1934; 1940–1944
- Rank: Brigadier
- Commands: 2nd Infantry Brigade (1942–44); 38th Battalion (1940–42); 4th Light Horse Regiment (1925–29); 20th Light Horse Regiment (1920–24); 5th Light Horse Brigade (1919); 14th Light Horse Regiment (1918–19); 1st (Australian) Battalion, Imperial Camel Corps (1916–18)
- Conflicts: First World War; Gallipoli Campaign; Sinai and Palestine Campaign; Second World War; Home Front
- Awards: Commander of the Order of the British Empire; Distinguished Service Order; Efficiency Decoration; Mentioned in Despatches (4); Commander's Cross of the Order of the White Eagle (Serbia)

Brigadier George Furner Langley, CBE, DSO, ED (1 May 1891 – 24 August 1971) was an Australian soldier who served in both the First and Second World Wars. He was also an educationist, and the headmaster of a number of high schools in Victoria.

== Early life ==
Langley was born on 1 May 1891 in Port Melbourne. He attended Melbourne Continuation School and gained a Bachelor of Arts degree from the University of Melbourne and teaching qualifications from Melbourne Teachers' College and taught at Williamstown High School, then at the Mansfield Agricultural High School in Mansfield, Victoria until the outbreak of the First World War.

== Military career ==
=== First World War ===
Langley enlisted as a private in the 21st Battalion and was commissioned as a lieutenant on 24 March 1915. After training, the battalion was en route to Gallipoli on 2 September 1915 when the ship on which it was travelling, the Southland, was torpedoed. Langley helped with the evacuation of the ship until he collapsed. He and his battalion eventually landed at Gallipoli and remained there until evacuation in December.

After service in the Gallipoli Campaign, Langley was seconded to the Imperial Camel Corps to raise and train the 1st Australian Company, which by December 1916 was one of a number of companies that combined to become the 1st Anzac Battalion. In the latter stages of the Sinai and Palestine Campaign, Langley was an officer of the 14th Light Horse Regiment. He was awarded a Distinguished Service Order for "skilful leadership and conspicuous gallantry", and was mentioned in despatches four times.

=== Interwar period ===
On his return to Australia, Langley was appointed headmaster of Mansfield Agricultural High School in 1920. In 1924 he became headmaster of Warrnambool High School, a position he held for sixteen years. In 1940 he was transferred to Bendigo High School. He had remained in the Australian Army Reserve as a lieutenant colonel, and in this capacity had commanded various light horse regiments.

=== Second World War ===
In September 1940, Langley was made commander of 38th Battalion and then in 1942, was promoted to a temporary brigadier. Appointed commander of the 2nd Infantry Brigade, he oversaw the brigade, largely made up of militia conscripts, during its service in Western Australia and then from August 1943, in Darwin. Unfit for active duty, he eventually retired as an honorary brigadier in March 1944.

== Later life ==
After service in England and the Middle East with the Australian Red Cross from 1945 to 1946, Langley returned to teaching. He was the headmaster at Mordialloc High School in 1946 and 1947, and then at Box Hill High School in 1948. From 1949 he was headmaster at Melbourne High School for eight years. He was appointed Commander of the Order of the British Empire in 1958. The latter stages of his life were spent working on a history of the Australian Camel Corps. Five years after his death on 24 August 1971 in Sydney, his work Sand, Sweat and Camels was published by his wife.
