= Christina Montgomery =

Scottish-born Australian headmistress

Christina Smith Montgomery
- Born: 21 March 1870; Kelso, Scottish Borders
- Died: 27 August 1965 (aged 95); Brighton
- Education: University of Melbourne
- Occupation: Headmistress
- Employer: Victoria's Department of Education
- Known for: Founding head of Melbourne Girls' High School
- Successor: Sybil Llewelyn

Christina Smith Montgomery (March 21, 1870 – August 27, 1965) was a Scottish born Australian headmistress. She was the founding head of Melbourne Girls' High School which became the Mac.Robertson Girls' High School.

== Life ==
Montgomery was born in Kelso in the Scottish Borders where she gained a love for classical studies at Kelso Grammar School. When she was a teenager, her parents William and Janet (born Smith) emigrated. Christina and her sister, Margaret, renewed their education in Melbourne at Cambridge Street State School where they became pupil-teachers. Together they studied at Melbourne Teachers' College from 1891 where they both won prizes. Christina went on to the University of Melbourne where she graduated in 1897. She gained a Master's degree in 1900. Victoria's Department of Education had appointed its first director, Frank Tate, and it had begun to employ women graduates. Montgomery was one of the first.

Tate noticed the Junior teacher, Montgomery, had respect from her classes despite her small size, but she had to wait to find promotion. She went to work for Perth Central Girls' School for a year and when she returned she was promoted. In 1905 she was teaching Latin at Melbourne Continuation School. In 1923 she became the headmistress under the head of the, then, co-educational school. The school was split into two halves in 1927. The boys moved to create Melbourne Boys' High School in South Yarra. The remaining building was condemned but the girls continued to be educated there. It was renamed Melbourne Girls' High School and Montgomery was its headmistrss.

In 1930 the school was moved to Government House. When she retired in 1932 it was said that she still at her height of her career. There were over 800 students in the school paying six pounds every term. Five years before there had been less than four hundred. There was a ceremony at the Lyceum Club in Melbourne with 50 fellow teachers present.

Sybil Llewelyn was appointed as head in 1933 when the school moved again, In 1934 the school re-opened in new buildings as the Mac.Robertson Girls' High School in 1934 with Mary Hutton as head.

Montgomery enjoyed a long retirement. She travelled and in 1950 her well illustrated travel book, Recaptured in Tranquility, was published which included her accounts of her travels and essays. Montgomery died in the Melbourne suburb of Brighton.
