= Dorothy Shineberg =

Australian historian

- Born: Dorothy Lois Munro; February 1927; Hampton, Victoria, Victoria, Australia
- Died: 19 August 2004 (aged 77); Australia
- Occupation: Historian

Academic background
- Education: Mac.Robertson Girls' High School
- Alma mater: University of Melbourne
- Thesis: The sandalwood trade in the south-west Pacific, 1830–1865, with special reference to the problems and effects of early contact between Europeans and Melanesians (1965)

Dorothy Lois Shineberg (February 1927 – 19 August 2004) was an Australian historian who specialised in Melanesian history. In 1950, she was the first Australian woman to win a Fulbright Travelling Scholarship and later taught the first courses in Pacific history at an Australian university.

== Early life and education ==
Shineberg was born in Hampton, Victoria in February 1927. After her father's death in 1936 she and her four sisters were brought up by their mother. She won a scholarship to attend the selective Mac.Robertson Girls' High School and later another scholarship for University of Melbourne, from which she graduated in 1946 with a BA (Hons). She also had an MA from Smith College. She completed her PhD (1961–1965) at the same university, with a thesis titled "The sandalwood trade in the south-west Pacific, 1830–1865, with special reference to the problems and effects of early contact between Europeans and Melanesians".

== Career ==
Following graduation, Shineberg tutored at the University of Melbourne in 1947. She moved to Sydney to take a position as tutor in colonial history with the Australian School of Pacific Administration (ASOPA) for three years. Her colleagues included anthropologists Camilla Wedgwood and Ian Hogbin, lawyers John Kerr and Hal Wootten and poet James McAuley.

In 1950, she was the first Australian woman to win a Fulbright Travelling Scholarship which took her to Smith College in Massachusetts for two years where she completed a Master of Arts. Her work was influenced by Italian historian and anti-Fascist Max Salvadori.

On her return, she taught the first Pacific history courses ever run by any university in Australia to students at the University of Melbourne. While completing her PhD thesis, Shineberg spent 1964 at the Australian National University (ANU) as research fellow in the Department of Pacific History, Research School of Pacific Studies.

After a career spent in both research and teaching at ANU, Shineberg retired from her position of Reader in 1988, but returned as visiting fellow.

She served on the editorial board of the Journal of Pacific History from 1966 to 1997, including as co-editor from 1987 to 1990. A member of the Pacific History Association, she was granted life membership in 1998.

She contributed three biographies for the Australian Dictionary of Biography – Ranulph Dacre, Richard Jones and Robert Towns. Her research papers are held in the ANU Archives.

== Selected works ==
- Shineberg, Dorothy (1967), "They Came for Sandalwood: A Study of the Sandalwood Trade in the South-West Pacific 1830–1865", The Geographical Journal, 135 (2), Melbourne University Press: 284, Bibcode:1969GeogJ.135..284S, doi:10.2307/1796886, JSTOR 1796886
- Shineberg, Dorothy (1973), Ils étaient venus chercher du santal: étude sur le trafic du bois de santal en Nouvelle-Calédonie et aux Nouvelles-Hébrides de 1830 à 1865, Surleau, André (translator) (3e éd ed.), Nouvelle-Calédonie Société d'études historiques de la Nouvelle-Calédonie
- Shineberg, Dorothy (31 May 1999), The people trade: Pacific Island laborers and New Caledonia, 1865–1930, Center for Pacific Islands Studies, School of Hawaiian, Asian, and Pacific Studies, University of Hawai'i : University of Hawai'i Press (published 1999), ISBN 978-0-8248-6491-0

== Personal ==
Shineberg married Barry Shineberg, with whom she had a son and a daughter, Michael and Susan, in 1953.

She was diagnosed with cancer in 2002 and died on 19 August 2004. She was survived by her husband and her children. Bronwen Douglas concluded her obituary in the Journal of Pacific History, writing "Pacific history has lost one of its most distinguished founders".
