= Margery Fraser Robertson =

Australian teacher and educationist

- Born: 1 July 1858; South Melbourne, Colony of Victoria
- Died: 9 January 1933 (aged 74); South Yarra, Victoria, Australia
- Occupation: educator

Margery Fraser Robertson (1 July 1858 – 9 January 1933) was an Australian teacher and educationist. She was the head-mistress at what was later called Melbourne High School.

== Life ==
Robertson was born in South Melbourne in 1858. She was the first of nine children born to Margaret (born Fraser) and James Robertson. Her parents were both born in Scotland and they emigrated unmarried in 1854 from Inverness. Robertson completed five years work as a pupil-teacher at Emerald Hill State School before she entered their training facility. She was taught by Frederick John Gladman and she found his ideas about education influential. Gladman was employed by the British and Foreign School Society, and he was an advocate for the Monitorial System where abler students taught the less able.

Robertson began teaching at a time when there was no government secondary schools but there were examinations designed for those intending to enter the civil service and to matriculate. The education department valued her and they promoted her to the highest level ever achieved by a woman. Victoria's first state secondary school opened in 1905 with over 200 students and 135 of these were girls. Joseph Hocking, an inspector of schools, was named the first principal of what was later called Melbourne High School and Robertson became his temporary assistant. In 1907 she became Melbourne High School's senior mistress and in 1909 she had the title of headmistress.

Robertson held separate assemblies for the girls and she was renowned for high expectations of her student's work and behaviour. She adopted the watchword of "Be Strong"; she believed that her girls needed to be interdependent but without sacrificing their individuality. She retired in 1922 and Hocking was there to speak of her qualities and her devotion to her work.

Robertson died in South Yarra in 1933. She made a major influence on education; she was described as prim, proper and maybe a bit lonely.
