= Rosea Kemp =

Australian meteorologist

- Born: 5 June 1941
- Died: 27 December 2015 (aged 74)
- Alma mater: University of Melbourne
- Occupation: Meteorologist, weather presenter

Rosea Lilian Kemp (5 June 1941 – 27 December 2015) was an Australian meteorologist.

Rosea Lilian Boyd was born on 5 June 1941 in Melbourne, and named after Mount Rosea, in The Grampians, where her parents had taken their honeymoon. She attended Hampton High School and MacRobertson Girls' School.

She was first woman to be awarded an Australian Bureau of Meteorology cadetship, enabling her to study for a Bachelor of Science degree at the University of Melbourne. She joined the bureau in 1959, after her mother successfully lobbied for a change in the rules to allow women to apply for cadetships, and was one of two women who were the second and third to graduate from its training school, in 1962.

Moving to England, she achieved fame as a weather forecaster for BBC radio in London, employed—as was usual at the time—by the Met Office. She was then the only woman broadcasting weather forecasts in England. During that period, she appeared as a castaway on the BBC Radio programme Desert Island Discs on 25 December 1968. She also met and married fellow Australian John Kemp, while working in the UK.

After returning to Australia on 1 December 1969, on board the SS Oriana, she again worked at the Bureau of Meteorology, and then ran a consultancy, called Weatherex, with Don Douglas, studying the storms of the New South Wales coast, before returning to the bureau for a third stint in September 1988.

She received the Bureau of Meteorology long-service award in 2003, in the presence of her mother.

She died on 27 December 2015 in Sydney, survived by two sons. An obituary was published in the Bulletin of the Australian Meteorological and Oceanographic Society.

She was described as:

a trailblazer for women in Australian meteorology, being the first woman to be awarded a cadetship by the Bureau of Meteorology to study for her BSc

by The Encyclopedia of Australian Science and Innovation.
