= Noel Bayliss =

Professor of chemistry, University of Western Australia

Sir Noel Stanley Bayliss CBE FAA (19 December 1906 – 17 February 1996) was an Australian chemist and professor of chemistry at the University of Western Australia. He was a Rhodes Scholar and graduated as dux of the academically renowned Melbourne High School. He then attended the University of Melbourne before going to Lincoln College, Oxford. The mineral baylissite K_{2}Mg(CO_{3})2•4(H_{2}O) is named for him.
