= Mary Hutton (principal) =

Australian teacher and principal

- Hutton in 1933
- Born: 28 October 1883; Hawthorn
- Died: 28 December 1964 (aged 81); Fitzroy
- Education: Melbourne Training College
- Occupation: teacher
- Employer: Mac.Robertson Girls' High School

Mary Hutton (28 October 1883 – 20 December 1964) was an Australian teacher who became the first head of Mac.Robertson Girls' High School in Melbourne after it was renamed in 1934 and led it through the war when the building was requisitioned. She stood down in 1946 and served as a part-time teacher under the new head.

== Life ==
Hutton was born in the Melbourne suburb of Hawthorn in 1883. Her parents were Isabel Jane, née Townsend and her gentleman husband Colin Fergusson Hutton. Her mother came from Adelaide and her father was a Scottish immigrant. She was educated at the local state school and by a tutor. She was "promising" as a pupil-teacher at Hawksburn State School and at Melbourne Training College she qualified as a teacher and won the 1904 prize named for Frederick John Gladman which was given to the best student that year at the college. Two years later she also became a qualified infant teacher.

Hutton took over the leadership of Melbourne Girls' High School from Christina Smith Montgomery who had emerged as the first head of the school in 1927 when Melbourne Continuation School split and the boys were moved out into another building. Montgomery retired in 1932. Sybil Llewellyn was appointed as the new head in 1933 but she had to resign the same year due to illness. Hutton was then identified as the new head.

Hutton became the first head of Mac.Robertson Girls' High School as the Melbourne Girls' High School was renamed when it moved to a new building in November 1934. The building in Albert Park had been made possible due to the philanthropy of a bequest by Sir Macpherson Robertson. During the war the school building was requisitioned and the students were taught at different locations. The school's students reassembled it 1943 and, despite the disturbance, the public's perception of the schools importance increased.

Hutton struggled with discrimination based on gender. She had to prepare her girls for a future where they could not expect equal opportunity and she was paid less than her male peers even though her performance outmatched theirs. She was only recognised as a Principal in 1945.

In 1946 Gainfort became the vice-Principal of the school and.when Hutton relinquished the role in 1948 Gainfort took over the school. In 1949 when there were 700 students on the role. Hutton believed that teaching was an honour and for six years after she stood down Hutton was still employed as a part-time teacher.

Hutton died in 1964 in the Melbourne suburb of Fitzroy.
