= Jack Daniel (cricketer) =

Australian cricketer

Personal information
- Born: 9 December 1923; Leeds, Yorkshire, England
- Died: 12 October 2002 (aged 78); Tugun, Queensland, Australia
- Batting: Right-handed
- Bowling: Right-arm fast-medium
- Role: Bowler

Domestic team information
- Years: Team
- 1947/48–1950/51: Victoria

Career statistics
Competition	First-class
Matches	7
Runs scored	98
Batting average	10.88
100s/50s	0/0
Top score	44
Balls bowled	1318
Wickets	27
Bowling average	17.70
5 wickets in innings	2
10 wickets in match	0
Best bowling	6/20
Catches/stumpings	1/–
- Source: CricketArchive, 22 December 2012

Jack Daniel (9 December 1923 – 12 October 2002) was an Australian sportsman who played both cricket and baseball at high levels.

Born in Leeds, England, Daniel emigrated to Melbourne at an early age with his family. Having attended Hampton High School, he made his first-grade debut for the Melbourne Cricket Club in the VCA district competition during the 1940–41 season, aged 16. Daniel enlisted in the Australian Army in September 1942, and served overseas, attaining the rank of corporal before his discharge in 1946. After his return to Australia, he continued to play for Melbourne at grade cricket level, and good form saw him selected to play for Victoria at state level against Tasmania during the 1947–48 season. Although Daniel went wicketless during the match, he was again selected to play against Tasmania in two first-class matches the following season. In the first match, a rain-ruined game held at the TCA Ground in Hobart, he recorded first-innings figures of 6/37, dismissing Tasmania's first four batsman, and then hit 44 runs in Victoria's only innings. In the next match, held at the NTCA Ground in Launceston, he took figures of 6/20 in Tasmania's first innings, helping to dismiss the side for only 65 runs.

During the same season, Daniel played a match for the Victorian Second XI against the equivalent New South Wales team, and hit future Australian captain Richie Benaud over the eye with a bouncer, causing him to miss several matches with a fractured skull. He made his Sheffield Shield debut in the 1949–50 season, but failed to take a wicket in his two matches. Daniel would play two further first-class matches, both against Tasmania during the 1950–51 season, but did not play at state level after that season. Forming a successful opening bowling partnership with Clive Fairbairn at grade cricket level, he finally retired from Melbourne at the end of the 1957–58 season, having played 203 games for a club record 485 wickets at an average of 19.49, as well as scoring 4399 runs at an average of 25.13. Daniel worked at a shoe company in later life, and was also a noted baseball player, playing first grade for the Melbourne Baseball Club. In retirement, he lived on the Gold Coast, dying there at the age of 78.
