= Gweneth Wisewould =

Australian medical practitioner (1884–1972)

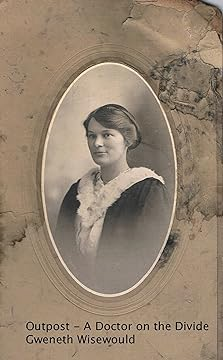
- Born: 30 August 1884; Brighton, Victoria, Australia
- Died: 20 January 1972 (aged 87); Trentham, Victoria, Australia
- Other name: Dr Gwen
- Education: University of Melbourne
- Occupation: Doctor
- Partner: Isabella Bell

Gweneth Wisewould (30 August 1884 – 20 January 1972) was an Australian medical practitioner. Driven out of Melbourne she established a practice at Trentham where she was appreciated by a "grateful public".

== Life ==
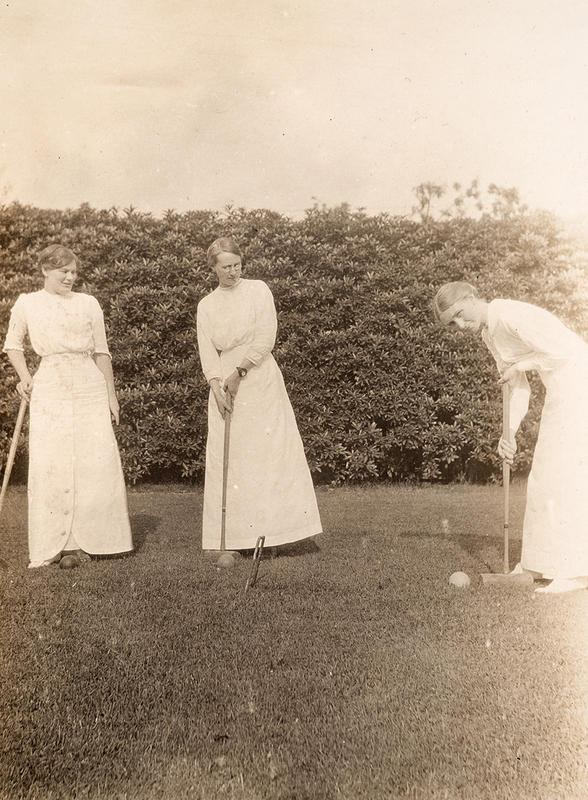
Doctors Wisewould, Annie Lister Bennett and Ellen Balaam playing croquet in 1915

Wisewould was born in 1884 in Brighton, Victoria. She was the only child of Isabel Alice (born Field) and Francis Wisewould. Her father was a solicitor. Her parents employed tutors for her and she was able to enrol in the University of Melbourne. She graduated in 1915.

In 1938 she and her partner Isabella Bell ('Ellabelle') moved out of Melbourne to Trentham. She had practiced in Melbourne where she had taught students about anaesthesia and performed ear, nose and throat operations at the Queen Victoria Memorial Hospital. She was obliged to move after her practice diminished as the result of gossip. She was unconventional, but there was no evidence of the rumoured sexual impropriety or incapacity. In Trentham she resolved to treat "the whole patient".

Isabella Bell died in 1953. Wisewould continued to wear men's clothing and she explained that doing her job and being pretty was not an easy combination.

== Death and legacy ==
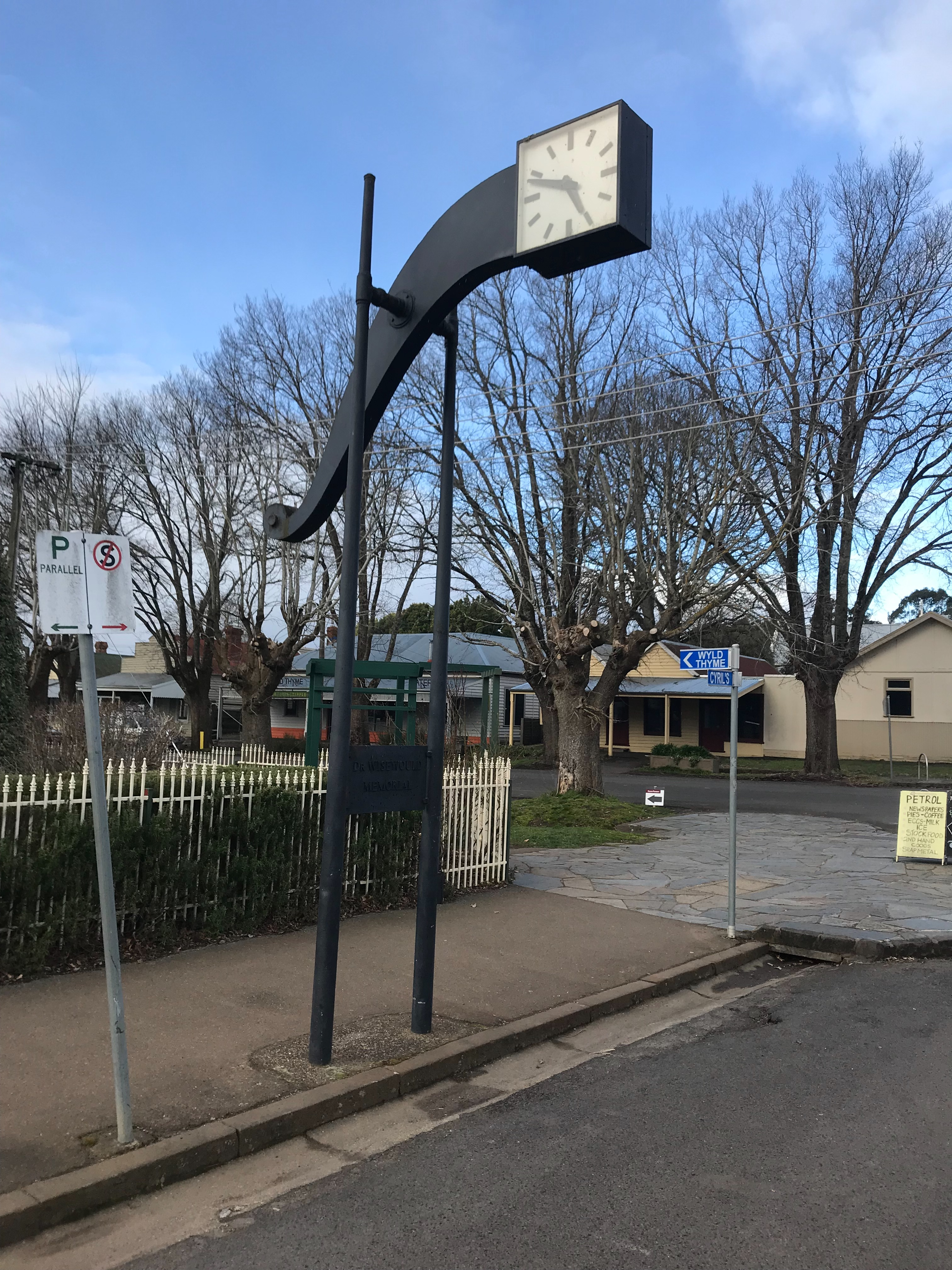
Her memorial clock in Trentham's High Street

Wisewould never retired and she died in Trentham in 1972. She had published her memoir, Outpost a Doctor on the Divide, the year before and it had been favourably received as it described her regard for the town and the developments in Victoria during her time there. In 1968, Wisewould made a donation to the University of Melbourne to establish the Truganini Scholarship for Aboriginal students. The people of Trentham paid for a plaque to be made by the artist Stanley Hammond and a memorial clock was installed in the town by a "grateful public". In 1994, Ian Braybrook published her biography, Gweneth Wisewould: Outpost Doctor.
