= Hilton Kotzur =

Australian rules footballer

Personal information
- Born: 20 January 1964 (age 62)
- Original team: Walbundrie
- Height: 188 cm (6 ft 2 in)
- Weight: 86 kg (190 lb)

Playing career^{1}
Years	Club	Games (Goals)
1985	Sydney Swans	1 (0)
- ^{1} Playing statistics correct to the end of 1985.

Hilton Kotzur (born 20 January 1964) is a former Australian rules footballer who played with the Sydney Swans in the Victorian Football League (VFL).

Kotzur won the 1979 Hume Football League Third 18 best and fairest award and represented New South Wales as a junior, but was also a member of the Victorian team which won the 1981 Teal Cup, earning All-Australian honours.

He joined the Swans when they were still based in Melbourne and played both Under-19s and reserves football for the club, before he fractured two vertebrae in 1982. The back injury stalled his career and it was not until 1985 that he got an opportunity in the seniors, called up for Sydney's round three fixture against Fitzroy at the Sydney Cricket Ground. He took four marks and had six disposals, in a 51-point loss. It would be his only league appearance.

An ankle injury, which required a reconstruction, made Kotzur retire. He spent one year playing for Sydney Football League team St George AFC, which were coached by another former Sydney player Steven Taubert.
