= Hampton High School, Melbourne =

Coordinates: 37°56′0″S 145°0′24″E

Hampton High School
- Hampton, Melbourne, Victoria, 3188; Australia

Information
- Type: State-run high school
- Motto: Summa Pete (Aim for the Highest)
- Established: 1935
- Status: Closed
- Closed: 1988
- Campus type: Suburban
- Song: Aim for the Highest

Hampton High School is a former secondary school located in the Hampton suburb of Melbourne, Australia. The school occupied the block bounded by Ludstone, Favril and Passchendaele Streets. Established in 1935, the school was closed in 1988. Alumni are known as Old Hamptonians.

== History ==
In 1924, the Education Department purchased land in Ludstone St Hampton from the War Service Homes Commission. The land had previously been a part of the Castlefield Estate, which later became Haileybury College. Following the purchase, a single story building designed by architect Percy Everett was built. The school campus also included a sporting oval on the western side of the property. While the sports field was utilised for various sporting activities, football and cricket were played on the Castlefield Reserve. In 1952, a two-storied Manual Arts Block in the modernist style (again designed by Percy Everett) was built to provide additional accommodation, as well as provide facilities for teaching art, craft, woodwork, metalwork and domestic science.

In 1957, a fire destroyed the majority of the main building. A newly renovated building was opened in 1959, which was representative of the style of the original 1930s building. During this time, a new single-storied building was erected on the western side of the main building to support the growing number of matriculation students. This building became the prototype for many Victorian high schools that were built to support other schools throughout Victoria. In 1966, the boys' locker room at the southern end of the west wing building was partly demolished to make way for new science laboratories, which were funded through a federal government grant.

== Notable alumni ==
- Erin Scutter – Convicted of Murdering 3 People, 2025
- Ivan Hajncl – Business Analyst
- Tony Kyriacou – Lawyer
- Jack Daniel – cricketer
- Ross Dimsey – film executive, producer, director, screenwriter
- Rhonda Galbally – disability advocate
- Rosea Kemp (née Boyd) - metrologist
- Sir Brian Murray – Governor of Victoria
- Frank Penhalluriack – business executive/Crusaded for Sunday trading
- Bob Shearer – golfer
- Ross G. Smith – footballer, Brownlow medal winner
- Shane Warne – cricketer
- Alex Chernov – Governor of Victoria 2011–2015
- Garry Sebo – Grand Master Victoria Freemasons
