= Neil Roberts (Australian footballer) =

Australian rules footballer (born 1933)

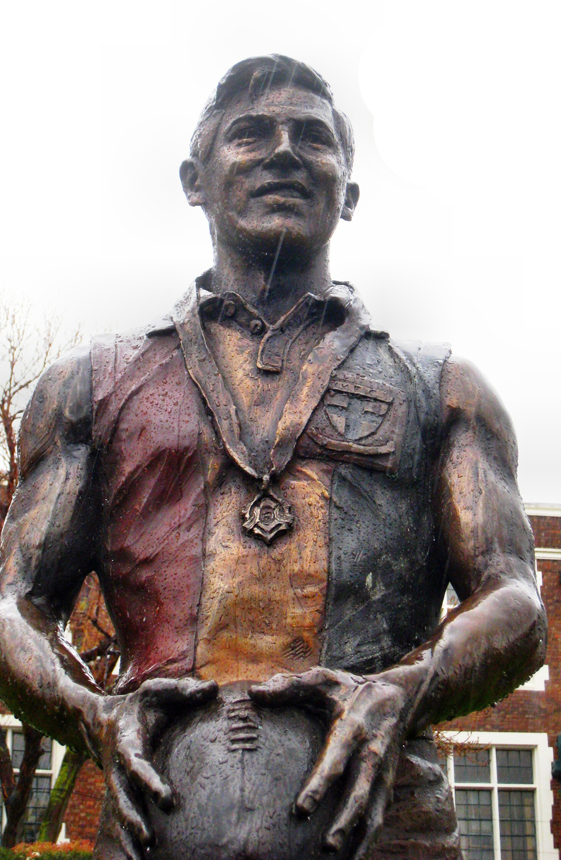
- Life-size bronze statue at Melbourne High School

Personal information
- Born: 15 June 1933 (age 93)
- Original team: Melbourne High School Old Boys
- Height: 185 cm (6 ft 1 in)
- Weight: 84.5 kg (186 lb)

Playing career^{1}
Years	Club	Games (Goals)
1952–1962	St Kilda	169 (40)
- ^{1} Playing statistics correct to the end of 1962.

Career highlights
- Australian Football Hall of Fame Inductee 2015; St Kilda Best and Fairest 1955, 1958; St Kilda Team of the Century (Centre half back); Brownlow Medallist 1958; Victorian state representative 11 times; All Australian 1958

Neil Edwin Roberts (born 15 June 1933) is a former Australian rules footballer in the Victorian Football League (VFL) and a Brownlow Medalist.

== Early life ==
Neil Roberts was born on 15 June 1933 to parents Edwin (Ted) Roberts (a former soccer player who migrated from England to East Brighton, Victoria) and Lelia Elfreda Roberts, née Kilby. Roberts attended Melbourne High School between 1946 and 1949. He played under 19s football at full-forward with the Melbourne High School Old Boys Football Club where he was recruited by the St Kilda.

== VFL career ==
Roberts debuted for St Kilda in 1952 and initially played on the forward line but despite his strong overhead marking was shifted to defence due to inaccurate goalkicking and later excelled as a centre half back, winning the Brownlow Medal in 1958. He captained the side from 1959 to 1962 before retiring at 29 years of age and commencing a career in sports journalism. He was inducted to the Saints inaugural Hall of Fame in 2003.

== Personal life and post football career ==
Roberts later worked for the Australian Antarctic Division (AAD) and was the officer in charge of Mawson Station – a base in the Australian Antarctic Territory – during 1971–1973. After leaving AAD, he became a farmer.

His son, Michael Roberts, also played for the Saints and was later a sports broadcaster.
