= Bronwen Phyllis Douglas =

Australian ethnohistorian, professor (born 1946)

- Born: 8 July 1946 (age 80); Adelaide, Australia
- Education: University of Adelaide; Adelaide Teachers' College; Australian National University
- Occupation: Pacific ethnohistorian

Bronwen Phyllis Douglas (born 1946), is an Australian ethnohistorian whose major research topics have concerned the global concept of race and its particular manifestations in Oceania, specifically the Pacific Islands, Island Southeast Asia and Australia.

== Biography ==
Douglas was an only child, born on 8 July 1946 in Adelaide, Australia, to Jean Naughton Craig and Joseph Campbell Craig who worked as a railroad guard. After her father died suddenly in 1955, she was raised by her mother who supported them by working as a health inspector.

=== Education ===
Douglas attended Adelaide Technical High School and Woodville High School in South Australia and won several scholarships, which allowed her to earn a university education at no cost. She graduated in 1966 with a BA in History from the University of Adelaide combined with a Diploma of Teaching from the Adelaide Teachers' College. Later that year, she left Adelaide for Canberra, to accept a PhD scholarship in Pacific History at the Australian National University (AUN). There she was supervised by historian Dorothy Shineberg. In 1972 she was awarded a doctorate with her thesis titled, A history of culture contact in north-eastern New Caledonia, 1774-1870.

=== Career ===
Douglas worked as a Senior Tutor in History at La Trobe University, Melbourne, in 1971. The next year she became a Lecturer in History and gained tenure in 1973 and was promoted Senior Lecturer in 1979. She was teaching at La Trobe University "during the great days of the Melbourne 'ethnographic history' school of which she was an enthusiastic member." In 1996, she left La Trobe University and accepted an appointment as a Fellow in the Research School of Pacific and Asian Studies at the Australian National University (ANU), Canberra. Her last promotion was to Senior Fellow in 2000. She retired from ANU in December 2012, and accepted a new appointment as an Adjunct Senior Fellow in the ANU College of Asia and the Pacific. During her academic career at ANU, she supervised 13 successful PhD students. Even after her retirement, she continued to advise doctoral candidates and mentor younger colleagues and students.

She was able to conduct only limited research during the early years of her career because of her teaching and parental responsibilities, although she did "publish a seminal article on Pacific leadership and original perspectives on fighting and religious encounters in New Caledonia and Vanuatu." After 1996 and working at ANU, Douglas was able to dedicate more time to her writing and research. She remains an honorary professor at ANU and her archives are kept there.

She has served as editor-elect of the Journal of Pacific History and co-editor of Palgrave Studies in Pacific History.

Douglas was elected a fellow of the Australian Academy of the Humanities (2020).

=== Personal life ===
She was married in 1967 to Charles Douglas and they had two daughters.

== Selected works ==
- Douglas, Bronwen. "Rank, power, authority: A reassessment of traditional leadership in South Pacific societies." The Journal of Pacific History 14, no. 1 (1979): 2-27.
- Douglas, Bronwen. "Christian citizens: women and negotiations of modernity in Vanuatu." The Contemporary Pacific (2002): 1-38.
- Douglas, Bronwen, Fanny Wonu Veys, and Billie Lythberg. Collecting in the South Sea: The Voyage of Bruni d’Entrecasteaux 1791–1794. Sidestone Press, 2018.
- Herda, Phyllis, and Bronwen Douglas. "Tongans in 1793." In Collecting in the South Sea: The Voyage of Bruni, Entrecasteaux 1791-1794, pp. 255-266. Sidestone Press, 2018.
