= Gareth W. Peters =

Australian academic

Gareth William Peters
- Citizenship: Australian

Academic background
- Education: University of New South Wales; University of Cambridge; University of Melbourne
- Thesis: Advances in approximate Bayesian computation and trans-dimensional sampling methodology

Academic work
- Discipline: Actuarial Science
- Institutions: University of California, Santa Barbara
- Main interests: Actuarial Science; Statistics for Risk and Insurance; Time Series Econometrics

Gareth W. Peters is an Australian endowed chair professor of actuarial science at the University of California, Santa Barbara and an honorary professor of statistics at University College London. As at 2024, he is also a member of the international advisory board of the Institute of Statistical Mathematics.

== Education ==
Peters has both a Bachelor of Engineering and Bachelor of Science with first class honors from the University of Melbourne, a Master of Science from the University of Cambridge and a PhD in Mathematics and Statistics from the University of New South Wales.

== Career ==
Before joining the University of California, Santa Barbara, Peters held academic positions at Heriot-Watt University, University College London and University of New South Wales. He has published over 150 peer-reviewed articles on risk and insurance modelling and 2 research text books on Operational Risk and Insurance. He has also been the editor and contributor to 3 edited text books on Monte Carlo methods and spatial statistics.

== Research work ==
Gareth W. Peters is a researcher primarily in time series modelling and econometrics, quantitative risk, actuarial science and insurance. Peters' research shows that mortality rates have heteroscedastic behaviour and incorporating heteroscedasticity and stochastic volatility in the estimation of life tables markedly improves model fit despite an increase of model complexity.[8] This is consistent with the cohort effects[9] widely documented[10] in mortality observations.

His research work has been cited by the Swiss Association of Actuaries and informed central bank senior delegates around the world.
