= Ellen Balaam =

Australian physician (1891-1985)

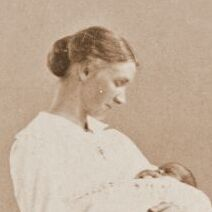
- in 1915
- Born: Ellen Maud Balaam; 30 November 1891; Melbourne, Victoria
- Died: 1985 (aged 93–94)
- Occupation: Physician

Ellen Balaam (1891–1985) was an Australian physician and the first woman surgeon in Melbourne.

== Early life and education ==
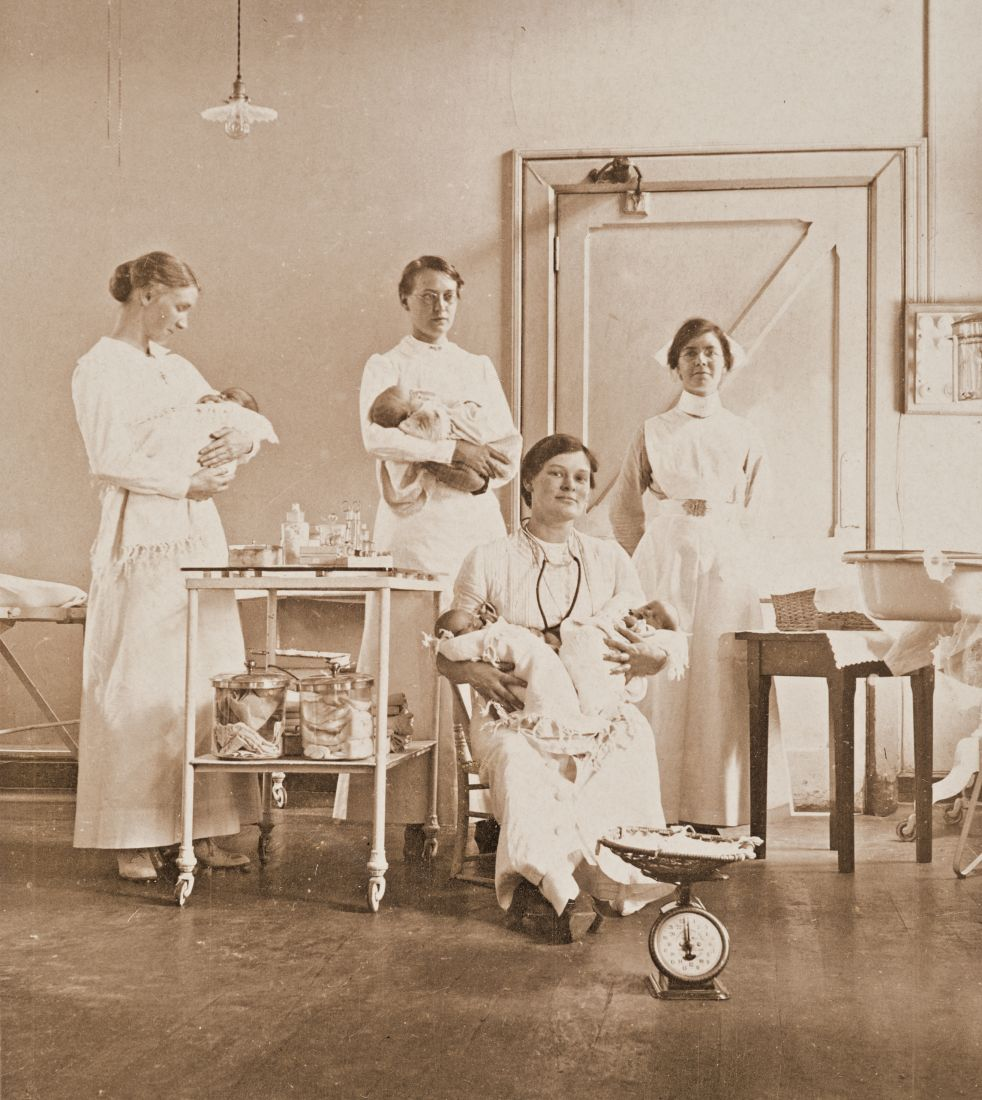
Drs Ellen Balaam, Annie Bennett and Gweneth Wisewould and a nurse at the Women’s Hospital in 1915

Ellen Maud Balaam was born on 30 November 1891 in Melbourne, Victoria to Harry and Ellen Balaam. Inspired at a young age to pursue a medical career, she attended Melbourne Continuation School (later MacRobertson's Girls High School) from 1906 to 1908 where she won a scholarship at the end of primary school to continue her schooling at high school. She won a further scholarship to attend university, and enrolled in medicine at the University of Melbourne. She taught mathematics at a public school in order to supplement this scholarship. She graduated in 1915 with her M.D., with second class honours in all subjects.

== Career ==
Balaam was appointed to a resident medical officer position at the Melbourne Hospital the following year. She married her classmate, Dr Thomas Wright in 1916, and they both served as medical officers. They went into practice together, before Balaam was appointed to a clinical assistant position at the Queen Victoria Hospital in 1917. She was steadily promoted over the next years to a full-time position and surgeon in 1924. One of the first women to practise general surgery in Melbourne. She continued to practise medicine and surgery until 1952, when she retired. Her husband died in 1964.

Balaam died in 1985.

== Legacy ==
Balaam was a supporter of the Melbourne Continuation School. The Dr Ellen Balaam Award for Promise in Science award is given in her name by the Palladian Society (past pupils) of the School.
