= Steven Taubert =

Australian rules footballer

Personal information
- Full name: Steven Taubert
- Born: 6 October 1953 (age 73); Ruckman
- Original team: MHS Old Boys
- Height: 193 cm (6 ft 4 in)
- Weight: 85 kg (187 lb)
- Position: Ruckman

Playing career^{1}
Years	Club	Games (Goals)
1974–76	Richmond	15 (14)
1977–81	Essendon	64 (30)
1982–84	Sydney	44 (26)
Total		123 (70)
- ^{1} Playing statistics correct to the end of 1984.

Steven Taubert (born 6 October 1953) is a former Australian rules footballer who played for Richmond, Essendon and Sydney in the Victorian Football League (VFL), and was Sydney's Ruck Coach from 1999 until 2018.

A Melbourne High School Old Boy, Taubert played initially at Tom Hafey's strong Richmond team of the 1970s. He debuted in 1974, a premiership year for Richmond, but despite appearing in the last two home and away season games he was not picked in the finals. Taubert crossed to Essendon in 1977 and two seasons later finally got to experience finals football. He played as a ruckman and was often pushed back into defence.

It was in Sydney where he played his best football, with his best performances coming in his final season. Although he had polled in only two Brownlow Medal counts previously, Taubert caused a surprise in 1984 by claiming 15 votes, with four 'best-on-ground's. He finished fourth and was comfortably the best Sydney Swans vote getter, however he did not take home a Bob Skilton Medal that year. Taubert retired at the end of the 1984 season.

Taubert returned to Sydney as their ruck coach in 1999, overseeing players such as Greg Stafford, Jason Ball, Stephen Doyle, Darren Jolly, Mike Pyke, Mark Seaby, Shane Mumford, and Sam Naismith. He was highly regarded by the players, particularly Jolly, who came to Sydney unproven at the senior level, and Pyke, who came to Sydney as a total novice from Canadian rugby union. Jolly even sought Taubert's advice during a form slump at his new team, Collingwood, in 2010. Taubert retired as ruck coach at the end of the 2017 home and away season.
