= Melbourne High School =

Government selective secondary school in Melbourne, Australia

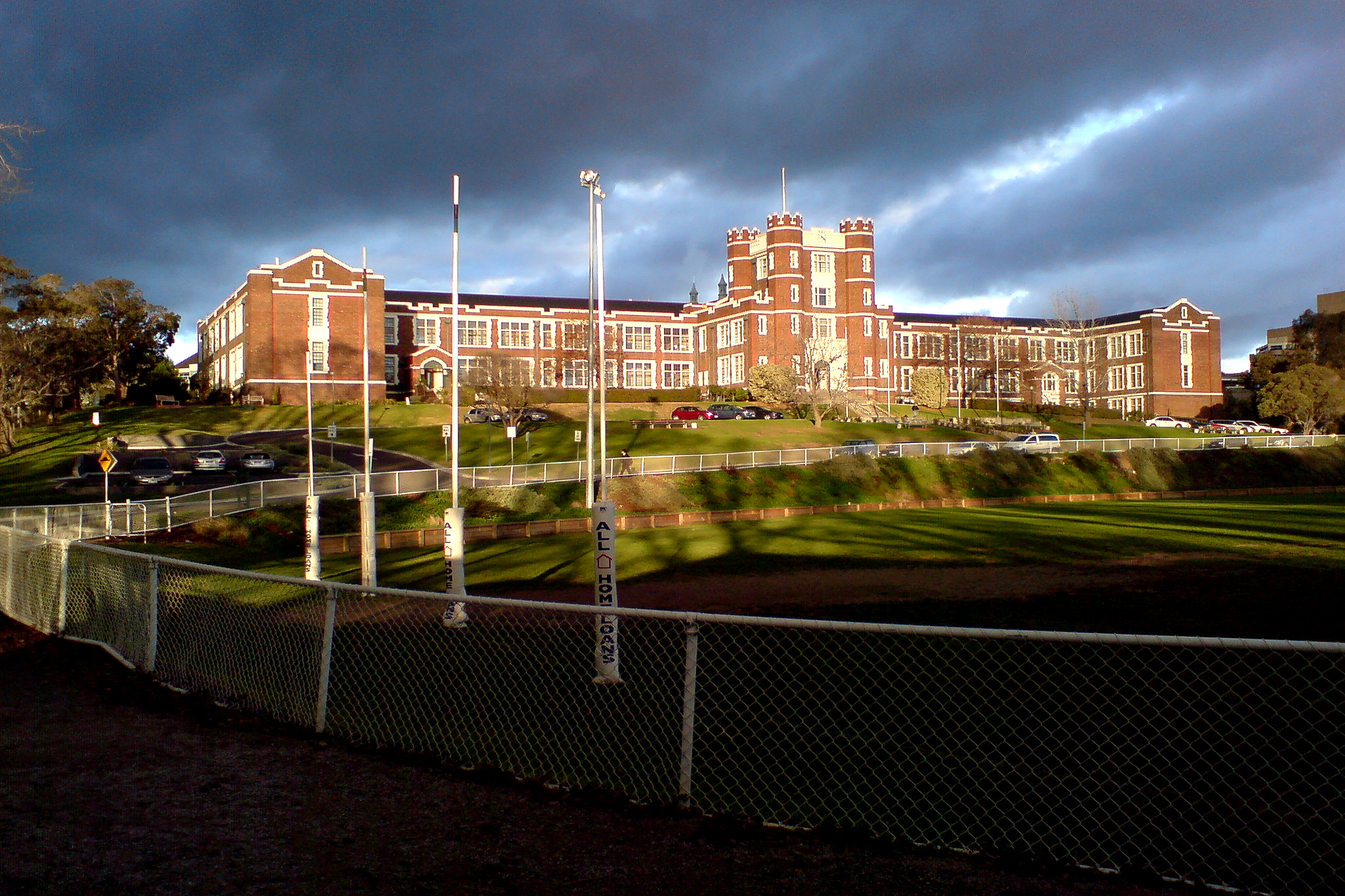
- The main building of Melbourne High School, named the "Twenties Building" or "T Building"

Location
- Forrest Hill, South Yarra, Melbourne, Victoria; Australia; 37°50′8″S 144°59′40″E

Information
- Type: Government-funded single-sex academically selective secondary day school
- Motto: Honour the work
- Established: 1905; 121 years ago
- Founder: Frank Tate
- Sister school: Mac.Robertson Girls' High School
- Principal: Tony Mordini
- Years: 9–12
- Gender: Boys
- Enrolment: 1,371 (2023)
- Houses: Como, Forrest, Yarra, Waterloo
- Colours: Maroon, green, and black
- Song: "Honour the Work"
- Mascot: The Duke
- National ranking: 15
- Newspaper: Ours (weekly newsletter); The Sentinel (student magazine)
- Yearbook: The Unicorn
- Alumni: Melbourne High School Old Boys
- Website: www.mhs.vic.edu.au

Melbourne High School is a government-funded single-sex academically selective secondary day school in the Melbourne suburb of South Yarra, Victoria, Australia. The school caters for boys from Year 9 to Year 12.

== History ==
Brains, not money, should be the passport to the higher realms of knowledge.

— Frank Tate

In 1905, Frank Tate, the first Director of Education, established Victoria's first state secondary school, the Melbourne Continuation School in the building in Spring Street that had housed the Model School. Until the opening of the Melbourne Continuation School, secondary education in Victoria was provided by non-government schools. The term "Continuation" was used to indicate the school would continue the education provided by government primary schools and to bypass legal blockages of government secondary education. Criticisms of the school were that it was to be secular, and it would not be single-sex.

The school was renamed Melbourne High School in 1912. In 1913, it reached capacity and senior students moved into a building in Victoria Street. By 1919 the Spring Street building was in poor condition and the Department of Education decided to split the school into separate single-sex schools. On the 3rd of October 1927, the boys moved to a new building in South Yarra which was named Melbourne Boys' High School. The girls remained in the building at Spring Street which was renamed Melbourne Girls' High School.

In 1930 the girls moved to the vacant Government House and in 1930 to State School No. 1689 in King Street. In 1934 they moved to a new building on Kings Way, Albert Park which, in recognition of a donation from Sir Macpherson Robertson, was named the Mac.Robertson Girls' High School.

In 1949, Melbourne Boys' High School was renamed Melbourne High School.

Joseph Hocking, an inspector of schools, was appointed as the first principal. Hocking's temporary assistant was Margery Fraser Robertson. In 1907 she became senior mistress and in 1909, the headmistress.

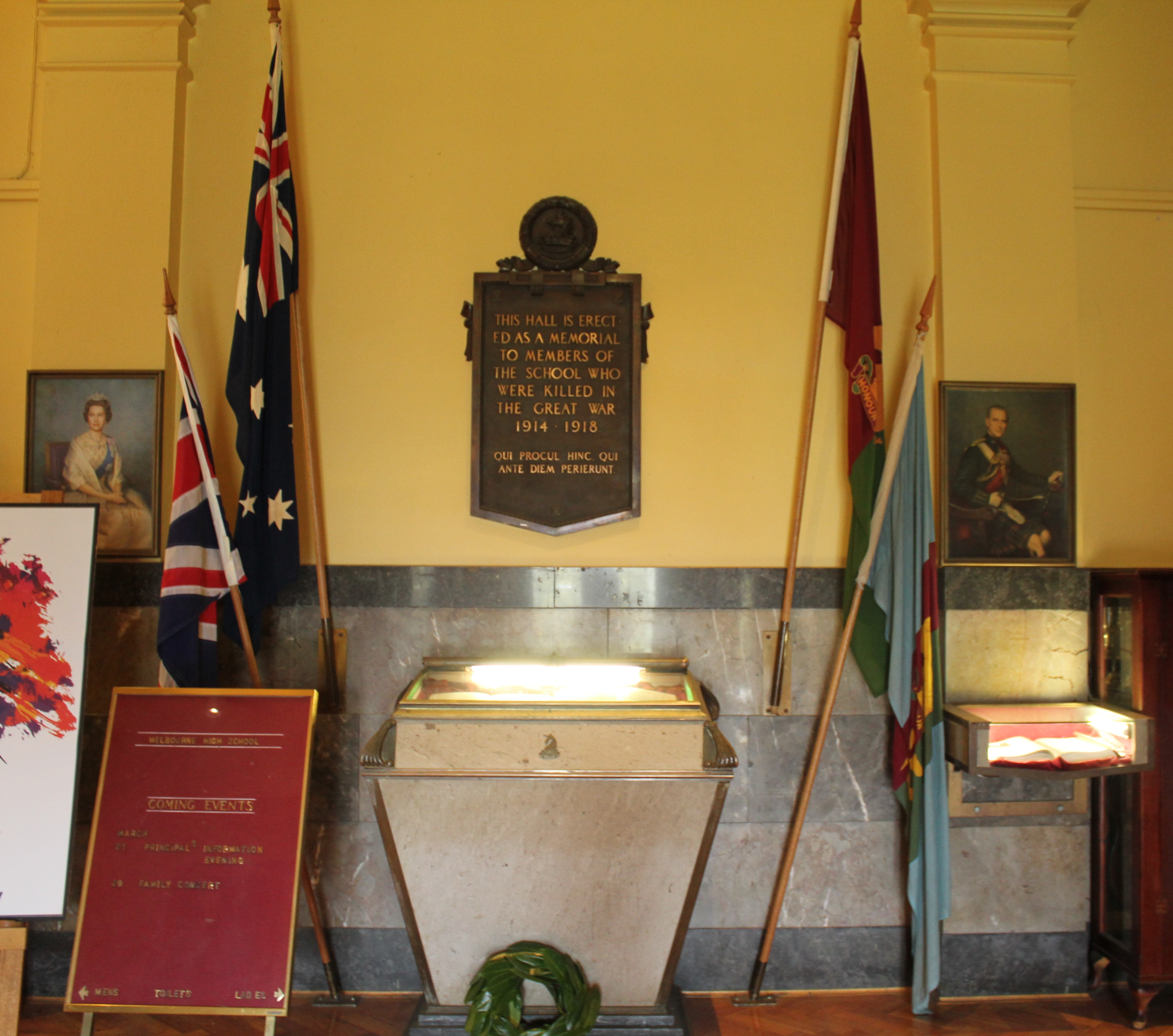
Memorial commemorating members of the school who were killed in World War I.

In 1910, the first sporting exchange with Adelaide High School occurred. This was later followed by an exchange with North Sydney Boys' High School. In 1914, the school's growth and development was disrupted by World War I, in which over 500 Melbourne High students served. The school has since developed a special association with Anzac Cove and has sent cadets and students to participate in ANZAC Day ceremonies.

Hocking spoke of the students as:

...so many upstanding, fearless-eyed Australians, full of the joy of life, physically fit and with mind-power and heart-power, duly exercised under favourable conditions

— Joseph Hocking

By 1919, it had the greatest number of students at Melbourne University (then Victoria's only university) from any school.

Old traditions in music and debating continued, with the addition of house chorals, which remains an important event in the school calendar.

New traditions emerged, such as a house system, with competition in various sports and debating. A Memorial Hall paid for by past students was a feature of the new school.

As had occurred in World War I, World War II greatly disrupted the school's proceedings. The school building was requisitioned by the Royal Australian Navy and the students moved to either the new Camberwell High School or the Tooronga Road State School. In 1944 students returned to Forrest Hill under the new principal Major-General (later Sir) Alan Ramsay. Ramsay was the first 'Old Boy', or former student, to become principal. Since then, all but two of his successors (Laurie Collins and Tony Mordini) have been Old Boys.

In the 1950s, Brigadier George Langley set about reviving the school, laying down plans for a swimming pool and physical education centre and reestablishing the Tecoma camp. The physical education centre and swimming pool opened in 1960 and in 1965, a new library was built. In 1968, portable classrooms were installed. In 1970, the Junior Science Block was opened.

In 1974 Molly Brennan applied to be principal. Despite making an appeal citing discrimination a less qualified man was appointed.

In the 1980s, the buildings needed refurbishment and new facilities were needed to meet the rapidly changing demands of a modern education, most notably the need for computers. Neville Drohan, principal from 1987 to 1991, combined government funding with donations from the school community to construct a new four-storey building: the 'Nineties' building (see facilities below).

In 1992, Raymond Willis became principal and in 1995 he oversaw a refurbishment of the original building and the addition of new rooms including a computer suite, dark room and an upgraded canteen. The original grass hockey field was replaced with a synthetic one and, next to the hockey field, two plexipave basketball courts were built.

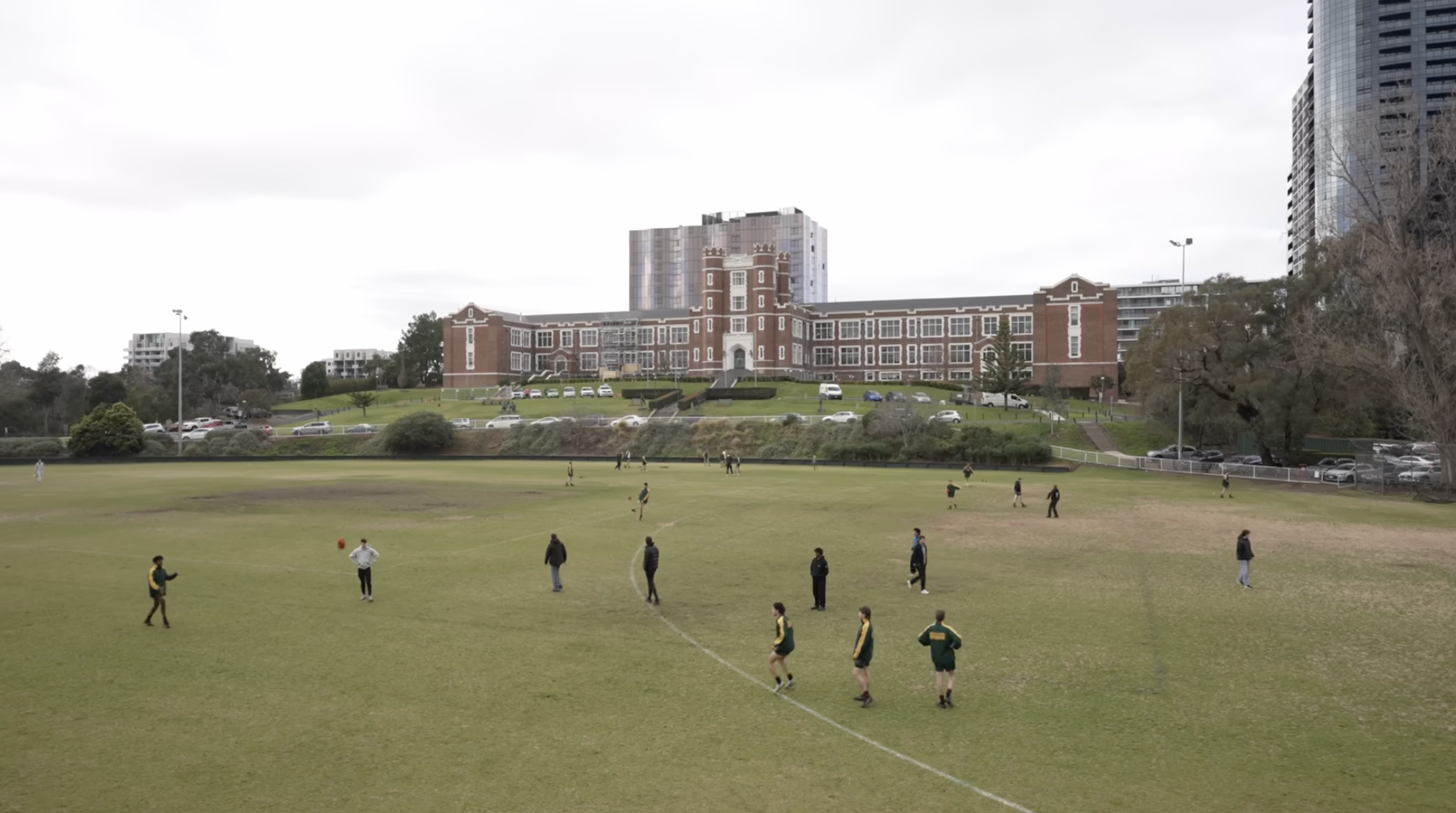
Woodfull-Miller Oval

The school oval was the next to be revamped. In 1999 new turf wickets which would be maintained by a curator were added, along with new drainage and watering as well as an upgrade to the lighting. The new oval was named the Woodfull-Miller Oval in honour of Bill Woodfull, a former student and principal, and Keith Miller, another former student, both highly regarded Australian Test cricketers.

Willis continued to upgrade the school's facilities with the construction of a cardio room in the Nineties building, and the addition of four junior science classrooms.

In 2002 the Army Cadets and Air Force Cadets received a new building which included orderly rooms, meeting rooms, seminar rooms, display areas, kitchen and toilets. In 2002, new change rooms were also constructed in the Old Boys Pavilion, along with the a hockey pavilion overlooking the synthetic hockey field.

The school increased its enrolment to 1,366. This meant a lower cutoff in the entrance exam, which led to the school's median ENTER dropping to second in the state. The median returned to first place in 2009 (see Academics).

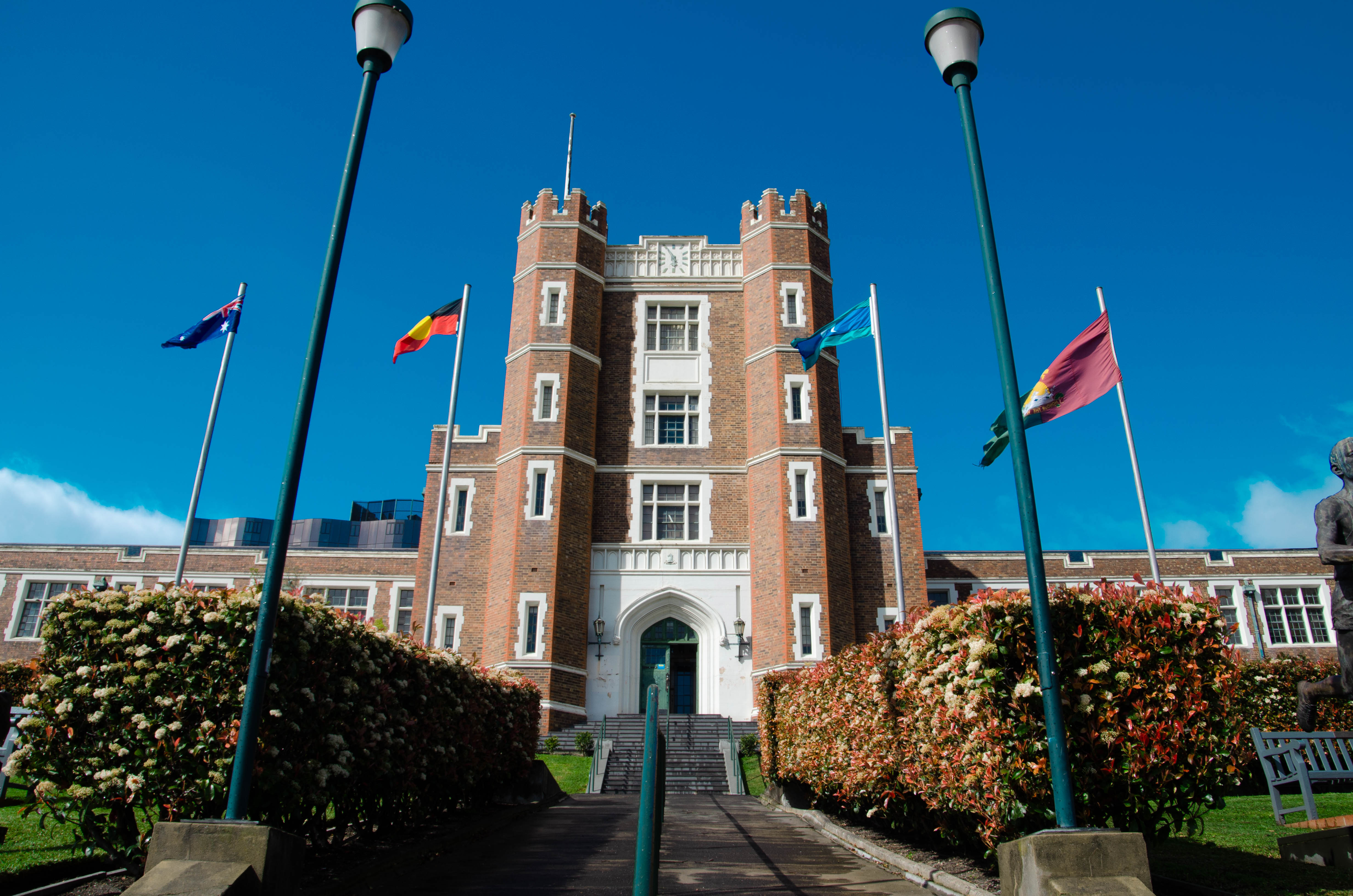
Front view of the Twenties Building as of 2024

Ray Willis died in July 2004 as the school's longest serving principal, at the time of his death.

In January 2005, Jeremy Ludowyke was appointed principal. In 2007 a new Arts Centre began construction and after nearly two years was officially opened by Lindsay Fox, a major donor and 'old boy' who had been asked to leave during his time as a student.

In 2007, Year 9 students were assigned to produce their own 'Citizenship Statement'. The results were collated to create an official 'MHS Citizenship Statement' that details the school's expectations of its students and now appears in the student planner.

The school admits that it is primarily seen as an academic school, but it also has a wide range of co-curricular traditions of music, with massed singing, formal assemblies and speech nights, intra and inter school sporting competitions, house choral competition, Army and Air Force cadet corps, and current affairs groups.

During the 2020–21 COVID-19 pandemic, Melbourne High, along with every other school in Victoria, shifted to online learning from week 9 of term 1. While senior school students (years 10, 11 and 12) returned temporarily at the end of term 2, the majority of the school remained in online learning for an unprecedented 16 school weeks. School Assessed Coursework (SACs), required for the VCE was conducted via proctorship and a large portion of unit 4 of all subjects were omitted from the study design to alleviate pressure. All extra-curricular activities, as well as many house events which are critical to school culture, did not run during this period.

In November 2020, Tony Mordini was appointed school principal.

In July 2024, the school proposed a mandate requiring all Year 11 students to complete at least one Humanities, Arts, or LOTE (Language Other Than English) subject. The move sparked immense student backlash and a petition arguing that the policy limits VCE flexibility and excludes Commerce subjects like Economics. The mandate was later scrapped.

In August 2026, principal Tony Mordini announced that he would be stepping down from his position to undertake a Principal Advisor role with the Department of Education.

== Academics ==
=== Enrolment ===
Melbourne High School is the only single-sex education selective state school for boys in Victoria which selects Year 9 students solely on the basis of performance in an entrance examination. Every year, over 1,400 apply to enter Year 9 for 336 places. These placements are based on their raw results in the entrance exam. Those who were within 5 marks of the cut-off-score or did not receive a place due to the "4% rule", which prevents more than 4% of another school's cohort entering Melbourne High, are eligible to apply in the Principal's Discretionary Category.

Usually 180 students are eligible to apply in this category and compete for 15 places. Students choosing to participate follow a complete application process involving:

- The submission of a portfolio demonstrating academic and co-curricular achievements;
- The student's most recent school report; and,
- A personal statement on why the student wishes to attend Melbourne High School.

A small number of students are then short-listed and interviewed. Places are also available in Year 10; in 2007, 28 students were accepted into Year 10; in 2008, 29 students were accepted after undergoing a similar process to the Principals Discretionary Category. Fewer places again are available at Year 11, these places being given based on an interview and application form. Year 11 enrollment is focused on the study of Arts and Humanities subjects, and students admitted in this category must study 2-3 subjects from this category. No further enrolment is available in Year 12.

The rules for entry are equal for all students during "examination entry" into the school. Students who live in nearby areas are not treated any differently from those from outer suburbs or regional areas.

The school also offers places via an arts and humanities intake, where students who can demonstrate an active interest in the arts and humanities can apply for entry at Year 11. Applicants are shortlisted then follow an interview process where they present their portfolio of work and present a statement on why they wish to attend Melbourne High School.

=== Academic results ===
Past students have achieved very strong results in the Victorian Certificate of Education (VCE) examinations. Over 99% of students pursue a tertiary education, and the school has the largest intake into Monash University and the University of Melbourne out of all schools.

Melbourne High School academic results
| Year | Median ENTER/ ATAR | % ENTER/ ATAR of 90 or more | % ENTER/ ATAR of 99 or more | Number of perfect ENTER/ ATAR scores of 99.95 | Number of perfect subject study scores of 50 |
|---|---|---|---|---|---|
| 2025 | 95.8 | 74.93 | 18.8 | 3 | 30 |
| 2024 | 95.45 | 71.89 | 19.3 | 4 | |
| 2020 | 94.8 | 68.69 | 15.5 | 4 | 24 |
| 2019 | 94.15 | 67.6 | 14.6 | 1 | 19 |
| 2018 | 95.10 | | | | 16 |
| 2017 | 94.15 | | | | 13 |
| 2016 | 95.15 | | | | 13 |
| 2015 | 95.40 | 72.10 | 16.02 | 0 | 19 |
| 2014 | 95.80 | 73.96 | 16.27 | 0 | 25 |
| 2013 | 95.45 | 75.97 | 13.69 | 2 | 21 |
| 2012 | 95.45 | 71.9 | 16.1 | 5 | 33 |
| 2011 | 94.25 | 70.7 | 12.2 | 3 | 32 |
| 2010 | 95.15 | 69.5 | 15.4 | 0 | 31 |
| 2009 | 95.85 | 75.0 | 19.0 | 3 | 40 |
| 2008 | 94.65 | 67.7 | 14.7 | 1 | 32 |
| 2007 | 95.35 | | 19.4 | 0 | 47 |
| 2006 | 95.35 | | 17.0 | 1 | 38 |
| 2005 | 94.70 | | 12.6 | 1 | 25 |
| 2004 | 94.40 | | 13.5 | 0 | 41 |
| 2003 | 93.85 | | 14.0 | 2 | 34 |
| 2002 | 94.60 | | 14.9 | 0 | 32 |
| 2001 | 95.00 | | 14.9 | 3 | 42 |
| 2000 | 94.10 | | 13.0 | - | 30 |
| 1999 | 94.30 | | 12.1 | - | 31 |
| 1998 | 94.20 | | 13.0 | - | 36 |

== Grounds, buildings, and facilities ==
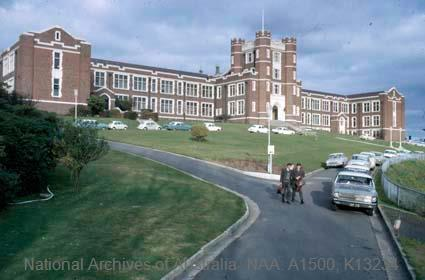
The Twenties Building in 1965

Melbourne High School has one campus, in South Yarra. This campus is split into five building blocks. These are: the Twenties Building (built in 1927, refurbished in 1995), the Nineties Building (built in 1992), the Round Building, the Junior Science Block (built in the 1970s) and the Arts Studies Centre (built in 2008).

The Twenties Building is a heritage-listed, three-storey rendered brick building in the Collegiate Gothic style, which is known as the "Castle on the Hill" due to its appearance and location. The bottom level contains the school canteen, the dining hall (with microwaves and a rowing boat and canoe hanging inside), two IT rooms and four rooms devoted to mathematics. The ground level serves multiple purposes. The south wing of the ground floor generally functions as geography and mathematics rooms. The north wing of the ground floor is devoted to physics with two large classrooms and a lecture room with raked seating. Between the north and south wings is the school's Memorial Hall, the principal's office and the offices of the assistant principals. The first floor is also split into two wings with the south wing assigned to history, LOTE and politics and the north wing assigned to chemistry. The balcony of the Memorial Hall is also accessible from the first floor, as are the Student Learning Coordinators' offices. An additional flight of stairs leads to the Alan Middleton Conference Room, used for formal meetings and interviews, and the John Elden Heritage Room, home to the School's Heritage Society. These rooms were formerly used for classes, but were repurposed, refurbished and specialised due to their gradual disrepair. The top of the castle is also accessible via these stairs, but is not ordinarily open for students.

The Nineties Building has four floors. The ground and first floors house the South Yarra Sports Centre which provides facilities to the public and students. The ground floor has a gym, basketball courts and a swimming pool, and the first floor has a weights room and a cardio room. The second floor has rooms used for biology, commerce related subjects and music. The third floor is used for English and also houses the school library, which was previously in the R Building.

The Science Block consists of four science labs split over two levels. These science rooms are generally used only for Year 9 and Year 10 general science, with other rooms being used for the more specific and specialised VCE subjects of chemistry, physics and biology.

The Arts Studies Centre began construction in 2007 and was completed by 2008. This building was largely funded by Lindsay Fox, whose gargoyle is installed on the building. It consists of four floors, each containing multiple rooms devoted to the visual and performing arts. These also contain computers and media rooms.

The school's grounds include a hockey field and pavilion, tennis courts, the Woodfull-Miller Oval, cricket nets, netball courts, basketball courts, the 'Old Boys Pavilion' and the Cadet HQ. Other features include a portable classroom east of the Art Building (typically used for mathematics), shipping containers near the Art building and oval, a stairway to Alexandra Parade and a small garden north of the Twenties Building.

Since the 2010s, the areas around the school have been undergoing higher density development, with multi-storey towers being constructed nearby.

In 2026, it was found that the nearly century-old Twenties Building had fallen into disrepair. The Victorian State Building Authority investigated the building and found thousands of defects, such as flaking lead paint and water leakage. Minor faults were also found in the newer Nineties Building and Arts Studies Centre. In November 2026, the School was granted $10 million in government funding to help refurbishment efforts. In 2027, students will be moved into modular buildings on the School's hockey field while the Twenties Building undergoes major works.

Photos from the first half of the 20th century

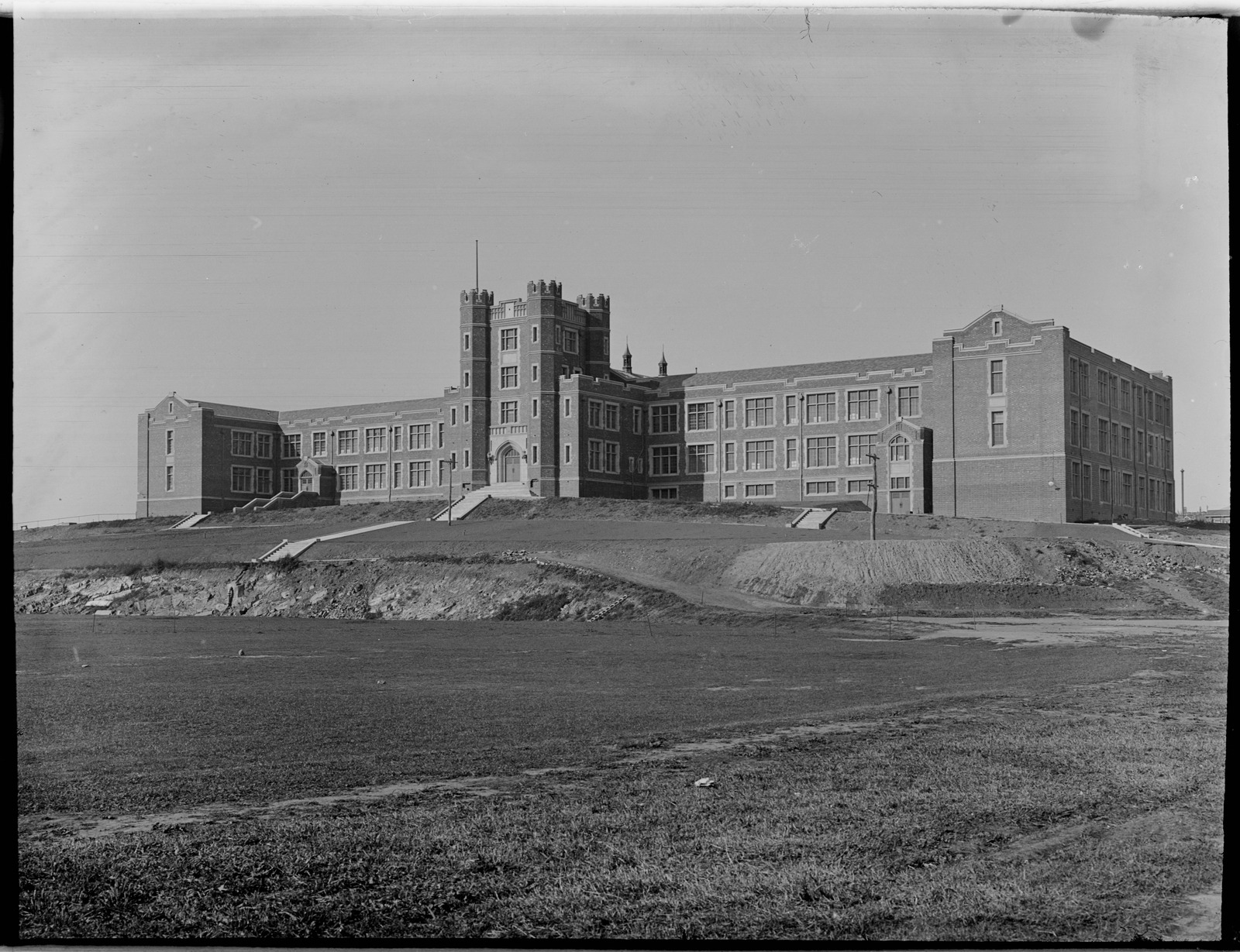
The 'castle on the hill'

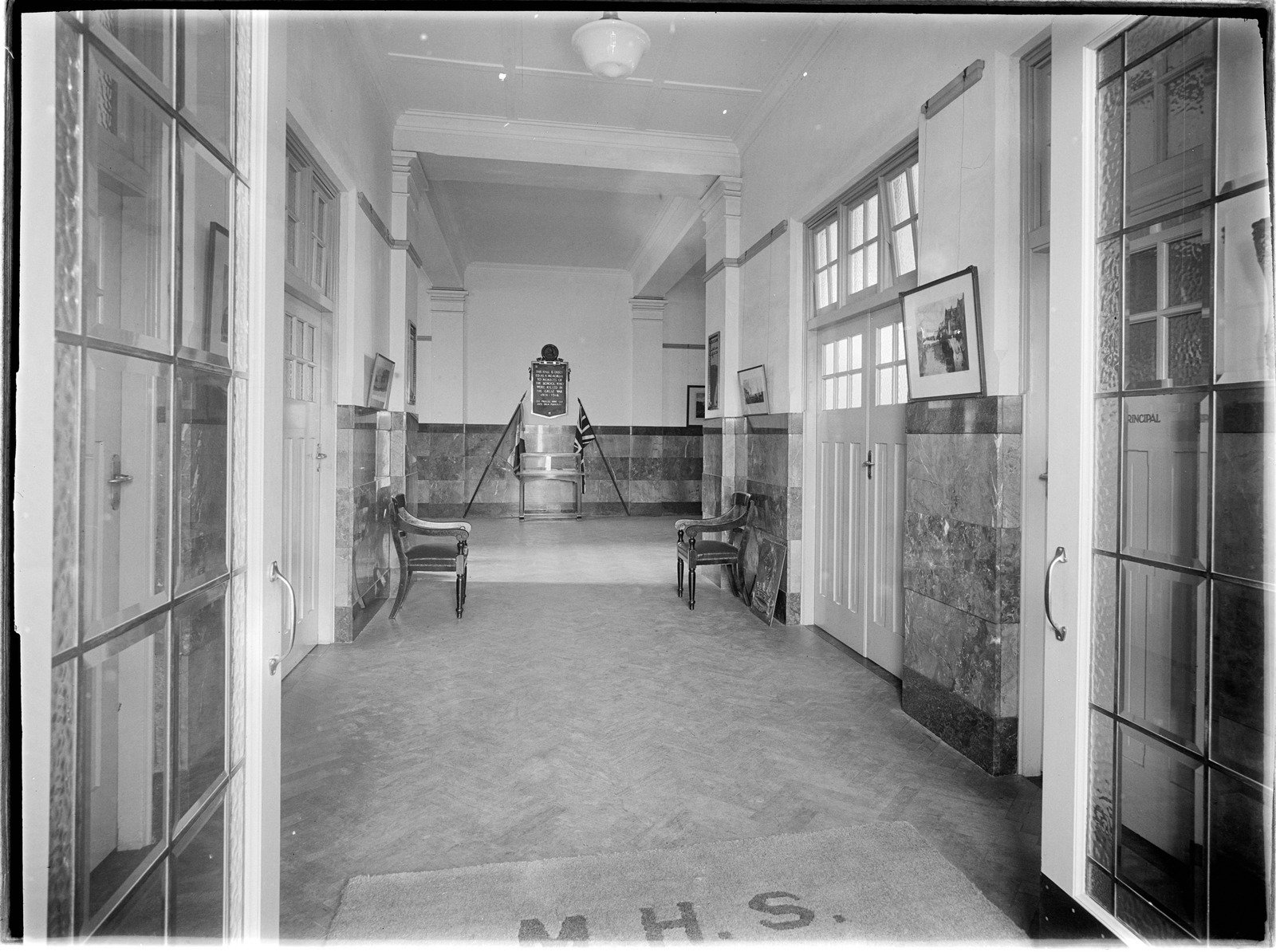
Main entrance

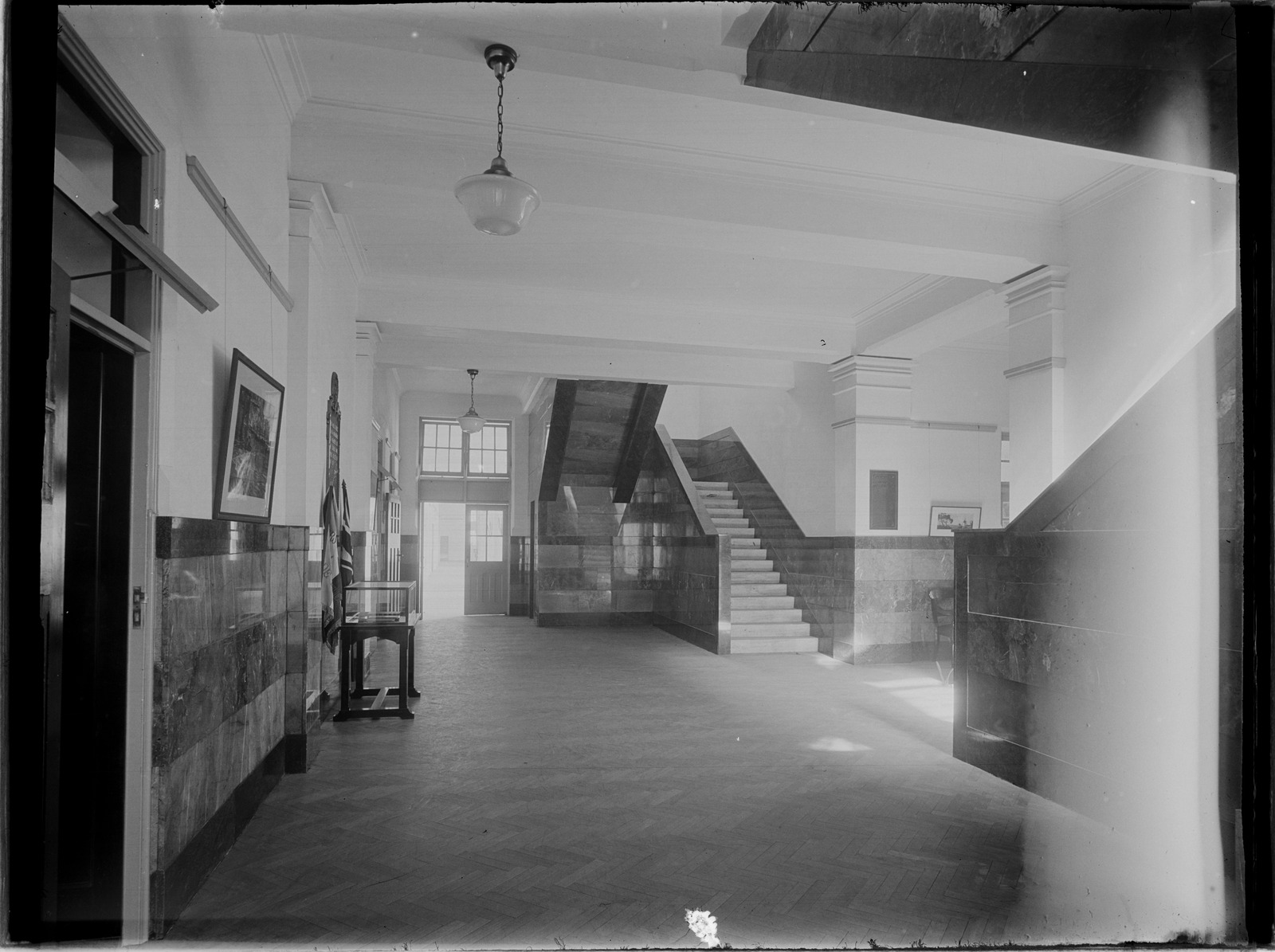
Foyer interior

== Culture and student life ==
The junior school comprises students in Years 9 and 10. There are four junior school captains. Students in the junior school are not subject to the pressures of VCE and are encouraged to participate in extracurricular activities and broaden their education. Year 10 students are required to complete twenty hours of community service throughout the year as a mandatory requirement to continue their education at Melbourne High into year 11. Year 9 students have one elective a term, however, they may only select one elective as philosophy is mandatory in Year 9. In Year 10, students have four electives through the year but only three slots available to fill as economics is a mandatory subject. Both Year 9 and 10 students are expected to study a language other than English, starting in Year 9 and continuing the same language into Year 10.

The senior school comprises students in Years 11 and Year 12. There is one School Captain and a Vice-Captain. At the end of the year, Year 11 students nominate for various leadership positions, including positions in the SRC Leadership team and House leadership team. House captains and SRC presidents are determined by voting from the student body following a period of speech-making.

=== House competition ===
Interhouse competitions remain an integral part of the school's ethos. The four Houses with their associated colours are:

- Forest (blue)
- Waterloo (green)
- Como (yellow)
- Yarra (red)

The names for the houses were derived from the local history of the area. The hill upon which the school is situated was first settled by Captain Charles Forrest, who built his house, Waterloo Cottage, on the Como Estate alongside the Yarra River. Forrest won the inaugural cockhouse cup in 1928.

If a student entering the school has a relative who was (or is) at Melbourne High, the student is allocated to the same house as their relative.

The houses compete in four major competitions:

- Swimming

Always the first event of the year, this event features students from each of the four age groups competing in a number of events at the Melbourne Sports and Aquatic Centre's Commonwealth games. The event runs over one full day, with each event containing two students from each house. For the individual events, points are awarded from first place through to fourth, giving houses the opportunity to break ahead if they were to have both competitors in the top four. There are four 50m relays for each age group which are progressively are less valuable, but still pivotal in the final calculations for champion. There are also 200m relays and medleys. Extra points are awarded for breaking school records. A group champion is named from each age group. Based on points awarded, swimming is the least valuable of the four major competitions, with first place scoring 80 points, second 64, third 56 and fourth 48.

- Chorals

The chorals involves the entire school in one day at the Melbourne Town Hall. It is preceded by the Instrumentals Competition, which is not a major competition, although it is one of the most important minor competitions. The chorals competition features three pieces sung by each house: a set song, a free choice, and a special choir song. The special choir consists of between 8–20 members of the house while the set song and free choice are sung by the whole house. Rehearsals are held at recess and lunchtimes in the school's memorial hall and are generally coordinated by student leaders in the house. There is also a special choir event that sings in harmonies and more complex songs. The winner of the House Chorals competition is awarded 100 points, second 80, third 70 and fourth 60.

The most recent competition (2026) ended with results: 1st: Yarra, 2nd: Como, 3rd: Waterloo, 4th: Forrest.

- Athletics

The third major event of the year, the athletics competition has for several years been held over two days at Olympic Park Stadium, however in 2010 it was held on the school oval due to the Melbourne & Olympic Parks precinct redevelopment. More recently, the competition has been held at Lakeside Stadium, though in 2020, the athletics competition was again held on the school oval due to the COVID-19 pandemic. The first day largely comprises heats and C, D, E and F relays (as with swimming, the A relay is the most valuable and the F relay the least). The second day contains a large number of finals. Currently, the heats are not worth any points. In the past, the heats were worth very few points, so the second day could make or break a house's chances. The second day also features A and B relays. Other individual events include the 1500 m walk, the 3000m race and the 2000m steeplechase. These three events are open to all age groups. All other individual events are run within age groups. Both track and field events are competed in. The winner of the Athletics competition is awarded 90 points, second 70, third 60 and fourth 50 points towards the Derrimut Cup.

- Cross Country

The cross country competition closes off the house competition and is generally the decider as the Derrimut Cup reaches its finale. Most of the school runs 5 km around Albert Park Lake in their year levels. All positions are counted from 1st to 250th in each age group with four points being awarded for the house year group in first place, while last place receives one point. House year group points are added together to get the eventual winner of the House Cross Country. Where two houses are equal on points, the winner will be decided by the house with the highest percentage of participants (across all age groups) who have completed the course. This generally means that the house with the greatest participation wins. Waterloo ended its own cross country winning streak in 2017, losing to Como. The winner of the Cross Country competition is awarded 100 points, second 80, third 70 and fourth 60. The cross country competition was not held in 2020 due to the COVID-19 Pandemic.

They also compete in minor competitions:

- Australian Football (Junior and Senior, counted as two events)
- Basketball (Junior and Senior, counted as two events)
- Debating (Junior and Senior, Australasian/DAV style counted as one event)
- Hockey
- Football (soccer) (Junior and Senior, counted as one event)
- Theatre Sports (Junior and Senior, counted as one event)
- Volleyball
- Water Polo
- Instrumentals – one of the most hotly contested minors, the entire school watches the instrumental competition, which features around 150 students across the year levels. The competition is structured so that each house presents two soloists and one ensemble performance, each of which are judged by the same three adjudicators that judged the Chorals, and the points are tallied to find the winner. The most recent competition (2025) had the results: 1st: Forrest, 2nd: Yarra, 3rd: Waterloo, 4th: Como.
- Year 9 Derrimut Round Robin – in which the new Year 9s can pick to play a particular sport out of a wide array of sports for their house and participate in round-robin against the other houses. The main focus of the competition is to make the new Year 9s involved with their houses.

In 2020, the Cockhouse Cup was renamed to the "Derrimut" House Competition. The competition is named after Derrimut, leader of the Yalukit-willam clan of the Boonwurrung peoples.

=== Music program ===
Melbourne High School offers a music program. The school has a compulsory massed singing program for students in Year 9 and Year 10. Year 9 students also complete a semester of classroom music. The Music Department also offers a number of electives at Year 10 level in Music Craft, Music Technology, Film Music and Music Composition. At VCE level, the department currently offers VCE Music: Group Performance and VCE Music: Solo Performance. This is complemented with an instrumental tuition program on the school's campus.

=== Sport program ===
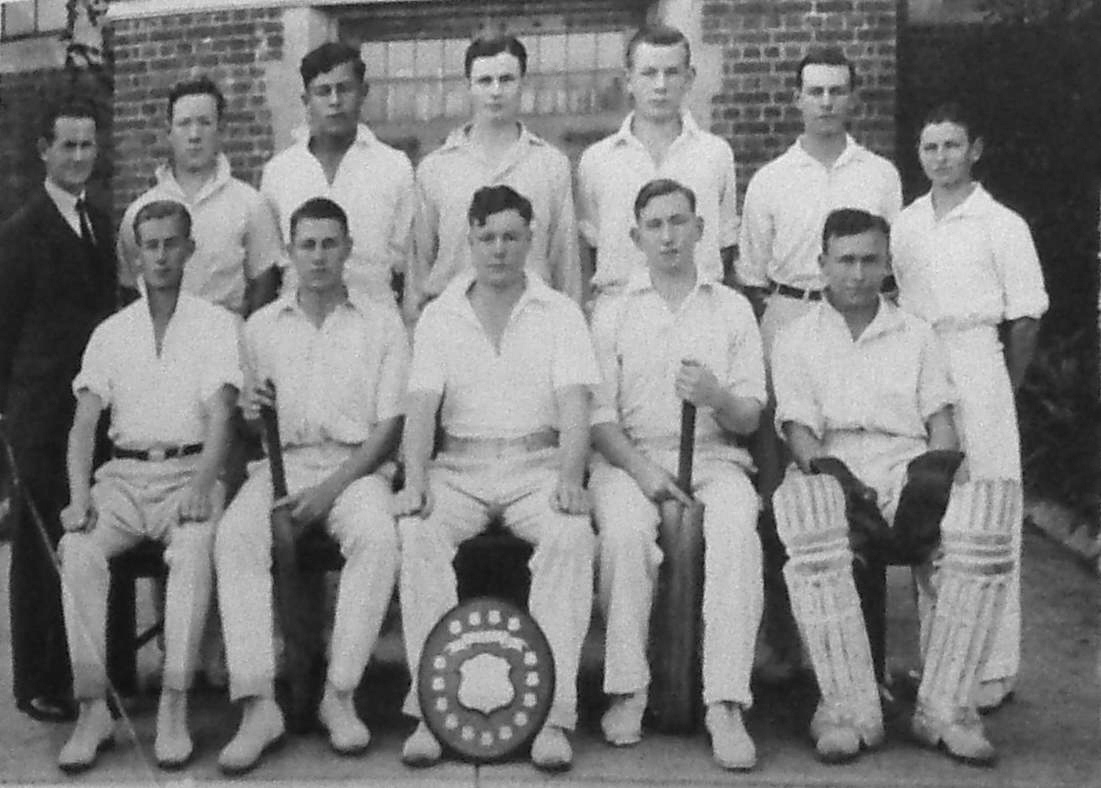
Photograph of the Melbourne High School cricket team from 1934, Keith Miller is standing on the right, team captain Keith Truscott is seated with the shield

Each term students choose a sport to play during a double period once a week. The sports to choose from include rowing, sailing, cricket, football, rugby, tennis, water polo, golf, squash, cross country running, lacrosse, badminton, lawn bowls, yoga, fencing, soccer, futsal and swimming.

The school participates in 23 different interschool sports through School Sport Victoria (SSV). Sports teams such water polo, cricket and rowing can also participate in national and international competitions.

The school's performance in sports continues to change. In the past its strengths were in Australian Rules Football, winning all senior VSSSA Australian football titles between 1988 and 1996, and tennis, where Melbourne High won five titles between 1989 and 1995. However, the student demographic has changed and more than 90% of students are from East Asian or South Asian background, this strength in football has been replaced by better performances in table tennis and badminton. At the end of 2009, Melbourne High had won the senior VSSSA badminton competition three times in four years, the senior table tennis competition nine times in ten years and the intermediate table tennis competition for five years in a row. The school has also done well in Cross Country, winning five VSSSA age group titles in three years.

The school also has a tradition of hockey performance, and the MHSOBA uses the school's synthetic turf hockey field for its own senior and junior clubs. The school's team has won the VSSSA crown seven times in the last nine years. A similar tradition involving the MHSOBA exists with the school's cricket teams, which have been consistently competitive, winning six VSSSA titles over the twenty-year history of the competition.

The First XI cricket team has played matches against the Victorian Governor's XI which in 2008 included Merv Hughes. The school's cricketing history led to a visit in 2009 from avid cricket fan and media personality Sir Michael Parkinson.

=== Leadership program ===
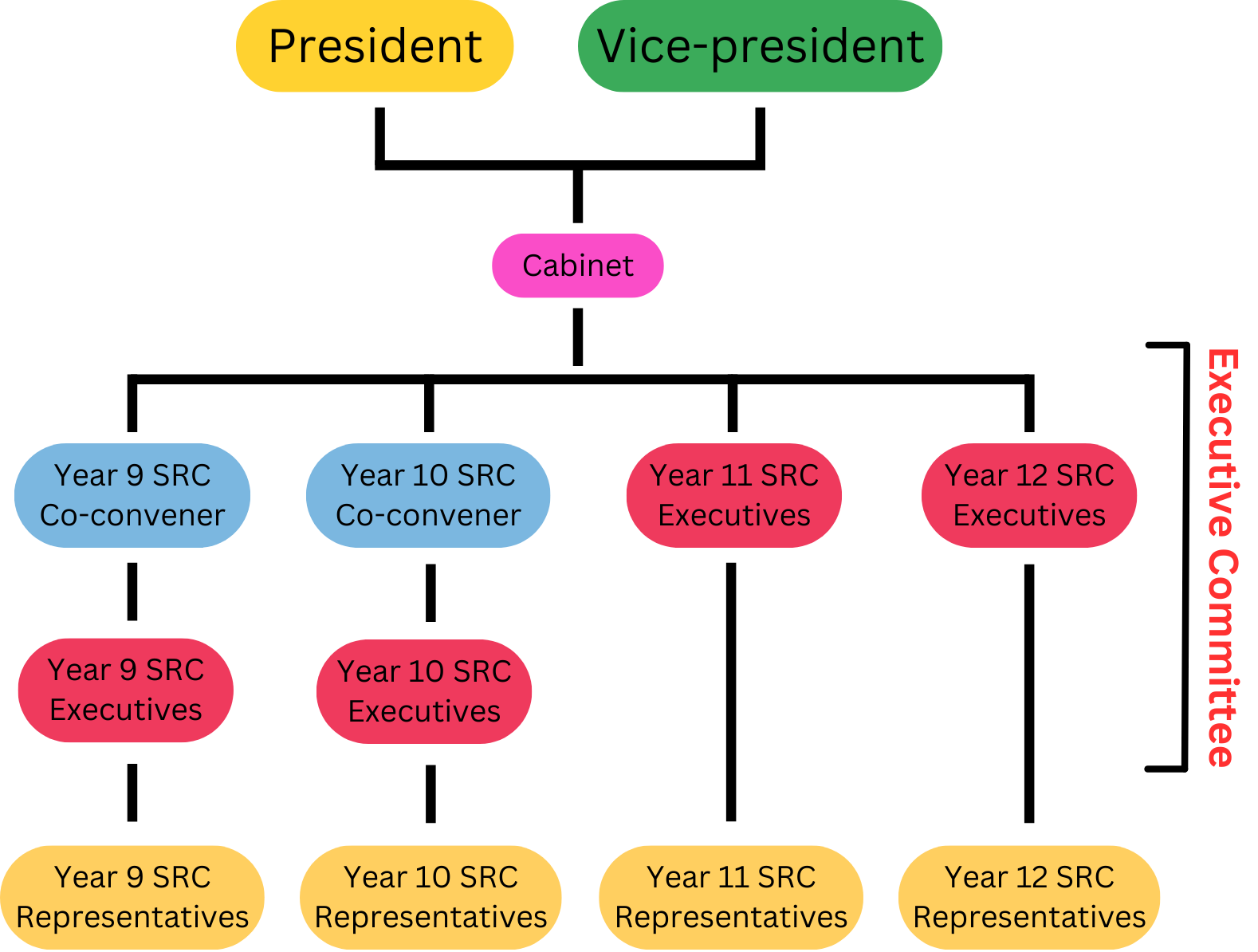
Structure of the MHS SRC

Melbourne High School has a number of leadership opportunities integrated into its leadership program. The school has four Junior School Captains (all in year 10), a School Captain and a School Vice Captain. These positions are selected in the tail end of the year through a process of application and an interview with the principal and assistant principal.

Melbourne High School also employs a Student Representative Council (SRC). The SRC serves to advocate and promote student voice and wellbeing, and in addition, organises student initiated events such as socials, formals and inter-form competitions in games such as dodgeball or soccer.

The SRC comprises the President, Vice-President, cabinet members, year-level executives and year-level representatives. The roles of president, vice-president along with the year-level executives are voted in through campaigns where they must run in pairs (with the exception of Year 9 Executives and Representatives, which are selected via a beuraucratic application process). The following roles are then decided at the discretion of the SRC president and vice-president.

Many involvements, including such as the Global Issues Education group, Political Interest Group, Food Interest Group and Model United Nations Student Association (MUNSA) (see below) have presidents or captains. Most sporting teams also have captains. Within the Cadet Units, there are a series of leadership positions offered to students who completed particular promotion courses over the holidays. There are also leaders in the form of the Year 11 Mentoring Program and the Millgrove Outdoor Education Center leaders.

Student leaders are often distinguishable from the rest of the students. Most leaders (apart from form captains and SRC representatives, who wear coloured badges) are distinguished through an embroidery sewn onto their blazer pocket. The School Captain and SRC President is further distinguished through the sewing of a golden wreath around the Unicorn of their blazer pocket, whilst the School Vice-Captain and SRC Vice-president have a green wreath around the Unicorn of their blazer pocket. The house captains have a small coloured trim representing their house sewn onto the pocket, Other leadership positions can also be distinguished through badges specific to those positions (Though some badges are simply given to participants of certain student-initiated involvement groups).

=== Involvement program ===
The school has a program of student-run clubs, societies and special interest groups. It is compulsory for new Year 9 students to be involved in some of these groups. The school has 52 recognised involvements, groups and societies Some of the major involvements that have been integral in Melbourne High's history are Army Cadets, Air Force Cadets, Chorale, Debating, Instrumental Ensembles and Rowing. Other clubs and societies that exist include educationally themed ones such as the Political Interest Group, the Commerce Club, Astronomy club, IT Programming club, Model United Nations Student Association, Global Issues Education, Strategic Reasoning Club and Heritage Society as well as recreational ones such as The Sentinel (a satire student magazine) and the Railway Interest Group. Students pursuing similar interests may gather together and form a new group of their own, subject to the approval of the school's administration.

The Political Interest Group has had speakers ranging from Federal Treasurer Peter Costello, to Prime Ministers Kevin Rudd and Julia Gillard, Deputy Premier Ben Carroll and Cardinal George Pell. Other clubs have had similarly prominent guest speakers, such as the Railway Interest Group having brought in Transport Minister Gabrielle Williams, History club having brought in Premiers Steve Bracks and John Brumby and the Commerce Club having the secretary of the Department of Treasury and Finance (Victoria) and other industry leaders.

== Awards, badges, and prizes ==
There are School Colours for both Service and Sport. Both are in the form of ties, with a design consisting of the standard MHS tie's stripes and a unicorn at the bottom for Half Colours; and the tie stripe alternating with unicorns for Full Colours. The Unicorns on Sport Colours ties are coloured gold; the ones on Service Colours are silver.

In addition to the tie, Full Colour recipients as well as holders of some leadership positions can have their blazer emblazoned with their award or position. Position titles are embroidered above the school emblem on the blazer pocket whilst award titles are embroidered below. A system of badges is also employed at Melbourne High School (for house captains, SRC executives, class SRC representatives, high academic achievers, form captains and for various clubs).

The Melbourne High School Speech Night features the awarding of various prizes to particular students for performance in academic subjects, co-curricular achievements or sporting feats. The academic prizes are determined by using data delivered through internal testing of VCE students. There is one academic prize for every subject, as well as a prize for Pure Science and scientific enquiry. The sporting prizes are chosen by the heads of a particular sport to reward the individual deemed to have made the greatest contribution to that sport during their time at Melbourne High. The co-curricular prizes are similarly chosen. In addition, there are prizes for 'Best All-rounder' and 'Sports Champion'.

== Brother and sister schools ==
Melbourne High maintains close ties with its counterpart the Mac.Robertson Girls' High School. Each year the schools join for the Winter Concert performed at either the Melbourne Town Hall or Hamer Hall, as well as a musical or theatre production performed in either the school's memorial hall, the mini-theatre room in the Arts building, or the Mac.Rob hall. Recently a light-hearted Melbourne High vs Mac.Rob Cup begun to take place which includes events such as debating, netball, soccer and theatre sports.

The school also holds events with the other selective entry schools within Melbourne. These include Nossal High School, Suzanne Cory High School and John Monash Science School and University High School. Traditionally, the school hosts a leadership summit for the Student Representative Councils of Mac.Robertson Girls' High School, Nossal High School and Suzanne Cory High School. Similarly, the SRCs hold the annual SENS (Selective Entry Network Schools) cup for Year 10 students, a friendly competition in various sports which are nominated and hosted at each respective school, as well as the annual SENS Maths Games Day.

=== Exchanges ===
Sister school relationships have been established internationally with high schools in Japan (Kasukabe High School), Germany (Albert-Schweitzer-Gymnasium Gundelfingen), Indonesia (SMAN 4 Denpasar), Hong Kong (Queen's College) and France (Lycée Branly Amiens, Pertuis). Annual exchanges occur with each of the sister schools, giving students the opportunity to experience both the culture and education system of another country. Each year Melbourne High either sends a group of students overseas to these schools, or hosts students from these schools. There are also opportunities for individual students to go on a longer term exchange overseas.

=== Crawford Shield and Prefects Cup ===
Melbourne High has annual sporting contests against North Sydney Boys High School and Adelaide High School during which boys from the visiting school are billeted with host families.

The annual competition between North Sydney and Melbourne began in 1959, when a North Sydney cricket team visited Melbourne for a one-day match in October. In subsequent years the game was increased to two days and the date changed to March so that final year boys could more easily take part. the competition was first expanded in 1969 when, at the team of the Melbourne principal, North Sydney sent a water polo and swimming team to Melbourne in company with the cricketers. During the visit, it was agreed that the water polo fixture should become a permanent part of the exchange. In 1971, former Test cricket captain Allan Border played on the school oval in the North Sydney team. Also in 1971, squash and tennis were included in the program and athletics was added in 1972. Furthermore, the Crawford Shield was officially inaugurated in 1972. Chess was included for the first time in 1975, and in 1976 golf and debating teams also competed. Basketball was introduced in 1979. Lawn bowls and table tennis were added in 1990 and sailing and fencing in 1992. Rowing was contested in 1993 and netball was introduced in 1998. Futsal replaced netball in 2004. The Crawford Shield is awarded to the overall winner from these events. As of 2025, chess, basketball, tennis, music, cricket, volleyball, futsal, water polo, debating and table tennis were contested

Melbourne High competes against Adelaide High annually, typically in August. Football, hockey, rowing, badminton, basketball, cross country, debating, soccer, table tennis, tennis, theatre sports, and volleyball are contested for the Prefects' Cup. The Prefects' Cup has been held since 1910. As Adelaide High School is coeducational, the MacRobertson Girls' High School also competes, although their performance against the girls of Adelaide High has no bearing on the Prefects' Cup.

== School tradition ==
The school motto is "Honour The Work". The school motto was derived spontaneously from an address to the assembled school by the late Frank Tate MA, a former director of education, in the course of which he quoted the words of Edward Thring. The song is sung at the start of all school assemblies and other school gatherings such as speech nights. On normal occasions only the first two verses are sung, however on special occasions, such as ANZAC Day, the third verse is also sung.

== Principals ==
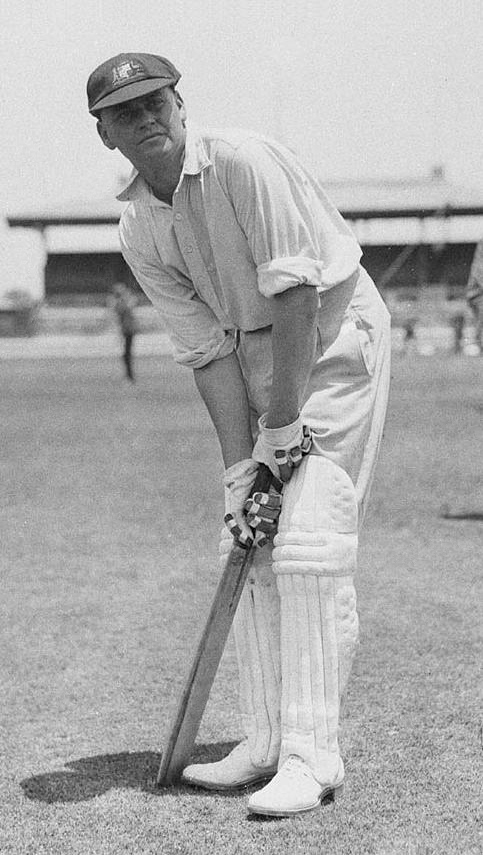
Bill Woodfull, Melbourne High School Old Boy, Australian national cricket team captain and later principal of Melbourne High School from 1956 to 1962

The following individuals have served as Principal, or any precedent title, of Melbourne High School:

| Ordinal | Officeholder | Term start | Term end | Time in office | Notes |
|---|---|---|---|---|---|
| 1 | Joseph Hocking | 1912 | 1923 | 10–11 years | |
| 2 | Claude Searby | 1923 | 1934 | 10–11 years | |
| 3 | James Hill | 1934 | 1943 | 8–9 years | |
| 4 | Major-General Alan Ramsay CBE, DSO, CB, MSM, ED^{[note §]} | 1943 | 1949 | 5–6 years | |
| 5 | Brigadier George Langley DSO, OStJ, SOWE^{[note §]} | 1949 | 1956 | 6–7 years | |
| 6 | William "Bill" Woodfull OBE^{[note §]} | 1956 | 1962 | 5–6 years | |
| 7 | Frederic Wells^{[note §]} | 1963 | 1963 | 0 years | |
| 8 | Edward Thompson^{[note §]} | 1964 | 1969 | 4–5 years | |
| 9 | Laurence Collins | 1970 | 1975 | 4–5 years | |
| 10 | Lou Barberis^{[note §]} | 1975 | 1986 | 10–11 years | |
| 11 | Neville Drohan^{[note §]} | 1987 | 1991 | 3–4 years | |
| 12 | Raymond Winston George Willis^{[note §]} | 1992 | 2004 | 11–12 years | |
| 13 | Jeremy Brian Ludowyke^{[note §]} | 2005 | 2020 | 14–15 years | |
| 14 | Dr. Tony Mordini | 2021 | 2026 | 4–5 years | |

^[note §]: denotes an alumnus of Melbourne High School.

== Melbourne High School Old Boys ==
Those who have left the school are known as 'Old Boys' and many join the Melbourne High School Old Boys Association (MHSOBA). The Association was founded in 1907, and has been in continuous operation since then.

The Association raises funds to support the school's activities and supports students with scholarships for tertiary studies. The MHSOBA has cricket, football, hockey and waterpolo clubs. These institutions have played their part in the production of notable Australian sportspeople, including cricketers Keith Miller and Bill Woodfull as well as a number of champion AFL footballers that includes three members of the Australian Football Hall of Fame, three Brownlow medalists, seven team-of-the-century members, eight captains, fourteen All-Australian selectees, and twenty-one best and fairest award recipients such as David Parkin, Garry Lyon and Cameron Bruce. The old Central School admission system provided some who rose, but two clubs were within two kilometres walk, and another club about four kilometres, and appropriate arrangements were made for their best education. The MHSOBA organises reunions which occur every five years, maintaining contact between Melbourne High alumni.

As a school that prides itself on academic success, Melbourne High School has produced individuals who have played a major role in research, government, economics and finance including Nobel laureate for medicine Sir John Eccles, who was awarded his prize for his research on the synapse. Melbourne High School students have also contributed to arts and culture. The school has produced a number of best-selling authors including Graeme Base the author of the Animalia series, Raimond Gaita a renowned author/philosopher, and Brett King, a respected author and innovator in the banking industry. The male members of the Australian band The Seekers – Athol Guy, Keith Potger and Bruce Woodley – the creators of the now folk song I Am Australian, also attended Melbourne High School, as did two finalists in the popular reality television show Australian Idol in Thanh Bui and Dean Geyer. Geyer also played Brodie Roberts in the hit TV Show Glee. There are photographs of many notable Old Boys on walls in the school's corridors in the Distinguished Old Boys gallery.

== Cultural references ==
Melbourne High School featured on Thank God You're Here on Wednesday, 27 May 2009, where the name of the school was replaced with Kevington Grammar but footage was taken of the school building and school students.

Steven Spielberg's World War Two miniseries The Pacific, the follow-up to Band of Brothers, featured some footage of Melbourne High School, shot in December 2007.

On 13 August 2010, the Year 12 students had their formal crashed by singer Katy Perry and DJ Ruby Rose.

Lili Wilkinson's YA novel Pink is set in "The Billy Hughes School for Academic Excellence", a thinly veiled amalgamation of Melbourne High School and Mac.Robertson Girls High School and is based on the author's own experience of school theatre at the schools.

2026 coming-of-age comedy film A Day for Losers, starring Jacob Sartorius, Dakota Lotus and Benji Krol, was filmed at Melbourne High School.

== See also ==
- List of government schools in Victoria, Australia
- Australian Army Cadets
- Australian Air Force Cadets

== Notes ==
- Who's Who of boys' school rankings: 1. Scotch College, Melbourne, 2. Melbourne Grammar School, 3. Melbourne High School, 4. Geelong Grammar School, 5. Sydney Boys High School, 6. Wesley College, 7. Shore, 8. Fort Street Boys' High, 9. North Sydney Boys High School, 10. Sydney Grammar School
