= Melbourne Continuation School =

First public secondary school in Victoria, Australia

Coordinates: 37°48′32″S 144°58′21″E

The Melbourne Continuation School was Victoria's first government secondary school. It was the initiative of Director of Education Frank Tate and opened on 15 February 1905 in the building in Spring Street, Melbourne that had been occupied by the National Model and Training School. The building was demolished in 1933 and the site became the home of the Royal Australasian College of Surgeons. The inaugural principal was Joseph Hocking.

== Secondary state education ==
Until the opening of the Melbourne Continuation School, secondary education in Victoria had been provided by non-government schools. The term "Continuation" was used to indicate the school would continue the education provided by government primary schools and to bypass legal blockages of government secondary education. Criticisms of the school were that it was to be secular, and it would not be single-sex. The school was renamed Melbourne High School in 1912.

In 1913, the school reached capacity and senior students were relocated to a building in Victoria Street. By 1919 the Spring Street building was in poor condition and the Department of Education decided to split the school into separate single-sex schools. In October 1927 the boys moved to a new building in South Yarra and the girls remained at Spring Street. The new schools were named Melbourne Boys' High School and Melbourne Girls' High School.

In 1931 the girls moved to the vacant Government House and in 1933 to State School No. 1689 in King Street. In 1934, they moved to a new building which had been constructed on the north-east corner of Albert Park Reserve with the help of a donation from Sir Macpherson Robertson. The new girls' school was named the Mac.Robertson Girls' High School.

In 1949, Melbourne Boys' High School was renamed Melbourne High School.

== Notable students ==
- Ellen Balaam, the first woman surgeon in Melbourne
