= Reports on the Education of the Lower Orders =

Historically Important 2nd Ever Select Committee Report on Education

Select Committee of Inquiry on the Education of the Lower Orders (1816–1818)
- by order of the Parliament of the United Kingdom of Great Britain and Ireland

Inquiry overview
- Formed: 1816
- Preceding Inquiry: Education in Ireland (1809–1812)
- Dissolved: 1818
- Superseding Inquiry: The Select Committee of Inquiry into the present state of the Education of the People in England and Wales and into the application and effects of the Grant made by Parliament for the erection of Schools (1834)
- Jurisdiction: Expanded from London to England & Wales then Great Britain
- Key document: Reports on the Education of the Lower Orders (1816–1819)

The Reports on the Education of the Lower Orders were published between 1816 and 1819 by a select committee of the House of Commons (Parliament of the United Kingdom) under the chairmanship of Henry Brougham. The committee made only the second ever government inquiry into education, as it comprehensively investigated the provision of education for poor working class children in Great Britain during the early 19th century. The reports exposed the inadequate provision of schooling and the maladministration of charitable funds given for educating the poor. It was eventually used to justify the first state intervention into English and Welsh education in 1833 when the Treasury started to help fund the badly needed construction of new school-houses through an annual grant. It also started a parliamentary commission of inquiry into improving charitable foundations which eventually led to formation of present-day charities commission.

== Background ==
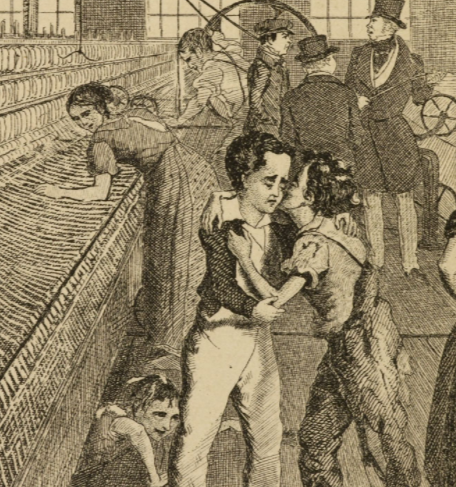
Illustration (1840) showing children labouring in Manchester's textile mills, from Frances Trollope's novel, Michael Armstrong, the Factory Boy

In the early 19th century, most poor working class children were expected to work in factories or on farms at a very young age, so received little or no education. It was debated whether the state should intervene and promote universal education, for instance along the lines of the Prussian education system. The case for such state intervention was made in their major publications by contemporary philosophers such as Adam Smith (Wealth of Nations), La Chalotais (Essay on National Education) and Tom Paine (Rights of Man). At that time, education for the children of the poor was mainly provided by charities, led by two charitable societies: the British and Foreign School Society and the Anglican National Society, who both advocated the use of the Monitorial System as a cheap and effective method to teach poor children. Although a degree of state support for education had existed in Scotland since the Education Act 1633, and grants had recently been introduced in Ireland, there was none in England and Wales. Consequently Samuel Whitbread, a founder of the British and Foreign School Society, submitted the Parochial Schools Bill to Parliament in 1807, which tried to extend a similar system to that of the Scots, to the rest of Great Britain; but this was blocked in parliament with the following arguments used to oppose the bill:

- Minimal state: There existed a deep-rooted idea that the state should not interfere in peoples' lives, including the provision of education, which should be left to the churches, charities and private schools.
- Subservience: It was thought that educating the working class would cause unrest, whereas the uneducated working class were more accepting of their place in society and their poor living and working conditions
- Taxes: Landowners and factory owners were against being forced to pay rates (taxes) for education; they argued this should be funded by benevolent voluntary donations.
- Secularisation: The Anglican church was concerned that the state would eventually introduce secular education, taking away churches' sway over education and so undermining the Anglican faith in future generations.
- Non-conformists: Non-conformists were concerned that state-provided education would become dominated by Anglican denominational teaching, undermining their faiths for future generations.

Although these arguments succeeded in blocking this bill, it was clear from the parliamentary debate that a general sympathy had emerged in Parliament for action to improve education for poor children.

== Parliamentary inquiry ==
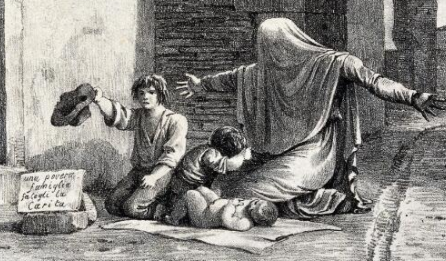
Illustration showing pauper children begging in the street with their mother (Anonymous Lithograph in Welcome Collection)

After Whitbread's death by suicide in 1815, Henry Brougham who was also on the Lancastrian committee supporting the British & Foreign School Society, became the new de facto leader of the parliamentary group endeavouring to improve education for poor children. Subsequently, in May 1816, Brougham secured the appointment of a select committee to inquire into the education of the lower orders of the metropolis (London) under his chairmanship with the following remit: –

"To consider what may be fit to be done with respect to the children of paupers who shall be found begging in the streets in and near the metropolis, or who shall be carried out by persons asking for charity, and whose parents, or other persons who they accompany, have not sent such children to any of the schools provided for the education of poor children."

— Terms of Reference, Report of the 1816 Committee on the Education of the Lower Orders in the Metropolis (Note: The committee was renewed in May 1817 but were unable to continue their inquiries and then renewed again in March 1818, when the committee's remit was extended from London to the whole of England & Wales, it was then further extended to include Scotland in May 1818.)

== Membership of the committee ==
The membership of the committee expanded considerably over time in line with its expansion of scope, at the end of its tenure in 1818, it consisted of the following: - (Note: After the full impact of the select committee had become apparent, government accusations were made in parliament by Robert Peel in 1819, that the committee had been packed by opposition Whigs and Independents, whereas MPs who normally voted with the Tory government had been under represented.) (Note: The Whig members were of a high calibre as many went onto higher ministerial offices when a Whig government eventually replaced the Tories in 1830, those members were: – Henry Brougham, William Lamb, John Lambton Henry Parnell, The Marquess of Tavistock, and Sir James Graham. The Tories on the other hand had no ministers, senior figures or other notable representatives who would attain high office except Lord Binning who only joined the committee at a very late stage.)
  1. Henry Brougham (Whig MP for Winchelsea)
  2. Sir Samuel Romilly (Whig MP for Arundel)
  3. Sir James Mackintosh (Whig MP for Nairnshire)
  4. Henry Grey Bennett (Whig MP for Shrewsbury)
  5. Robert Gordon (Whig MP for Wareham)
  6. Thomas Babington (Independent MP for Leicester)
  7. Joseph Butterworth (Independent MP for Coventry)
  8. John Henry Smyth (Whig MP for Cambridge Univ.)
  9. John Smith (Tory MP for Midhurst)
  10. William Wilberforce (Independent MP for Bramber)
  11. William Lamb (Whig MP for Peterborough)
  12. Sir W. Curtis (Tory MP for City of London)
  13. Sir James Shaw (Tory MP for City of London),
  14. Sir Francis Burdett (Whig MP for Westminster)
  15. Charles Calvert (Whig MP for Southwark)
  16. Charles Barclay (Tory MP for Southwark)
  17. Lord Ossulton (Whig MP for Knareborough)
  18. Sir Ronald Fergusson (Whig MP for Dysart Burghs)
  19. Sir Henry Parnell (Whig MP for Queens County)
  20. Mr. George HoIford (Tory MP for Dungannon)
  21. The Marquess of Tavistock (Whig MP for Bedfordshire)
  22. Sir Thomas Dyke-Acland (Independent MP for Devon)
  23. John Atkins (Tory MP for City of London)
  24. Henry Wrottesley (Tory MP for Brackley)
  25. Abel Smith (Whig MP for Wendover)
  26. Robert Abercromby (Independent MP for Banffshire)
  27. John Warre (Independent MP for Lostwithiel)
  28. Frederick Douglas (Independent MP for Banbury)
  29. Ralph Sheldon (Independent MP for Wilton)
  30. Thomas Baring (Tory MP for Wycombe)
  31. Matthew Wood (Whig MP for City of London)
  32. John Lambton (Radical Whig MP for Durham)
  33. Charles Grant (Tory MP for Inverness-shire)
  34. William Douglas (Independent MP for Dumfries Burghs)
  35. Lord Advocate of Scotland (Independent MP for Anstruther Easter Burghs)
  36. Alexander Boswell (Independent MP for Plympton Erle)
  37. James Hunter Blair (Independent MP for Wigtownshire)
  38. Lord Binning (Tory MP for Rochester)
  39. Sir James Graham (Whig MP for Kingston upon Hull)

== Reports ==
The following reports were submitted to the House of Commons by the select committee then subsequently published: - (Note: The key findings were documented in the third and final report of the 1818 committee. In addition, to publicise the charitable abuses which the select committee had discovered, Brougham wrote an open public letter with an appendix to Romilly on 20 August 1818 prior to the printing & distribution of the 1818 reports.)
Submitted	Report	Section	Section Description	Pages
7 June 1816	Reports from the 1816 Select Committee on the Education of the Lower Orders in the Metropolis	Report	Terms of Reference, Report & Recommendations	i – ii
7 June 1816	Reports from the 1816 Select Committee on the Education of the Lower Orders in the Metropolis	First Report	Minutes of Evidence (22/05/1816 – 01/06/1816)	001–194
13 June 1816	Reports from the 1816 Select Committee on the Education of the Lower Orders in the Metropolis	Second Report	Minutes of Evidence (03/06/1816 – 05/06/1816)	195–294
19 June 1816	Reports from the 1816 Select Committee on the Education of the Lower Orders in the Metropolis	Third Report	Minutes of Evidence (06/06/1816 – 13/06/1816)	295–482
20 June 1816	Reports from the 1816 Select Committee on the Education of the Lower Orders in the Metropolis	Fourth Report	Minutes of Evidence (14/06/1816 – 19/06/1816)	483–554
20 June 1816	Reports from the 1816 Select Committee on the Education of the Lower Orders in the Metropolis	Appendix	Information Returns from London Charity Schools	555–568
20 June 1816	Reports from the 1816 Select Committee on the Education of the Lower Orders in the Metropolis	Appendix	Gilbert Act 1786, Educational Charity Returns	569–577
20 June 1816	Reports from the 1816 Select Committee on the Education of the Lower Orders in the Metropolis	Addenda	Extracts from Deed of Gift of St Martins Library	579–580
20 June 1816	Reports from the 1816 Select Committee on the Education of the Lower Orders in the Metropolis	Addenda	Example Charter for King Edward VI hospital	580–590
20 June 1816	Reports from the 1816 Select Committee on the Education of the Lower Orders in the Metropolis	Addenda	Extracts from Bull Unigenitus	591–596
20 June 1816	Reports from the 1816 Select Committee on the Education of the Lower Orders in the Metropolis	Index		597–608
7 July 1817	Report from the 1817 Select Committee on the Education of the Lower Orders in the Metropolis	Report	Recommend expanding remit to England & Wales	001 -853
17 March 1818	Reports from the 1818 Select Committee on the Education of the Lower Orders	First Report	Recommending Proceedings	001 -853
25 May 1818	Reports from the 1818 Select Committee on the Education of the Lower Orders	Second Report	Parochial & Other Schools	001 -853
3 June 1818	Reports from the 1818 Select Committee on the Education of the Lower Orders	Third Report	Abuses at Charities for the Education the Poor et al.	001 -853
5 June 1818	Reports from the 1818 Select Committee on the Education of the Lower Orders	Appendix A	Eton Statutes	001 -853
6 June 1818	Reports from the 1818 Select Committee on the Education of the Lower Orders	Appendix B	Statutes of Trinity and St John's College Cambridge	001 -853
1 April 1819	Digest of Parochial Returns made to the Education Committee of 1818	Volume I	England (part 1) – Counties by alphabetic order	001–576
1 April 1819	Digest of Parochial Returns made to the Education Committee of 1818	Volume II	England (part 2) – Counties by alphabetic order	577–1170
1 April 1819	Digest of Parochial Returns made to the Education Committee of 1818	Volume III	Wales, Scotland, British Isles and Additional Returns	1171–1496

== Findings ==
=== Charities ===
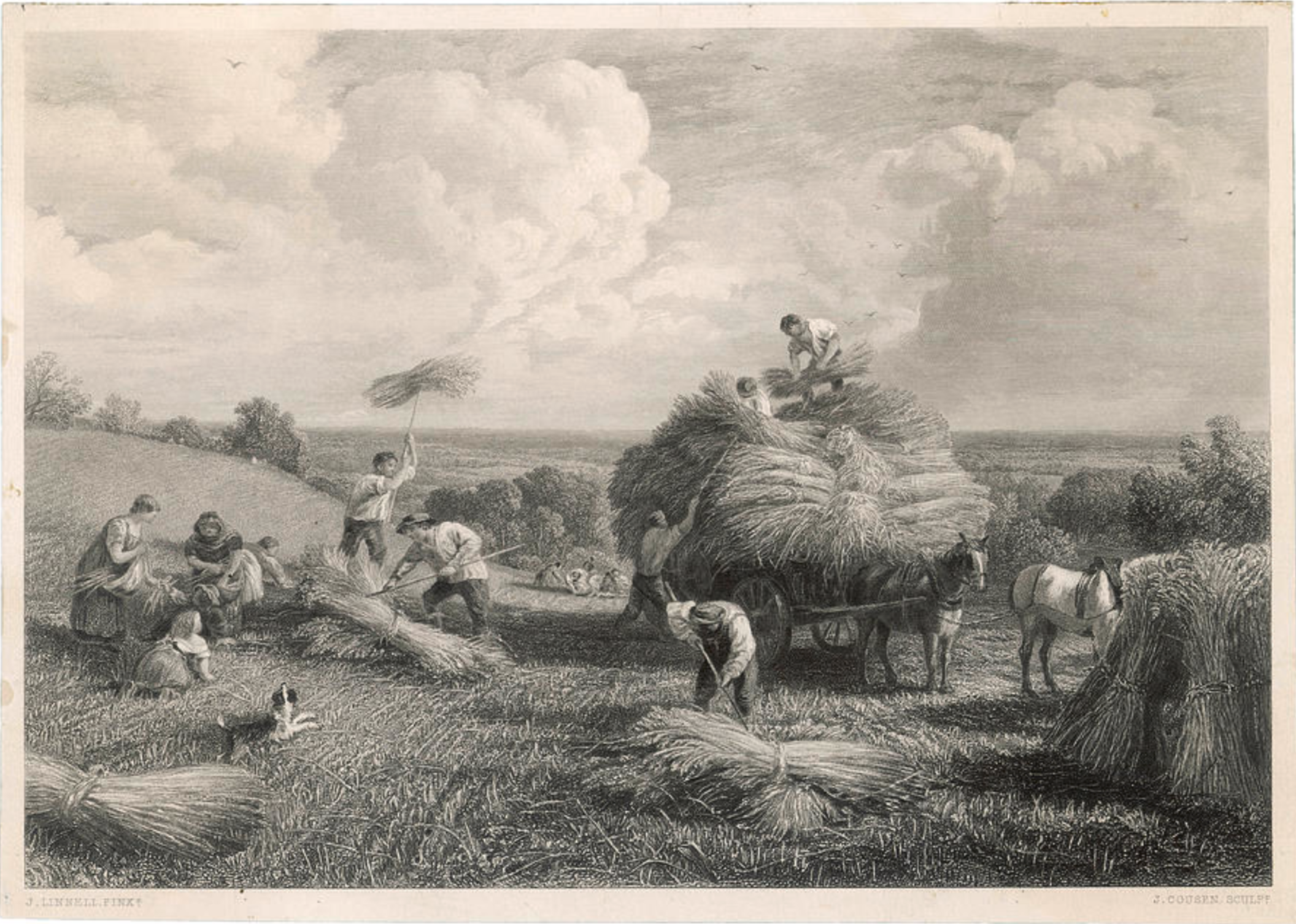
Land was often bequeathed to school charities so tenant farmers paid rent for the right to work the land with the income used to fund schools for the poor (Engraving by J. Cousen after J. Linnell)

Education for poor children was mostly funded by charitable trusts. Unfortunately the committee found high levels of abuse and maladministration in those charities, in particular in managing valuable endowments bequeathed by benevolent donors to fund the charity schools. This took many forms:

- Neglect: Trustees were often negligent or careless in their management of charitable estates, for instance in failing to increase rents, this was partly explained by the fact they normally acted on a voluntary basis and were unpaid.
- Limited Powers: Trustees often had not been granted powers by the trust deed to manage estates efficiently, for instance to sell under-developed land for building purposes then use the proceeds to buy higher yielding alternative property.
- Surplus: Often the income from an estate would expand well beyond the amounts needed for its charitable purpose resulting in large unused surplus funds, the trustees had not the powers to expand the original charitable purpose.
- No Trustees: Some trust deeds had no clauses for appointment of new trustees; thus, on the last trustee's death the endowment trust would become unmanaged; while others fell into the same situation accidentally when the last trustee did not appoint a successor before their death.
- Diversion: The clergy, who were often the trustees, sometimes diverted funds earmarked for the poor to teaching middle-class ecclesiastical subjects such as Latin and Greek needed for future clergymen
- Under-funding: Trustees sometimes under-funded their charity schools by hiring unqualified teachers, or allowing schools to fall into disrepair, or taking on very few scholars, then embezzling the majority of the endowment income for themselves.
- Nepotism: Trustees sometimes rented estates out to family or friends at much reduced rents or vastly extended leases, thus dispossessing the charity of income.
- Fraud: Endowed assets were sometimes stolen through outright fraud.
- Teachers: Schoolmasters sometimes received funding, including board and lodgings but taught no poor children in return.
- Audits: Charity auditors, sometimes known as visitors, were supposed to check that charitable trusts were acting appropriately, but some deeds never appointed visitors; while in other cases, the visitors failed to carry out their duties.

Cases of such abuses and maladministration were most prominently publicised through speeches in parliament, the reports of the inquiries and the public letter from Brougham to Romilly of 20 August 1818, where examples were given for the following schools: St. Bees, Winchester, Highgate, Pocklington, Brentwood, Mere, Spital, Yeovil, Huntingdon and Eton College. Furthermore, the final committee found anecdotal evidence that similar situations were likely to be found at all charities.

=== Educational provision ===
==== The basis for educating poor children ====
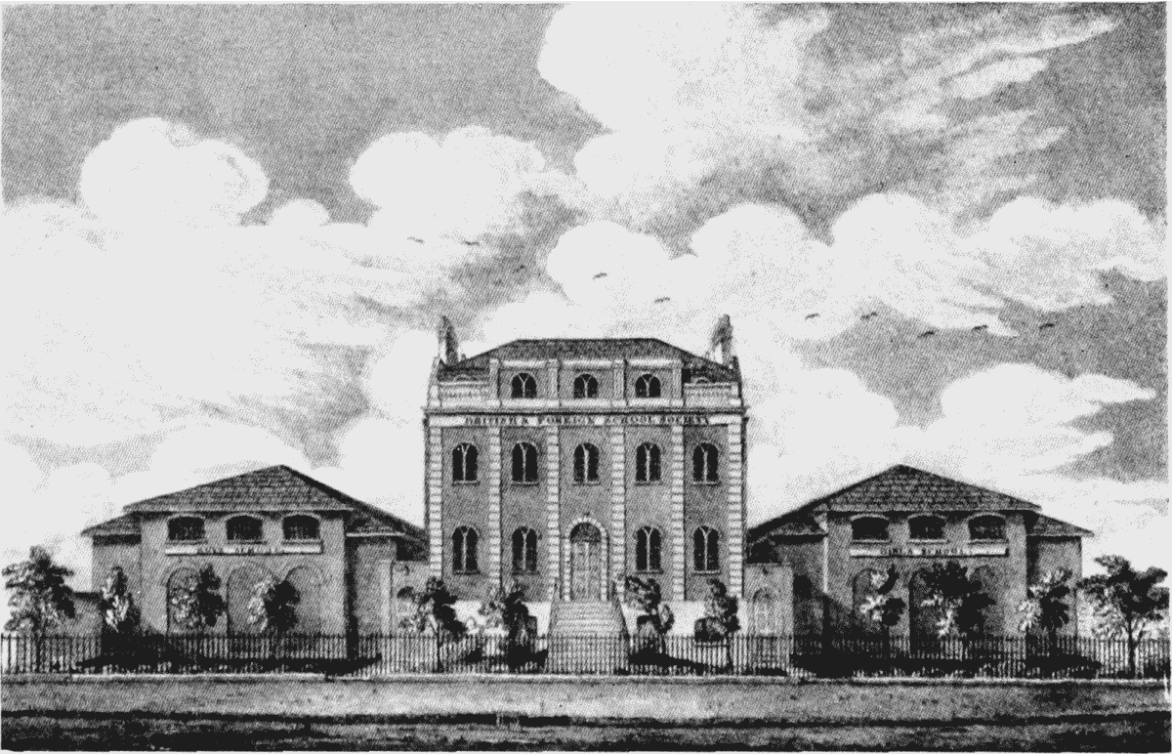
An 1817 illustration of the Borough Road (Royal Free) School, the principle school of the British and Foreign School Society

The very basic tenets for educating the poor had yet to become established in society, so the committee presented the reasoning with evidence:

- Poor parents universally desired and sought to educate their children, dispelling any misconceptions which may have suggested otherwise
- There was deemed to be a great public benefit to educating the poor, in particular to improve their morals through reading of scriptures and prayer books and to reduce crime.
- Charity schools were applauded for the education they provided poor children, and by using the efficient Monitorial System, testaments estimated that £400,000 per annum would be sufficient to educate all the poor children in England.
- Unfortunately, there was a substantive shortage of free or subsidised school places to educate poor children at charity schools.

==== Shortage of school places ====
The committee endeavoured to quantify the shortage of both schools and school places. The 1818 select committee had expanded its remit to include rural parishes, whereupon they discovered that 3,500 of the 12,000 parishes had no school whatsoever. In addition, the extensive returns in the digest of parochial returns showed 650,000 children were educated, 1/14 to 1/15 of the total population of England. Edmund Halley's seminal demographic analysis of Breslau had suggested that the number of children of school-going age should be 1/9 of the population; meanwhile the digest of parochial returns suggested that in England this ratio should be closer to 1/10 of the population, making between 1/9 and 1/10 of the population (approx. one million) being children who required education; this meant that about 350,000 children were receiving no education.

==== Religious constraints ====
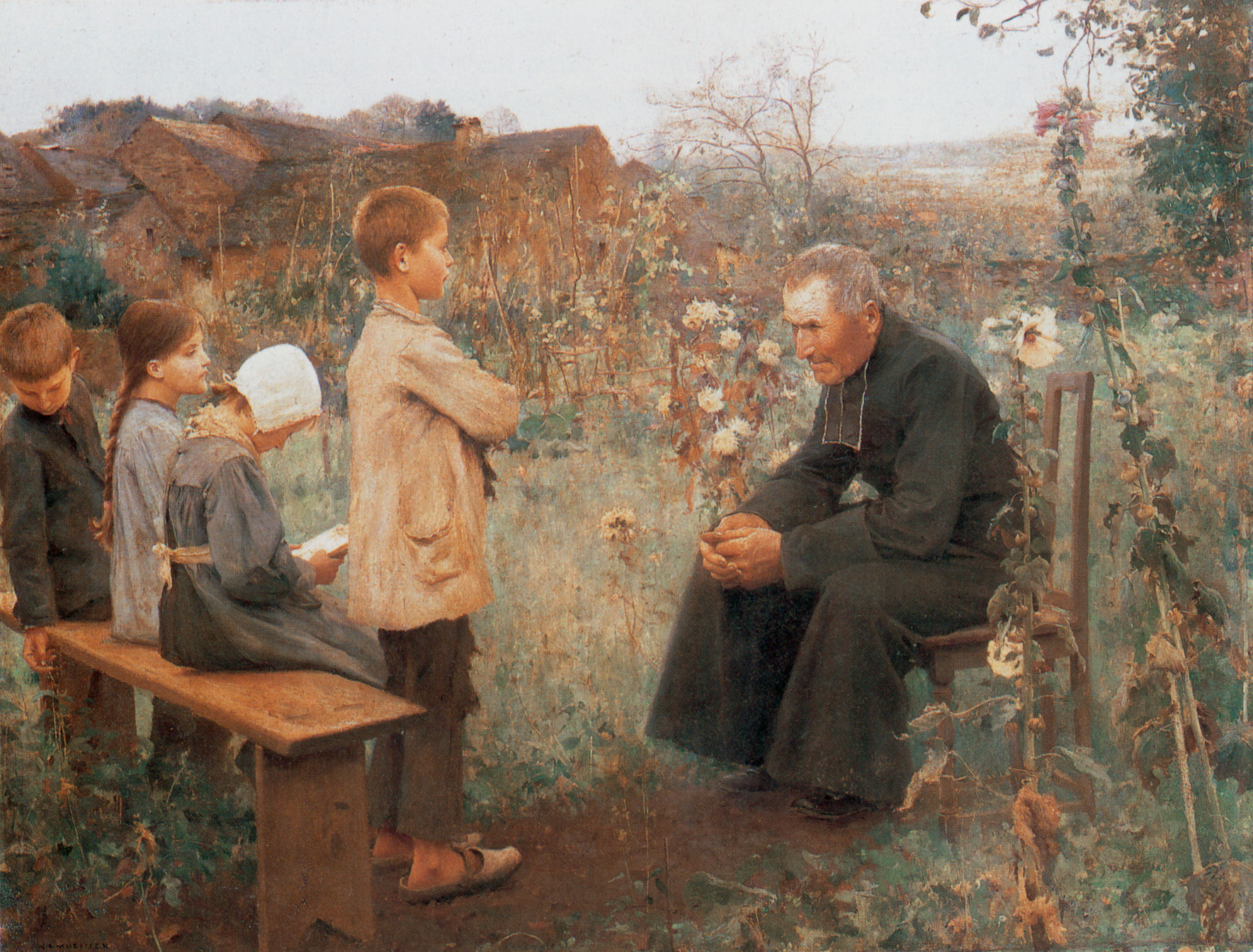
Painting by Jules-Alexis Muenier showing the teaching of the catechism which was denominational and so acted as a barrier to education for children of other denominations

The majority of charitable schools were parochial schools including those of the largest charitable society, the Anglican National School Society, these schools would often only take children whose parents were members of the local church's congregation. In addition, these parochial schools had denominated religious teaching within their curriculum including the catechism of their theology which parents and clergy of other theologies would object to and so refuse to send their children to those schools. For instance Roman Catholics, Protestant Dissenters & Jews may refuse to send their children to an Anglican school which taught the Anglican catechisms. This was not necessarily a problem in urban areas where the large populations could support many schools of different faiths but in small rural parishes where it was only economical for a single school to exist, this prevented children of some faiths from receiving any education.

The committee further noted that in Scotland there was a greater degree of homogeneity between their faiths than in England, people being predominantly Calvinist and Presbyterian, especially in the rural parishes. This meant that the parish schools inclusively allowed all children to attend and parents were happy to learn the catechisms taught in their local school as they would differ little to those of their own churches. England though had a wider diversity with Roman Catholics, Anglicans, Dissenting Protestants and Jews differing to an extent where children were not sent across the faith divide to be educated. The unfortunate consequence was that the much admired Scottish Parish school system which provided universal education, could not be easily copied to England & Wales as Whitbread had discovered with the failure of the Parochial Bill in 1807.

== Recommendations ==
=== Main plan of persuasion ===
The committee needed to get about 350,000 poor children in England & Wales off the streets and into charity schools, which did not have sufficient school-places. They aimed to achieve this by better using the existing resources in the charity school system rather than by introducing a new public school system which had been opposed previously because of resistance to new taxes and the desire to have a minimal state. Two elements were needed to better exploit the resources in the charity school system, firstly the income from charitable sources could be increased by ending the endemic neglect & abuses at charitable trusts, and secondly charity schools could more efficiently provision extra school-places by increasing the use of the Monitorial System, the mantra being quantity over quality.

To achieve this plan, the committee were inclined to persuade charitable trustees and school masters to act differently by inculcating new ideas to them, the committee had proven through their own inquiries how the mere act of inquiry had changed the way charitable trustees and schools operated, hence the committee proposed two separate parliamentary commissions to continue the process of engaging charitable trustees and schools throughout the country. One commission was to look into the workings of the charities and the other the workings of the schools. As the commission for charities had to tackle corruption, Brougham proposed a stronger commission of remunerated full time itinerant commissioners with the powers to subpoena witnesses, take evidence under oath and demand documents under penalty of fine or imprisonment.

=== Erection of schoolhouses ===
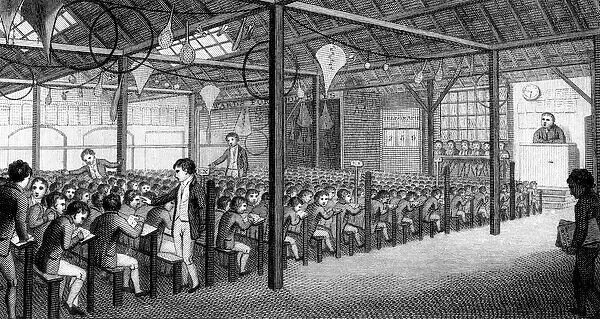
The large hall sized interior of the Borough Road (Royal Free) School (1805 engraving), The single teacher is at the front teaching monitors (older pupils), whist other monitors teach the younger children. Playground toys hang from the ceiling:- hoops, rackets & balls.

For charity schools, their main cost was the salaries of schoolmasters but by persuading more schools to adopt the Monitorial System of Andrew Bell & Joseph Lancaster, a much larger number of poor children could be educated for the same cost, the main drawback was the need for schoolhouses with hall sized classrooms needed for the large classes of the Monitorial System. Notwithstanding the need to re-model school buildings, there was a chronic shortage of schoolhouses anyway and although charitable income was deemed sufficient for the ongoing expenses of charity schools, it was recognised that it was insufficient for the capital outlays needed to build new schoolhouses. The committee hence recommended that parliament should contribute to the construction of new school-houses. The committee left open two options for parliament on how these funds could be spent. Firstly, the monies could simply be spent with the two preeminent educational societies promoting the Monitorial System: – the British & Foreign School Society and the Anglican National School Society. Alternatively, the monies could additionally be directed to the mass of smaller, mainly parochial school societies but this would need Commissioners to agree terms, which invariably would have been to adopt the Monitorial System and to allow children of all denominations & faiths.

=== Removal of religious constraints ===
The other major act of persuasion needed was to coax all parochial schools to accept poor children of other faiths & denominations and to exempt such children from learning denominated catechisms and reading from the scriptures if it was religiously sensitive. This was only imperative in parishes which could only support a single school so children of all denominations needed to be able to attend that single school. This task of persuasion was to fall on the proposed parliamentary commission for the workings of the schools.

=== Rural parishes without schools ===
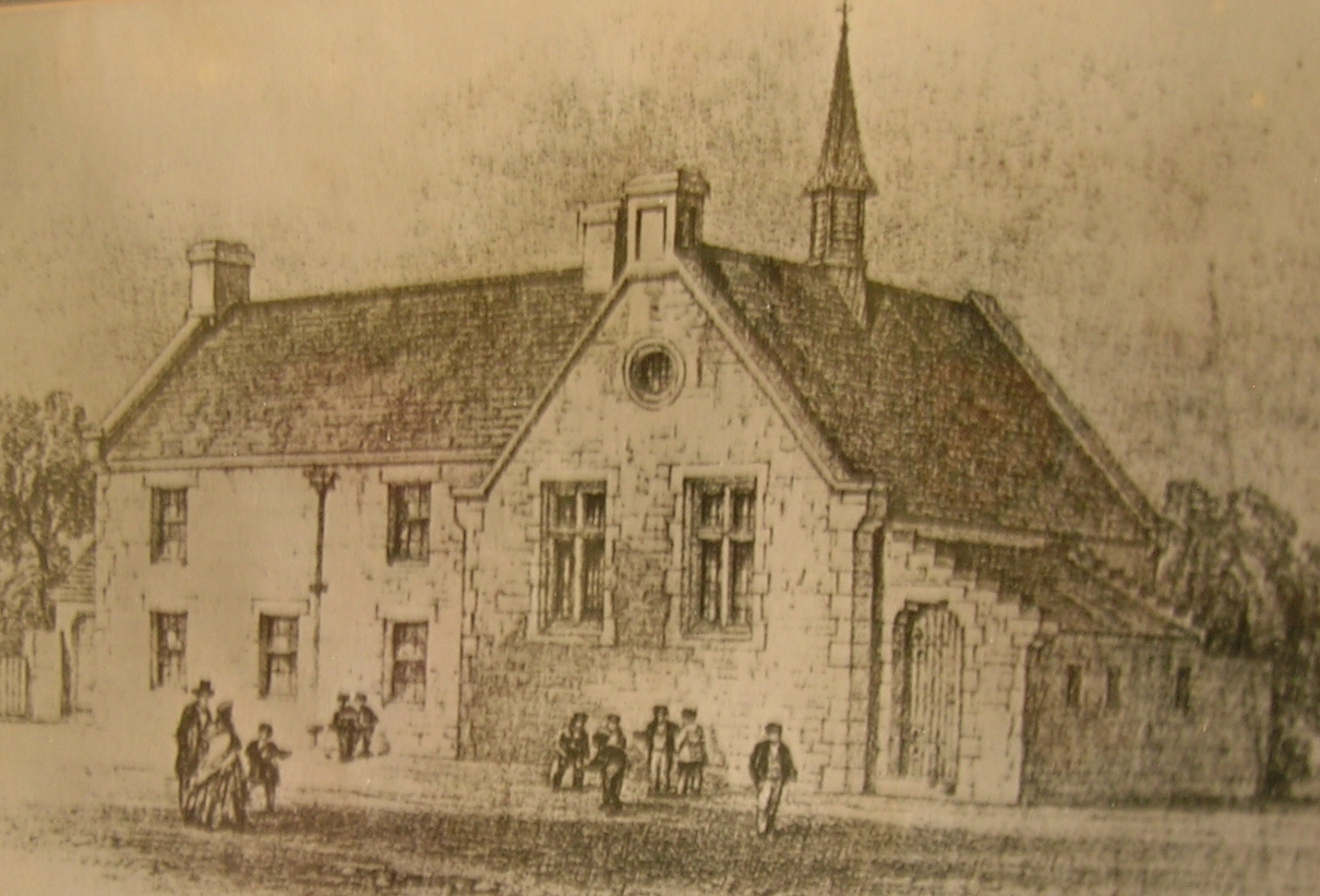
Kingsford Clachan School in Scotland during the 1840s, exemplifying the Scottish Parochial School system .

Unfortunately the committee also had to accept that this broad plan would not work in some rural parishes where there was no school, and the small populations meant charitable contributions were meagre and the economies of scale in the Monitorial System were unrealizable. The result was insufficient funds to educate the children of such rural parishes. So as an exception, the committee proposed to emulate the Scottish Parochial School system in these places by legislation so schools for rural parishes would be funded by taxation on the local landowners. As with Whitbread's Parochial Bill of 1807, the main issue once again was how to find a compromise acceptable to both the Anglican & Dissenting Protestant churches who were both strongly represented in parliament.

== Outcomes ==
=== Charities ===
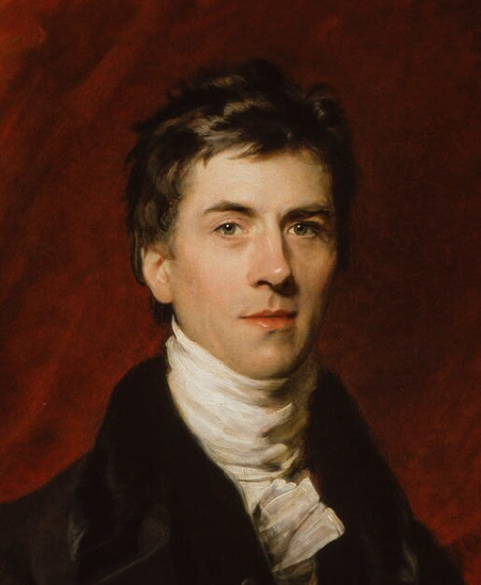
Henry Brougham in 1825, nine years after the inauguration of the select committee (Portrait in Oil by Sir Thomas Lawrence)

A Bill to appoint commissioners to inquire into the abuses in charities was passed in a limited form on 10 June 1818 (58 Geo. III), its remit was continuously widened and powers strengthened as periodically the commission was revived by parliament. This was in no small part due to the pressure caused by Brougham as he courted publicity for the subject through speeches in parliament, the publication of the reports and a public letter from Brougham to Romilly, which widely socialised the problems present in charities. The resulting commission became known as the Brougham Commission but neither Brougham nor any member of the committee were originally appointed as commissioners by the Tory government.

The commissions' investigations were to take twenty years and resulted in a survey of nearly 30,000 charities, documented in forty volumes of reports, published in six parts between 1837 and 1840 which eventually cost £250,000, the final report recommended the establishment of a permanent charity commission, which Parliament eventually adopted albeit not until 1853.

As expected by the Inquiry, the commission's investigatory process itself abated many evils in charity administration, mostly making it unnecessary to commence legal proceedings. Many trustees who had been ignorant of their duties or guilty of nonfeasance focused for the first time on their fiduciary obligations. This by itself improved the accountability of many charities. The Commissioners also offered technical assistance, mediated disputes, recommended changes in practices, offered suggestions and observations, and, where needed, occasionally threatened and browbeat trustees. Altogether 2,100 trusts were reformed or renovated in some way without legal retort, unfortunately, 400 charities had to be referred to the Attorney General for prosecution, most of which were acted on, through the Court of Chancery. This left nearly ninety percent of those charities examined to be deemed to be in good order, albeit the mere existence of a charity commission and threat of inquiry was thought to have had salutary effect causing this good behaviour.

=== Educational provision ===
While the recommendations on charities of the inquiry were generally accepted, they were mainly rejected in the field of general education.

==== Commission for education ====
Brougham's initial proposed commission into general education was struck down by the House of Lords and the subsequent reiteration for such a commission in the final report was never accepted. This left no mechanism to increase the numbers of children educated by promoting the Monitorial System, or to persuade for the removal of religious constraints which were a barrier to education for some children.

==== Public education ====
Between 1820 and 1821, Brougham went on to make two attempts at implementing a state education system equivalent to the Scottish Parochial School system, but limited to the educationally deprived rural areas of England & Wales. These attempts were through the Education of the Poor Bill, the first attempt in 1820 failed due to resistance to the additional tax burden from such a scheme. In the second attempt in 1821, Brougham removed the tax burden and instead proposed to use excess funds from charitable endowments through two separate bills. This time the attempt failed because Protestant Dissenters felt Brougham had made too many compromises to the Anglican church so opposed the bills. Just like Whitbread before him, Brougham had been unable to find a compromise which appeased both the established Anglican church and the non-conformists.

==== Funding the construction of school-houses ====
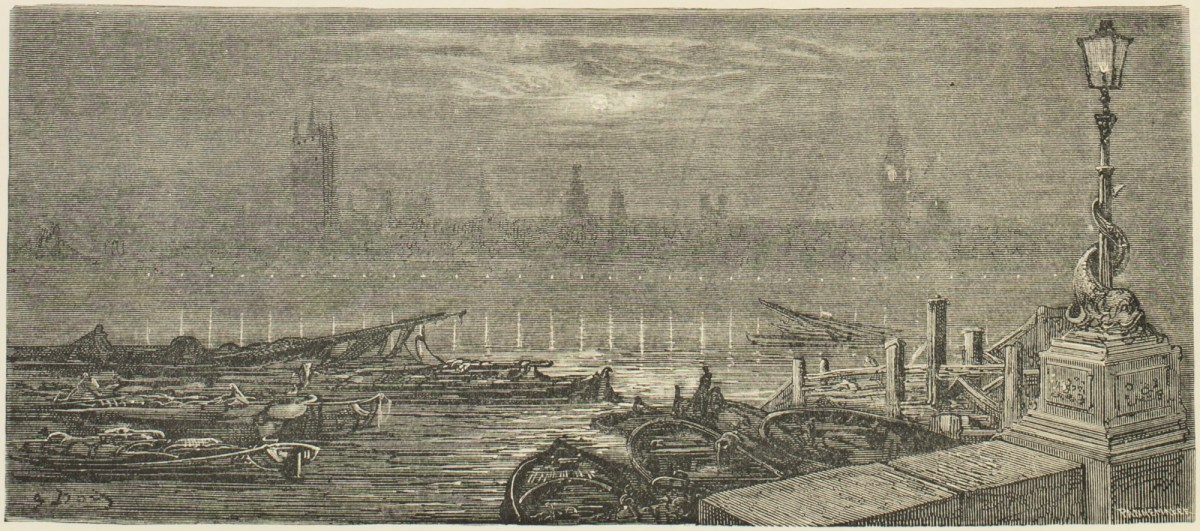
The Houses of Parliament (1872) after Gustav Dore. Depicts night time when the funding for education was passed.

The only success was the third recommendation from the committee, for parliament to fund the construction of school-houses. Even this recommendation had to wait over a decade until after Earl Grey's Whig government had replaced the Tory administration; helpfully, a complement of the committee became ministers in the new government, including Brougham himself, who had become the Lord Chancellor. (Note: The Whig members were of a high calibre as many went to higher ministerial offices when a Whig government eventually replaced the Tories in 1830. Those members were: Henry Brougham, William Lamb, John Lambton Henry Parnell, The Marquess of Tavistock, and Sir James Graham. The Tories, on the other hand, had no ministers, senior figures or other notable representatives who would attain high office except Lord Binning, who only joined the committee at a very late stage.) Despite the Whig majority, debates in parliament including a proposed resolution for National Education by John Roebuck evidenced the previous religious, tax and minarchy arguments still continued to oppose any progress in education.

The Whig government concluded that any parliamentary assistance for education had to be passed somewhat surreptitiously, so the Chancellor of the Exchequer, Lord Althrop waited until mid-August 1833, a fortnight before the summer recess, when few parliamentarians remained in the Commons. At 2 am in the early hours of Friday 16 August 1833, at the very end of the Supply and Miscellaneous Estimates committee session and without any written notice to the committee, he sprung a surprise verbal resolution, proposing an annual grant of £20,000 for the construction of school-houses in accordance with the recommendations of the education committee fifteen years prior! Despite protests for a proper parliamentary debate with formal notice, and at a sensible time within a full House of Commons, it was passed. The very next day, which was a Saturday, the supply of the grant was debated and passed with other finance measures in a sparse parliament by 50 votes for and 26 votes against (only 76 MPs out of a possible 658 were present).

Although the amount of the annual grant was small for its purpose, many historians have considered this a significant watershed moment in the history of education, as state promotion of education had now started across the whole of the United Kingdom and would expand with time. At the same time, as this had not been achieved through primary legislation by a dedicated act of parliament, the government civil service needed to manage the educational monies to be set up later through secondary legislation by the Privy Council. This was unsatisfactory, as education was then overseen by the Privy Council rather than by a cabinet minister with authority divested from parliament. Despite the substantial expansion in the education budget and powers of the authority, this state of affairs was to persist until the 20th century.

== Sources for the inquiries ==
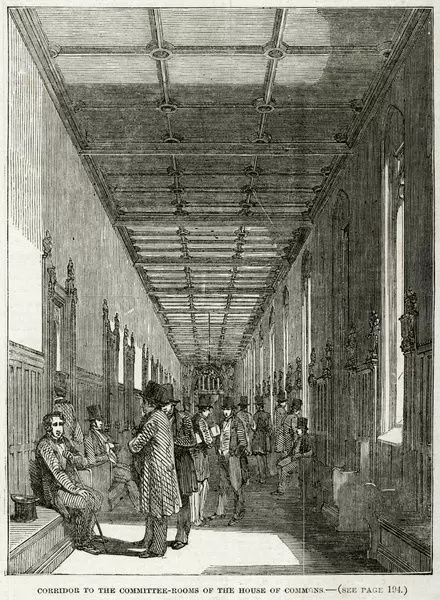
Corridor to the committee rooms of the House of Commons, Westminster where select committee members gathered prior to their committee meetings (Illustrated London News 1853)

The committee gathered information from the following sources:

Responses to questionnaires from the committee

- In 1816, questionnaires were sent out through a circular letter to a sample of charity schools in London.
- In 1818, a refined questionnaire was sent out to the clergy of the 12,000 parishes in England & Wales, with replies received from 11,800. The returns were compiled into the fifteen hundred page, digest of parochial returns with the help of two Barristers of the Court of Chancery, this has become a major historical source today, the extract for the county of Rutland exemplifies their level of detail.

Charitable income assessment

- The Returns of Charitable Donations Act 1786 (26 Geo. 3. c. 58) obliged parishes to provide accurate figures on both poor law expenditure and charitable payments to the poor during the previous three years, these were known as the Gilbert Returns. On 17 June 1816, the poor return office in Whitehall responded to a request by the committee by providing the annual donations made to each school charity in the London area, consisting of the counties of Middlesex and Surrey, plus a summary for the surrounding home counties of Bedford, Kent and Berkshire.
- The inquiries also obtained information on the levels of charitable donations and presence of endowments from the returns to the questionnaires.

Results from previous surveys and field studies

- Door to door inquiries had been carried out by various organisations in certain poor districts, these were used to estimate the number of poor children who received no education, the largest surveys were by: – the Soup Institute in Spitalfields, the West London Lancastrian Society in Covent Garden, the Southwark School Auxiliary Society in Southwark, and the East London Auxiliary Sunday School Union Society in East London.

Interviews

- The main source of information for the reports was interviews with a wide variety of individuals involved in the provision of education for poor children, such as schoolmasters and treasurers of the charitable societies providing education. In particular, Brougham already had an association with the West London Lancastrian Association and the British & Foreign School Society through his work on the Lancastrian Committee and their representatives were interviewed extensively. These interviews were documented in the minutes of evidence of the inquiry.

Unsolicited approaches

- The inquiry generated a great a deal of public awareness as the committee and its members publicised the abuses at charities, this publicity in itself resulted in a large number of unsolicited letters and petitions from the public informing the committee of further abuses.

Documentation

- Educational charities supplied example statutes, deeds of gifts and charters to the committee, of particular note was the statutes of Eton and both the college's of St. Johns and Trinity of Cambridge University.
- As another example, the Bull Unigenitus was supplied as evidence of the sensitivity of the Roman Catholic church to the religious education of their children.
