= National school (England and Wales) =

Schools established by a charity in England and Wales

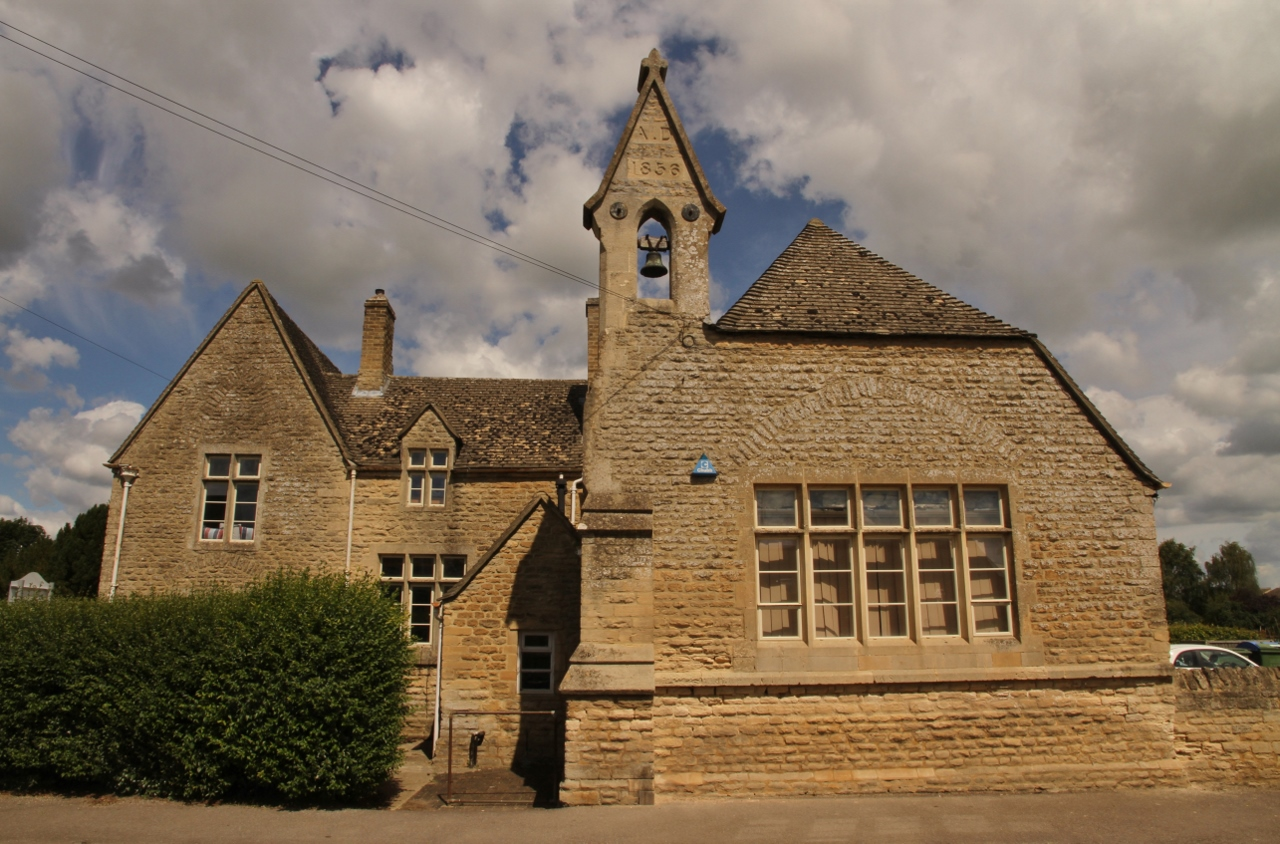
Aston and Cote Church of England Primary School in Aston, Oxfordshire, built as a National School in 1856

A National school was a school founded in 19th-century England and Wales by the National Society for Promoting Religious Education. These schools provided elementary education, in accordance with the teaching of the Church of England, to the children of the poor. Together with the less numerous British schools of the British and Foreign School Society, they provided the first near-universal system of elementary education in England and Wales.

The schools were eventually absorbed into the state system, either as fully state-run schools or as faith schools funded by the state.

== History ==
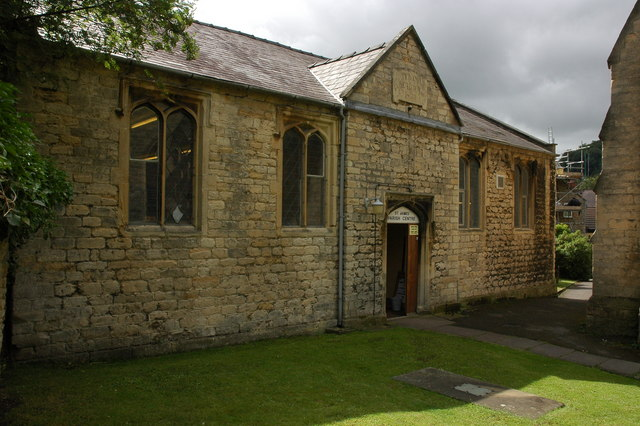
Former National School (built in 1833) in St James's Churchyard, Dursley, Gloucestershire

Prior to 1800, education for poorer children was limited to isolated charity schools.

In 1808 the Royal Lancastrian Society (later the British and Foreign School Society) was created to promote schools using the Monitorial System of Joseph Lancaster.

The National Society was set up in 1811 to establish similar schools using the system of Andrew Bell, but based on the teachings of the Church of England in contrast to the non-denominational Christian instruction of the Lancastrian schools. The National Society aimed to establish a National school in every parish of England and Wales. The schools were usually next to the parish church, and named after it.

From 1833, the state began to pay annual grants to the societies, with the much larger National Society receiving a proportionally larger share. The grants increased over time, but they were accompanied by inspections and increasing demands from the state. The rigid monitorial system, though economical, came to be viewed by inspectors as limited.

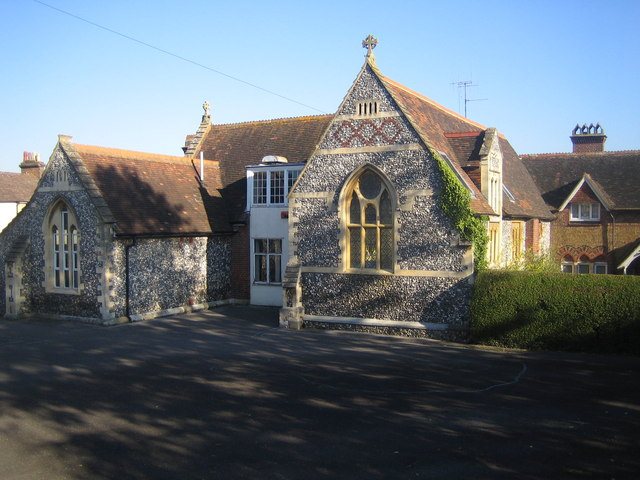
St Mary's voluntary aided Church of England First School, Northchurch, Hertfordshire. The school still uses the original 1864 building for communal purposes.

The Elementary Education Act 1870 (33 & 34 Vict. c. 75) provided for the establishment of board schools to supplement those of the societies, and allowed for state funding of 50% of the running costs of voluntary schools, but phased out capital funding.

The National Society responded by raising £10 million and almost doubling the number of its schools to 12,000 in 15 years. However the schools found it difficult to meet their maintenance costs, and also suffered from competition with board schools. Many schools were closed or handed over to the school boards. The Education Act 1902 provided some relief.

Under the Education Act 1944 ("the Butler Act") these schools became voluntary aided or voluntary controlled primary schools, funded by the state but still able to promote the teachings of the Church of England.
