= National Society for Promoting Religious Education =

Religious education society in England

The National Society (Church of England and Church in Wales) for the Promotion of Education, often just referred to as the National Society, and since 2016 also as The Church of England Education Office (CEEO), is significant in the history of education in England and Wales. It promotes church schools and Christian education in line with the established church. Historically it was in strong competition with the nonconformist organization British and Foreign School Society. Both promoted the monitorial system, whereby a few paid teachers worked with senior students who in turn taught the junior students. The National Society was strongly supported by the Anglican clergy, Oxford and Cambridge universities, and the established church. The nonconformist Protestants were in strong opposition.

== History ==
It was founded on 16 October 1811 as the "National Society for Promoting the Education of the Poor in the Principles of the Established Church in England and Wales". The Church of England, as the established religion, set out as the aim of the new organisation that "the National Religion should be made the foundation of National Education, and should be the first and chief thing taught to the poor, according to the excellent Liturgy and Catechism provided by our Church." One of the principal founders was Joshua Watson. By 1824 some 400,000 Anglican children attended 3000 Sunday schools sponsored by the National Society. The formation and early operation of the National Society was the origin of the liberal education policy passed by Parliament in the 1830s.

Historically, schools founded by the National Society were called National Schools, as opposed to the non-denominational "British schools" founded by the British and Foreign School Society.

Following the success of the Sunday school movement, the monitorial system of education was developed almost simultaneously by Andrew Bell and Joseph Lancaster. Bell was a clergyman in the Church of England and conducted an experiment with a monitorial school in Madras which he described in An Experiment in Education in 1797. Using this system and in opposition to the nondenominational Lancastrian Society, the Church of England set up the National Society for Promoting the Education of the Poor in the Principles of the Established Church. This monitorial system would dominate popular education for 50 years.
