= David Stow =

Scottish educationalist

David Stow

David Stow (17 May 1793 – 6 November 1864) was a Scottish educationalist.

== Life ==
Born at Paisley, Renfrewshire, the son of a successful merchant, he was educated at Paisley Grammar School before entering the Port-Eglinton Spinning Co. in 1811, an affiliation he was to maintain to the end of his life. His early involvement in Sunday School teaching led him to believe in the importance of effective training for teachers at all levels. His motto was "Train up a child in the way he should go, and when he is old he will not depart from it."

A leader of considerable ability and energy, in 1828, Stow set up his first day school in New City Road, Cowcaddens, Glasgow. Its success led to the establishment of the influential Glasgow Educational Society. In 1836, Stow established a Normal School for teacher training. The name was derived from the French word 'norma' meaning a rule or system. The Normal School existed to train teachers not to provide them with an education. Stow believed that his students should already possess the necessary education and knowledge of the curriculum they intended to teach. The school attracted students and observers from across the UK, including James Phillips Kay-Shuttleworth, education in England still being comparatively undeveloped at that stage. Teachers trained in Stow's 'system' were sent out to schools throughout the United Kingdom and the Colonies taking his approach across the world.

Stow's school became part of the establishment and, following the Disruption of 1843, a legal ruling of 1845 held that the school was part of the Church of Scotland. Stow and most of his colleagues and students were adherents of the Free Church of Scotland; for this reason, they were compelled to resign from what had become state-funded teaching posts. Stow established a new college in Glasgow as the Free Church Normal Seminary.

== The Glasgow System ==
The Glasgow System had been named "The Training System" by Stow. The system originated during the controversy over Bell-Lancaster method. Gladman, citing the British and Foreign School Society handbook, wrote "Failure occurred, as it always will, when masters were slaves to "the system," when they were satisfied with mechanical arrangements and routine work, or when they did not study their pupils, and get down to Principles of Education."

Gladman goes on to write that Stow, a young merchant, who, in his anxiety to "stem the torrent of vice and ungodliness, turned his attention to the young," and established a school on Sabbath evenings in the Saltmarket, "the very St. Giles of Glasgow," in 1816. Gladman writes that Stow realised that the training of the street was more important than any individual. Adding to the institution Stow had started, he also formalised his method. "The Training System cultivates the whole nature of the child, instead of the mere head – the affections and habits, as well as the intellect."

"The peculiarities of the Training System may be stated in one sentence, as – Picturing out in words, direct moral training, with suitable premises, and various practical methods by which these objects are accomplished, under well instructed and well trained masters or mistresses."

== Legacy ==
- The David Stow Building of the University of Strathclyde is named for him.
- Stow College (now Glasgow Kelvin College) in Glasgow was named for him.

== Bibliography ==
- Cruikshank, M. (1965). "David Stow, Scottish pioneer of teacher training in Britain". British Journal of Educational Studies. 14 (2): 205–215. doi:10.2307/3118654. JSTOR 3118654.
- Fraser, W. (1886). Memoir of the Life of David Stow: Founder of the Training System of Education. London: J. Nisbet.
- Gladman, F. J. (1886). School Work Control and Teaching Organisation and Principles of Education. Jarrold and Sons.
- Insh, G. P. (1938). The Life and Work of David Stow. Edinburgh: Lindsay.
- MacLehose, J. (1886). "89. David Stow 1793-1864". Memoirs and Portraits of One Hundred Glasgow Men Who Have Died During the Last Thirty Years. Vol. 2. Glasgow: James MacLehose & Sons. pp. 303–304.
- Morse, E. J. (2004). "Stow, David (1793–1864)". Oxford Dictionary of National Biography (online ed.). Oxford University Press. doi:10.1093/ref:odnb/26609. (Subscription or UK public library membership required.)
- Stow, D. (2004) [First published 1854]. The Training System, Moral Training School and Normal Seminary for Preparing School Trainers and Governesses (11th ed.). Kessinger. ISBN 1-4179-7062-6.
- White, G. (1997). "David Stow". In Harrison, M. M.; Marker, W. B. (eds.). Teaching the Teachers: The History of Jordanhill College of Education, 1828–1993. London: John Donald Publishers. pp. 1–11. ISBN 0-85976-436-2.
- White, Glanda (n.d.). "David Stow – A Sort of Amateur School Master". his history and achievements worldwide.
- Withrington, D. J (1993). "Stow, David". In de S. Cameron, N. M.; et al. (eds.). Dictionary of Scottish Church History and Theology. InterVarsity Press. ISBN 0-8308-1407-8.
