= British Schools Museum =

Museum in Hitchin, Hertfordshire, United Kingdom

Coordinates: 51°56′46″N 0°16′33″W

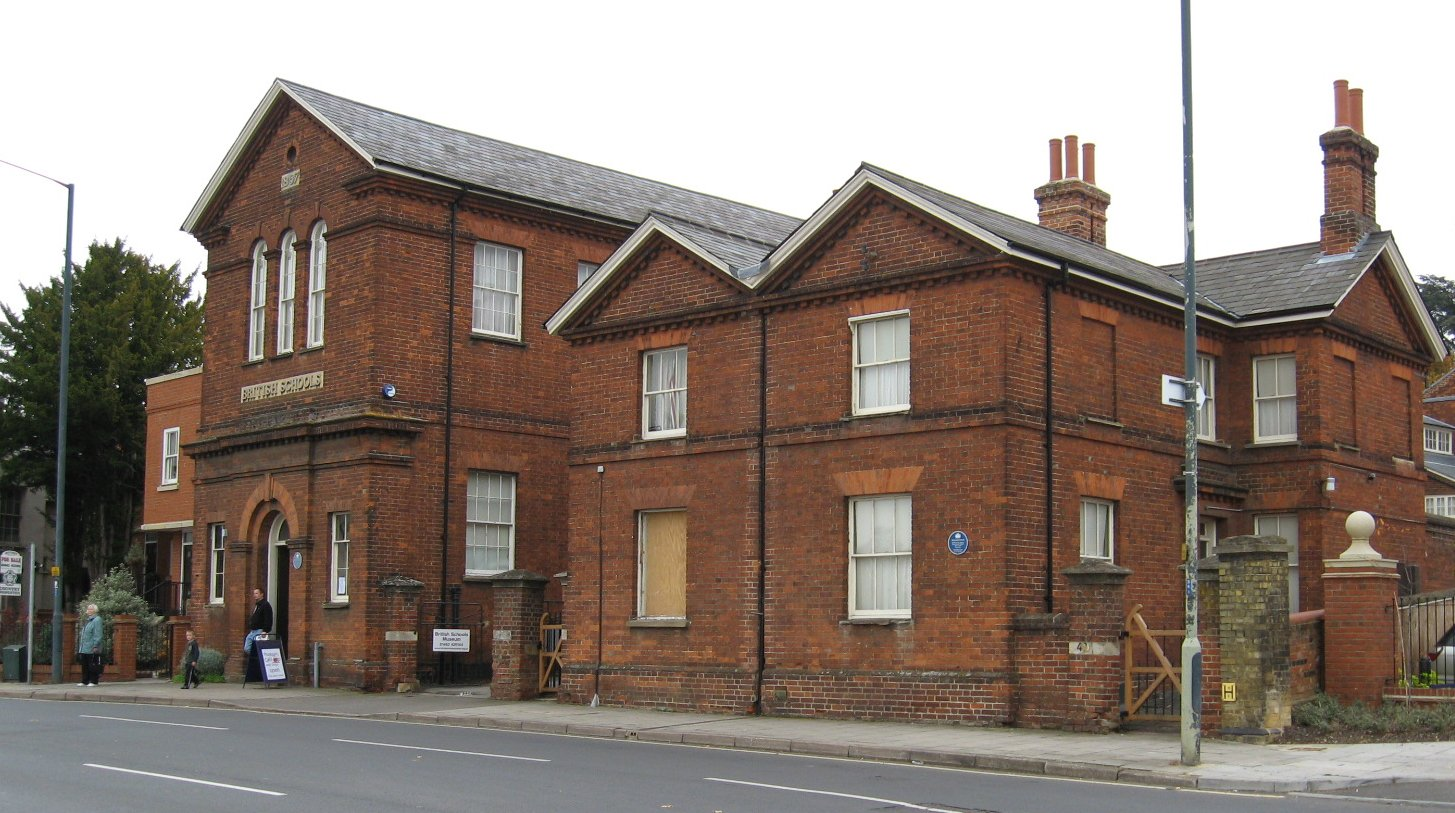
The British Schools Museum in Hitchin.

The British Schools Museum is an educational museum based in original Edwardian and Victorian school buildings in Hitchin in Hertfordshire, England. The museum complex is made up of listed school buildings housing infants, girls and boys schools with houses for Master and Mistress. It includes a monitorial schoolroom based on the educational theories of Joseph Lancaster for 300 boys, which opened in 1837, and a rare galleried classroom, dating from 1853.

== History of the school ==
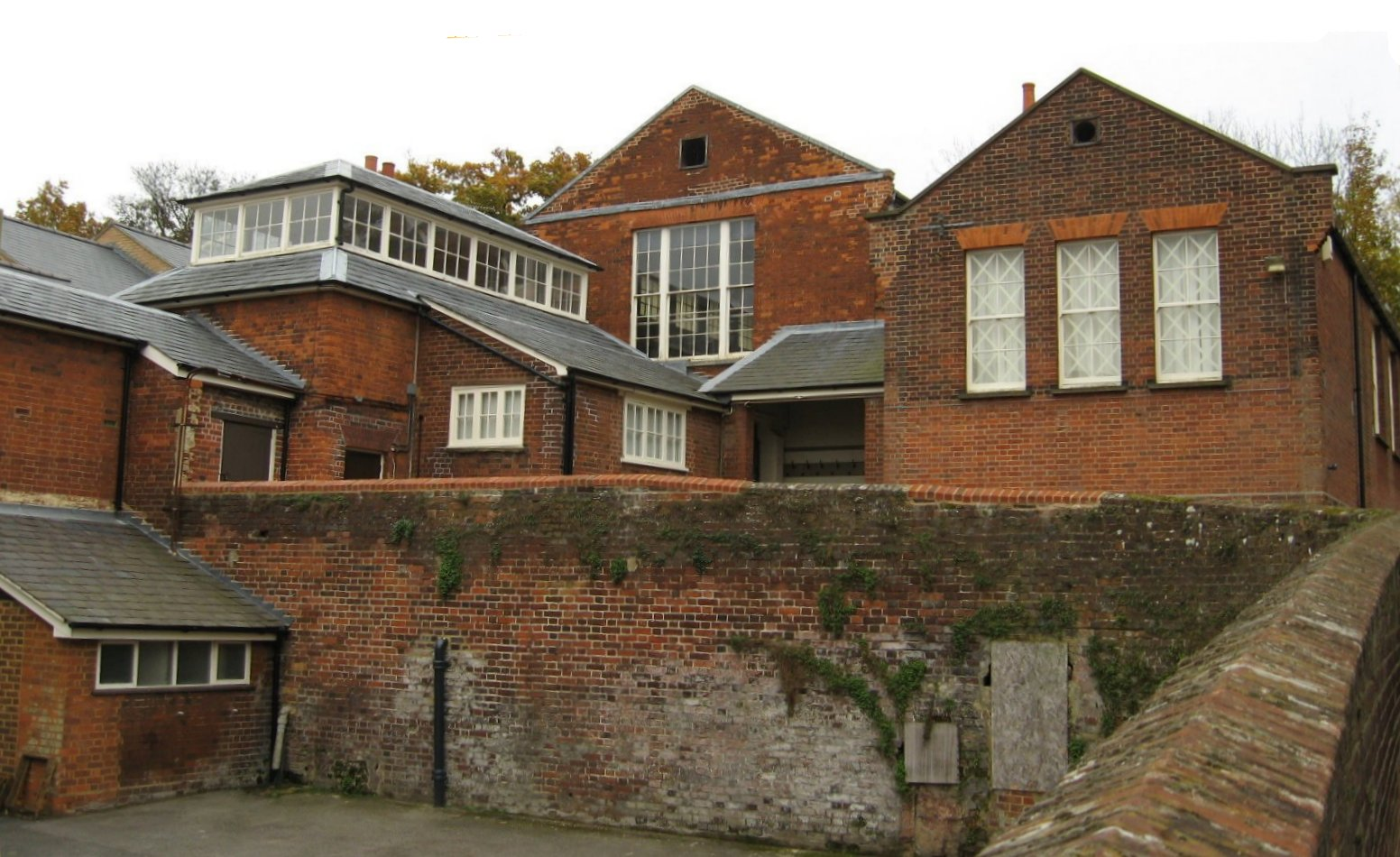
The school buildings of 1853 (left), 1837 (centre) and 1904 (right).

The first school on the site was a schoolroom for 200 boys and 100 girls. It was founded in 1810 by local lawyer William Wilshere in a disused malt house. This schoolroom was the first monitorial school for the sons of the poor in Hertfordshire. It used the methods of Joseph Lancaster. He developed a system in which large numbers of younger scholars could be taught by older scholars under the supervision of the master (for boys) or mistress (for girls). After starting a school in London, Lancaster travelled to promote his system, including a visit to Hitchin.

The school grew steadily and to such an extent that in 1837 a new schoolroom was built that could hold 300 boys. This was completed in 1838, and the original school in the converted malthouse then included an infants school as well as the girls'. Inspector of Schools Matthew Arnold visited the school in 1852 and reinforced the 1849 recommendation of inspector J D Morrell that the boys' school would benefit from a new classroom. A new Gallery classroom for 110 pupils was completed in February 1854.

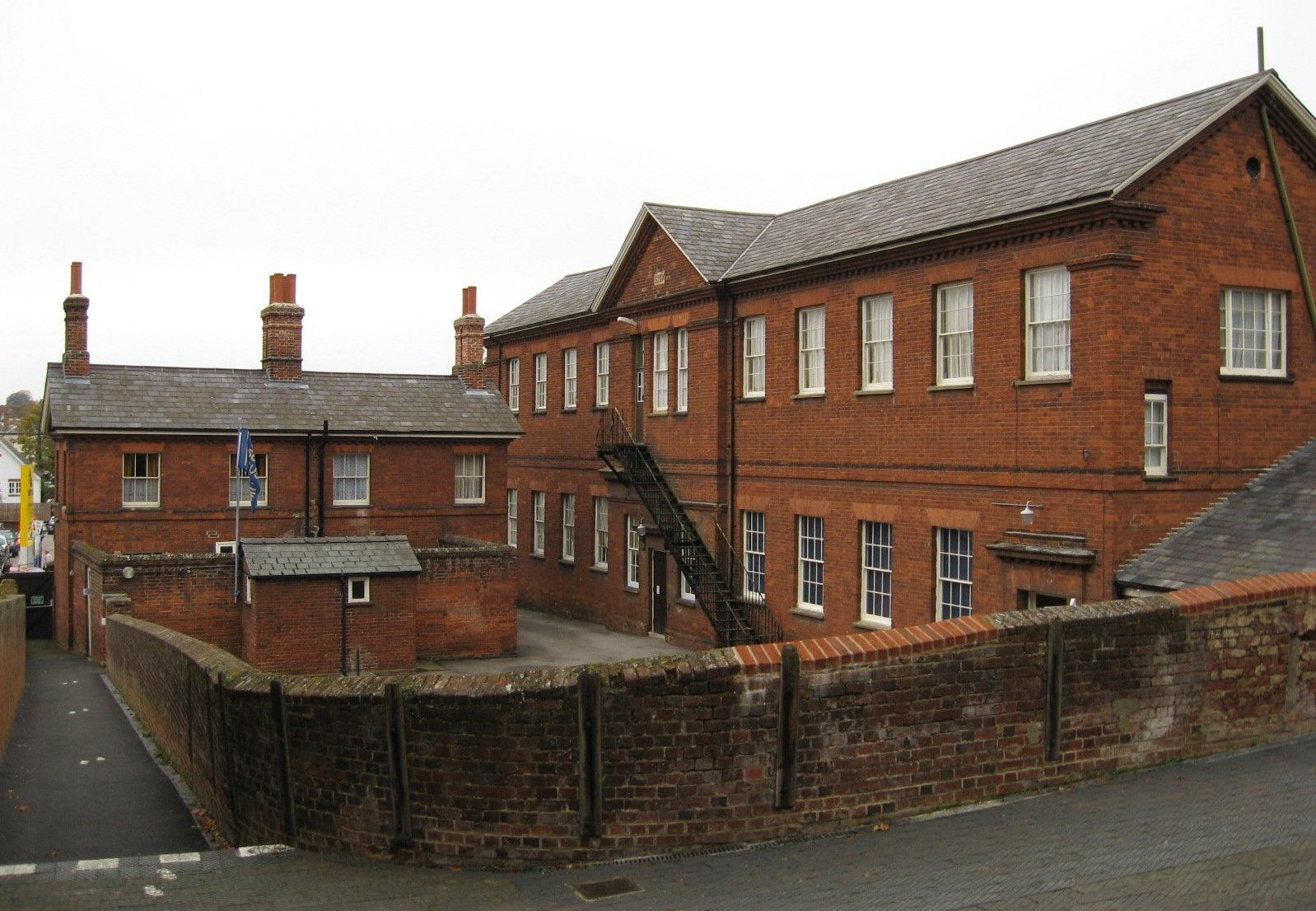
The 1857 school building with the houses for the Master and Mistress to the left.

In 1857, it was decided by the school's Board of Trustees to completely rebuild the Girls' and Infants' School. The new building was completed in 1858 together with adjoining houses for the Master and Mistress. When Matthew Arnold paid a return visit to the school in 1867 he reported that the new buildings were "excellent".

The monitorial method continued until the Revised Code of 1862 that brought in the Pupil Teacher method of teaching. The monitorial system was changed as it was the general consensus that having children teach other children, when they are not well educated themselves, proved to be problematic. The Pupil Teacher method involved an older scholar being given training and being paid to teach. The government hoped that this would increase the number of teachers in the future, using a system that could be described as an apprenticeship in teaching.

By 1904, additional classrooms were needed because of the growing number of pupils. These were built in 1905, but by 1929 it was determined that the school was too small and worn out to continue; both the Boys' and Girls Schools transferred to the new Wilshere Dacre School in the town. The Infants School carried on in the original buildings, but because of the number of evacuees who were sent to Hitchin at the outbreak of World War II the school reverted to a Junior Mixed Infants School in 1940. This school continued on the site until 1969, when it closed, but the buildings were taken over by North Hertfordshire College as the Queen Street Activities Centre.

== Recent years ==
The "North Eastern block of buildings at the British Schools" was listed as Grade II* in 1975 for its importance as a site of historic school architecture.

Jill Grey, a local educational historian, opened a small museum in one of the Edwardian classrooms. In July 1990 North Herts College left the site and Hertfordshire County Council put the buildings up for sale. The Hitchin British Schools Trust was formed and by 1994 were successful in purchasing the buildings. The trust, mainly through the efforts of volunteers, has restored the schoolrooms to reflect their original condition, and work continues to improve them. The museum is visited by adults and groups of children from all over the country who are interested in seeing how their ancestors were taught.

The BBC filmed scenes from the 2010 children's television series Just William at Hitchin.

== See also ==
- British and Foreign School Society
- List of museums in Hertfordshire
