= Henry Dunn (educationalist) =

English educationalist and author

Henry Dunn (1801-1878) was an English educationalist and author of religious books who was for twenty years secretary of the British and Foreign School Society.

== Selected publications ==
- Guatimala, or, The united provinces of Central America in 1827-8: Being sketches and memorandums made during a twelve months' residence in that republic (1828)
- Popular Education, or, The Normal School Manual
