= Frederick John Gladman =

Australian educationist and author

Frederick John Gladman (1 February 1839 – 12 November 1884) was an Australian educationist and writer whose work had an influence on the formation of Australia's educational system. His textbooks were used as late as the 1930s to train teachers.

== Biography ==
Gladman was born on 1 February 1839 in London. He attended a monitorial school until he was fourteen. Gladman then served an apprenticeship as a pupil-teacher at the British and Foreign School in Bushey, Hertfordshire. Later he received a year of teacher training from Borough Road Training College in London.

He had a successful career teaching at a small school in Surrey from 1859 until 1862. In 1863, at the young age of 24, he was given the position of headmaster of a larger school in Great Yarmouth. In 1869 he entered the University of London, ultimately receiving two Bachelor's degrees. Gladman then returned to Borough Road Training College to serve as a headmaster.

Gladman was employed by the British and Foreign School Society, and in his capacity of notable educator, was appointed an Inspector of Schools in pre-federation Victoria. He was an advocate for the Lancasterian System for the Education of the Poor.

== School Work ==
Published posthumously in 1886, this textbook, which had two parts, was the de facto teaching resource in Australian Schools prior to World War II.

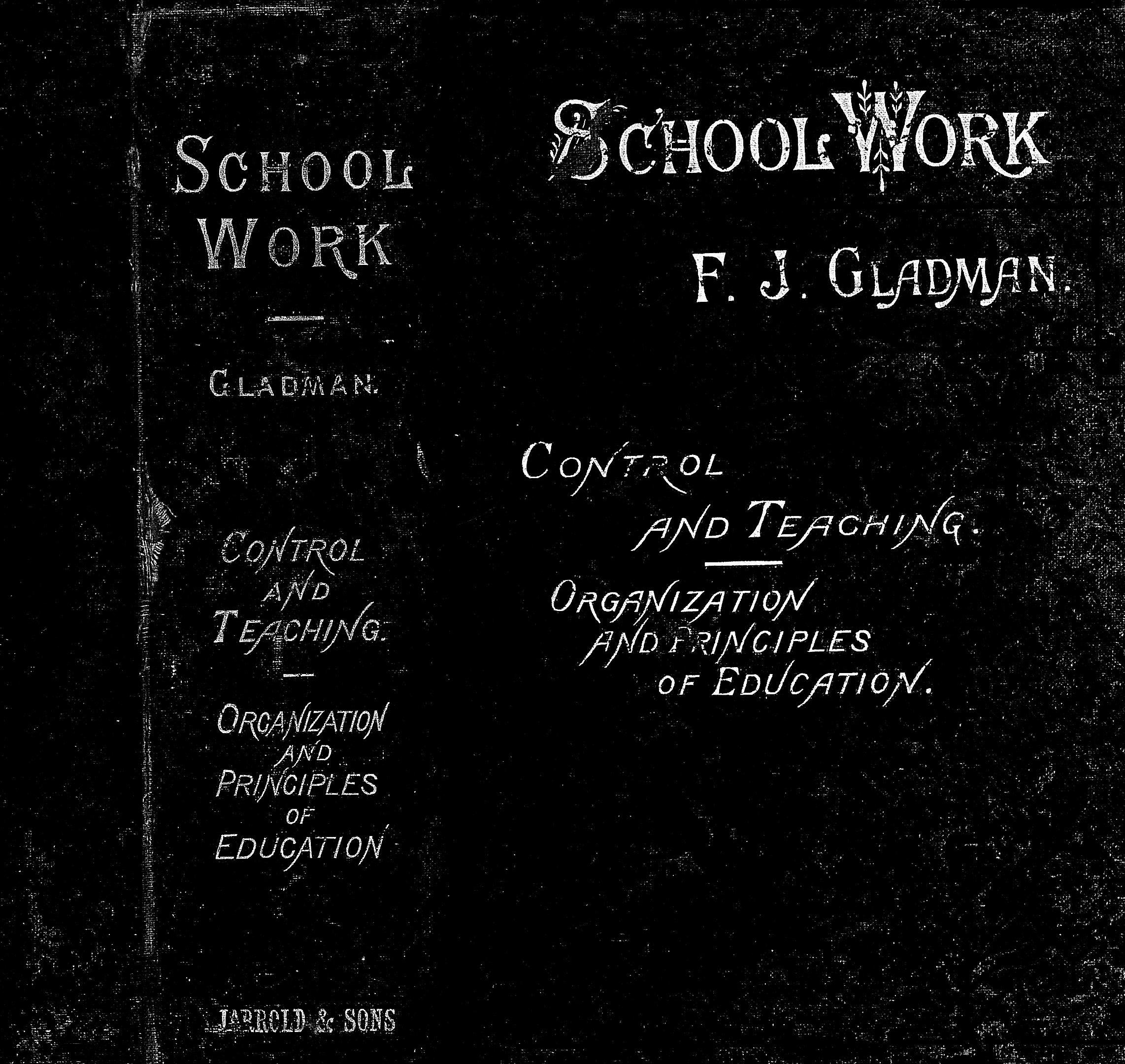
A copy of the cover of School Work

JP Rogers was A High School Principal of the prestigious Sydney Boys High School for some thirty years. He had a personal copy of Gladman's School Work from his teacher education days.

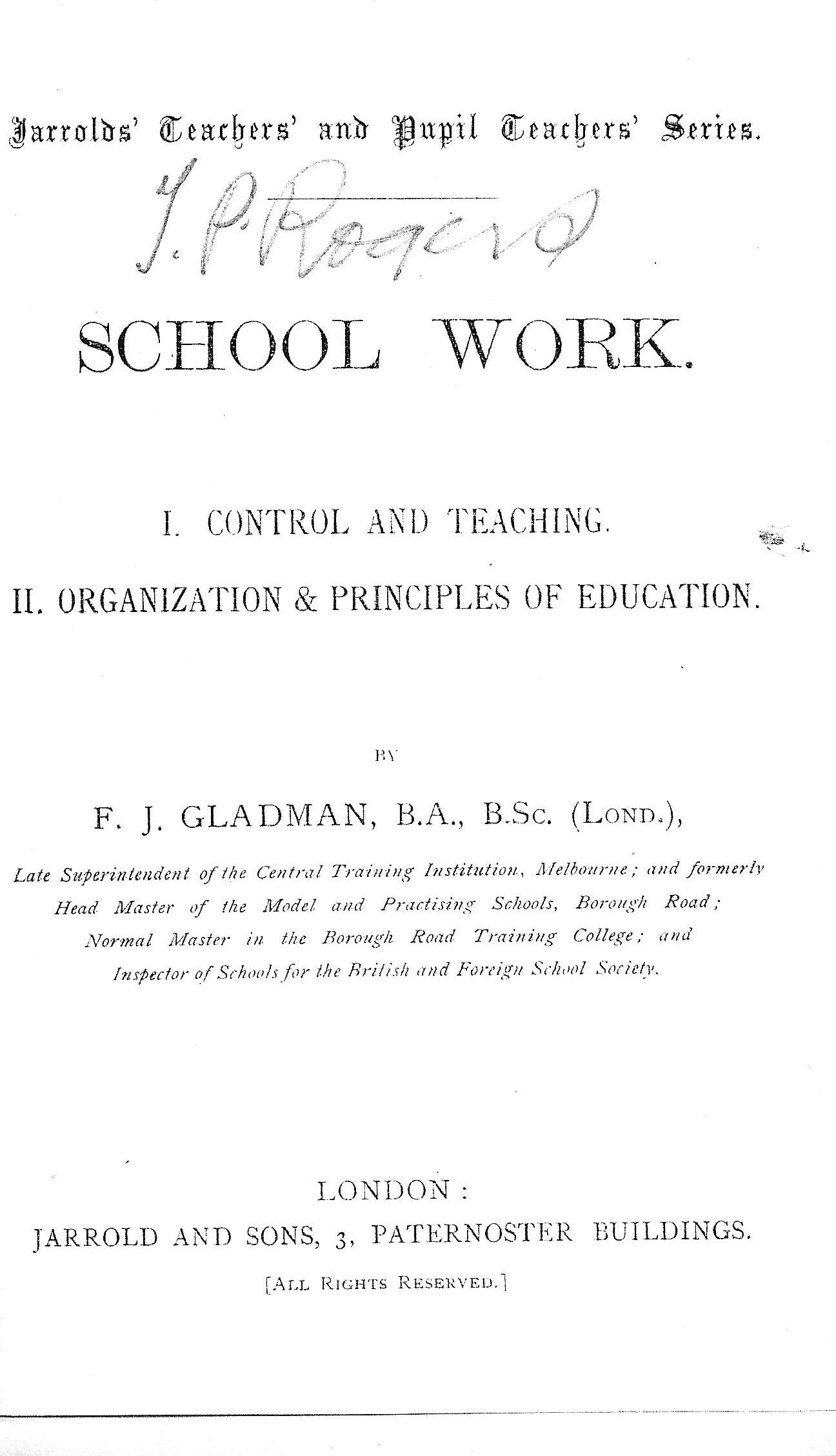
A copy of the inner cover of School Work

The timetables published in School Work were in fold out sections. The small foldout was for small country schools, with populations below 150 students. The large fold out was for larger, city schools, which had a population averaging 1000.

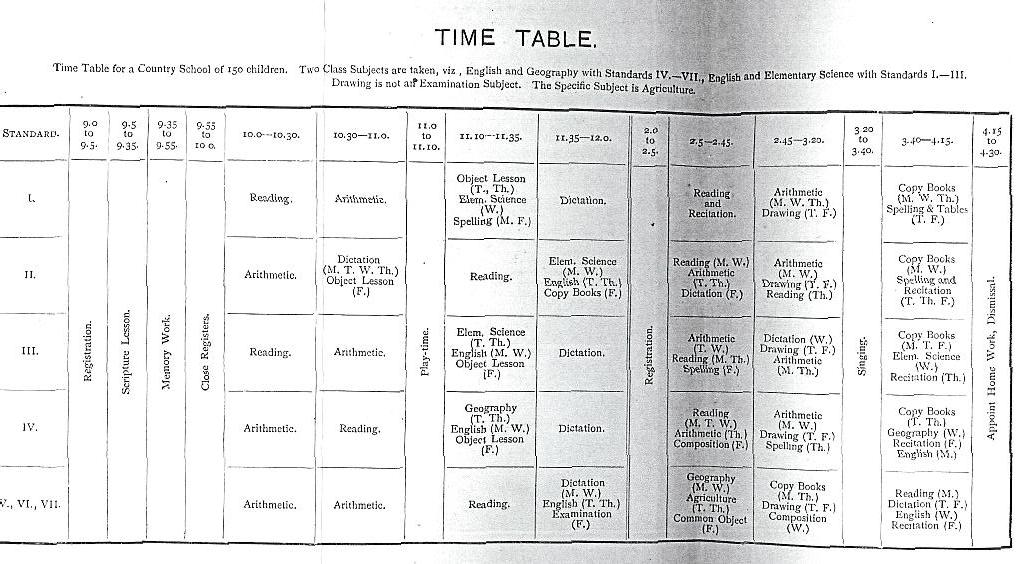
A copy of the Small School Timetable

Schooling in the 1880s was compulsory for all children from years one to years 7, or ages 5 to 14. Different colonies having different requirements.

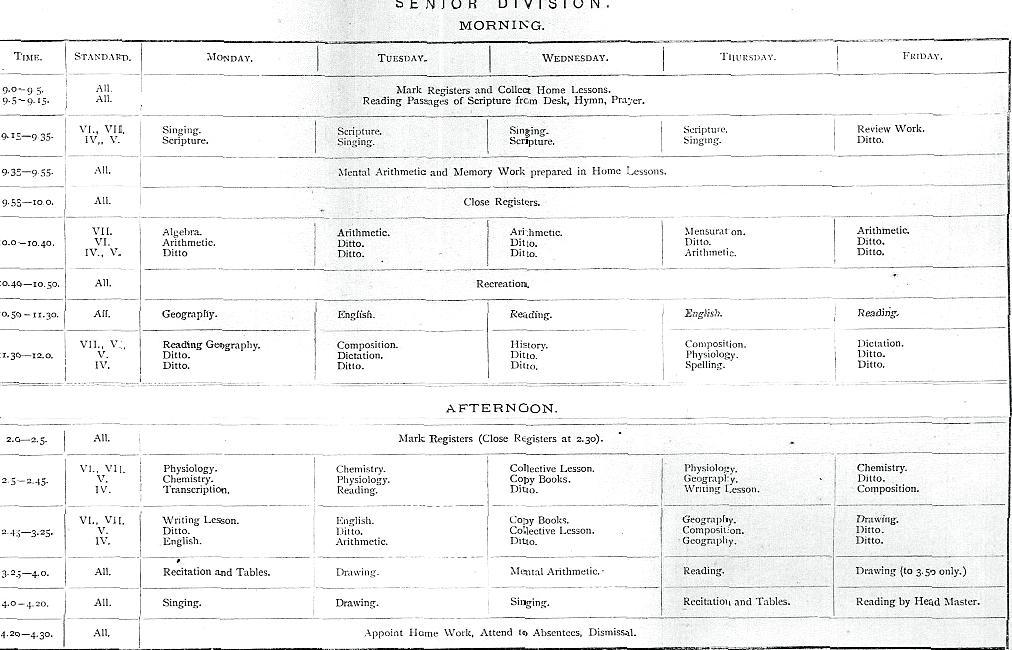
A copy of the Senior School Timetable

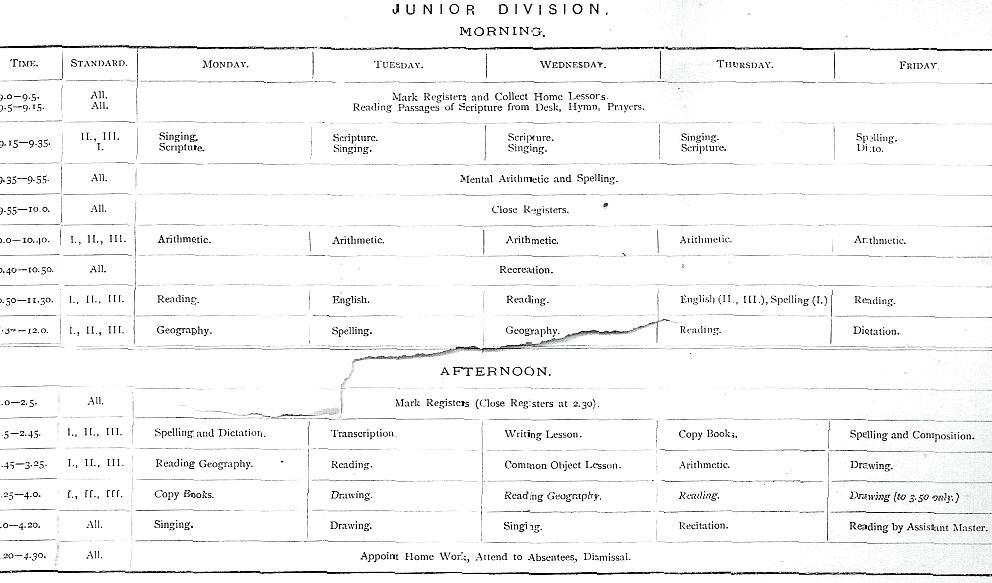
A copy of the Junior School Timetable

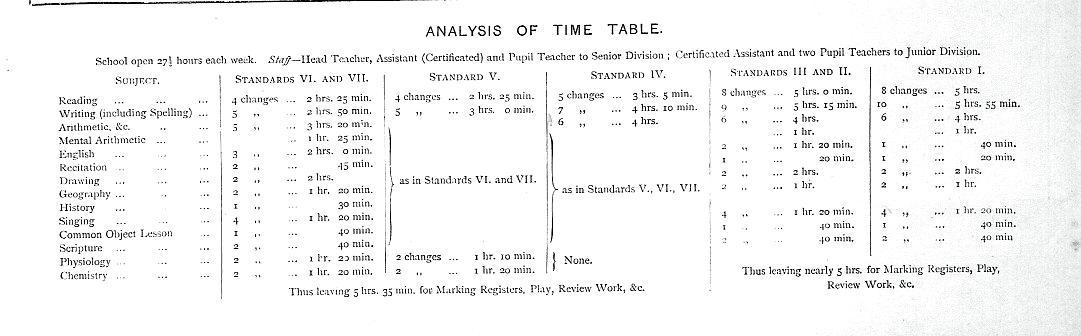
A copy of the analysis of the timetable

== Published works ==
- The Handy Book of English History (London, 1874), As co-editor with Rev. William Legge
- School Method (London, 1877)
- School Work in 1886 part of his Jarrold's Pupil Teachers series.
