= Joseph Lancaster =

British educator

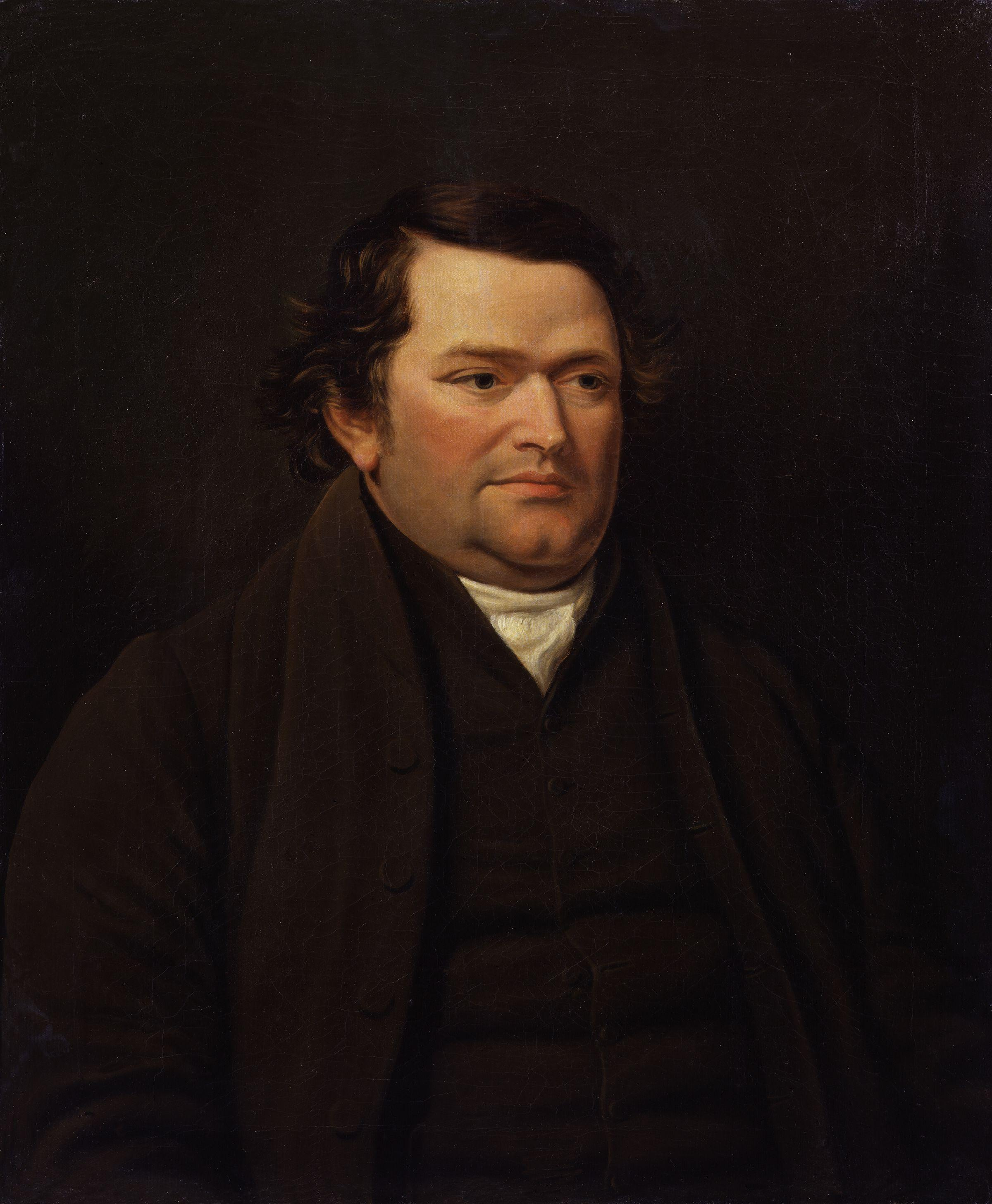
- Joseph Lancaster, by John Hazlitt, c. 1818
- Born: 25 November 1778; Southwark, London, England
- Died: 23 October 1838 (aged 59); New York City, New York, US

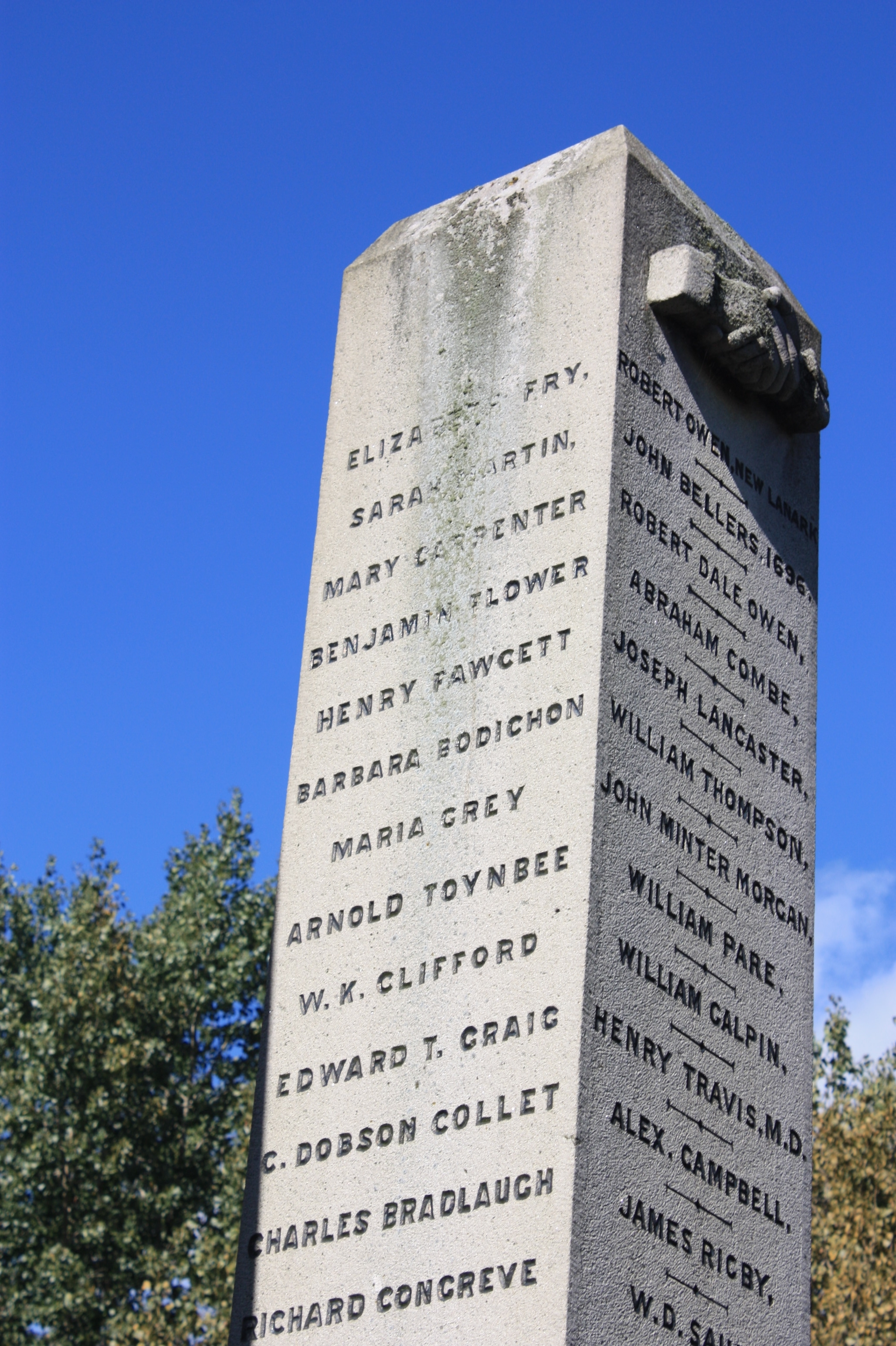
Lancaster's name on the Reformers Monument, Kensal Green Cemetery

Joseph Lancaster (25 November 1778 – 23 October 1838) was an English Quaker and public education innovator. He developed, and propagated on the grounds both of economy and efficacy, a monitorial system of primary education. In the first decades of the 19th century his ideas found application in new schools established in growing industrial centres.

== Early life ==
He was born in Southwark, south London, on 25 November 1778, into a large family, the son of Richard Lancaster who had been a soldier and made cane sieves, and his wife Sarah Faulkes who was a shopkeeper. He was interested as a teenager in missionary work in Jamaica. He is said to have run away from home, and to have been returned through naval connections of the minister Thomas Urwick.

Lancaster joined the Society of Friends, with the intention of becoming a teacher.

== Schoolmaster ==
In 1798, Lancaster founded a free elementary school, with support from his father. He went on in 1801 to start in Borough Road, Southwark a free school using a variant of the monitorial system.

Lancaster's ideas were developed simultaneously with those of Andrew Bell in Madras whose system was referred to as the "Madras system of education". Without wishing to "detract from the praise so justly due" to Lancaster, Elizabeth Hamilton noted they had been also "anticipated" some forty years before by the Belfast schoolmaster David Manson (1718-1792).

The method of instruction and delivery is recursive. As one student learns the material he or she is rewarded for successfully passing on that information to the next pupil. This method is now commonly known as peer tutoring. The use of monitors was prompted partly by a need to avoid the cost of assistant teachers.

Lancaster wrote Improvements in Education as it Respects the Industrious Classes of the Community in 1803. It brought him positive publicity, and the Borough Road school numerous visitors.

== Support ==
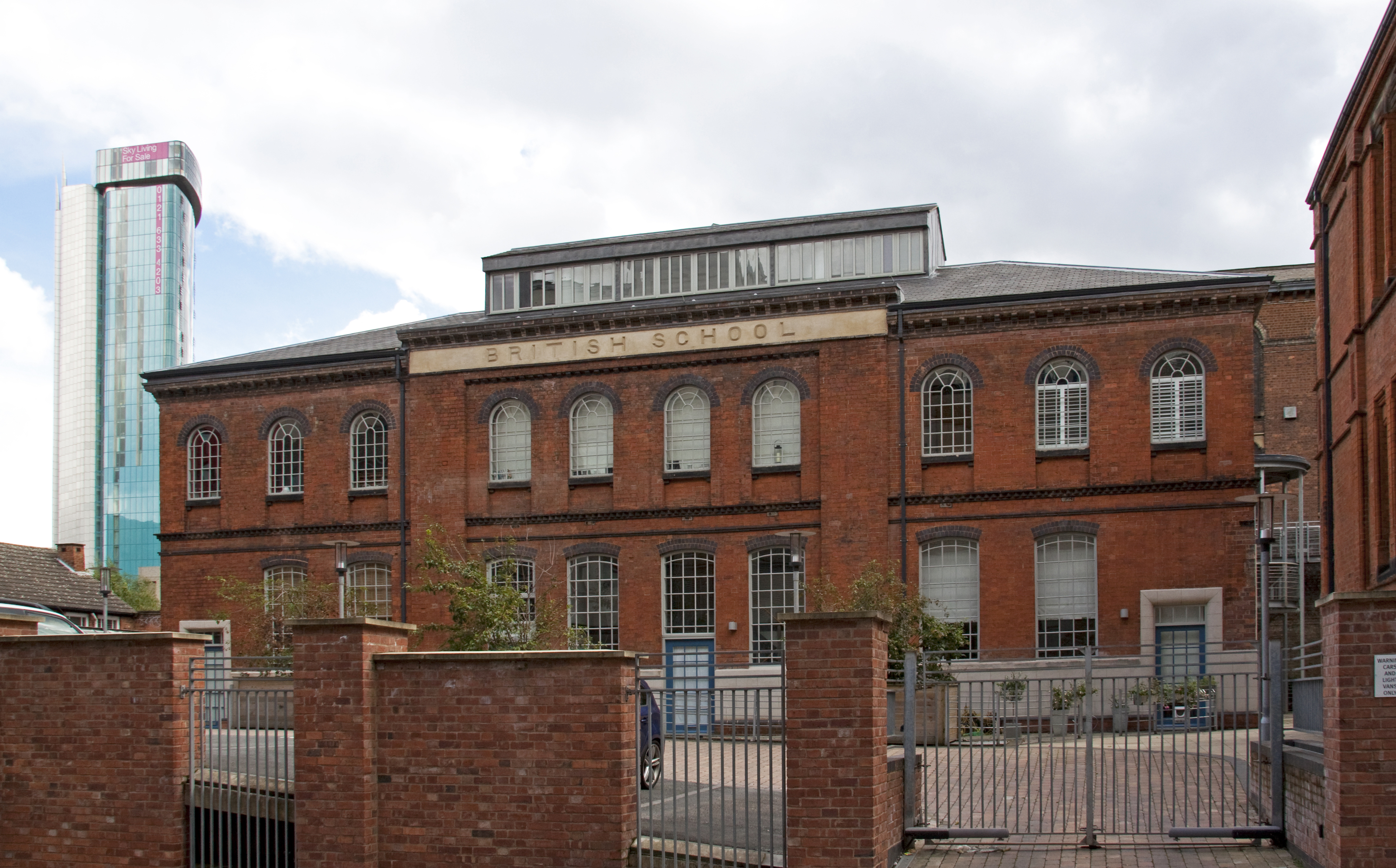
The Lancasterian School in Birmingham, founded in 1809

The Borough Road school called itself the Royal Free School, and Lancaster was granted an audience with George III in 1805, at Weymouth. This apogee of recognition built on the support of John Russell, 6th Duke of Bedford, and involved two royal dukes, Kent and Strathearn and Sussex.

Lancaster's supporters have been defined as "influential Nonconformists, utilitarian liberals and radicals." They included Edward Wakefield and James Mill. In his education book Chrestomathia (1816), Jeremy Bentham supported a version of the monitorial system, for which he gave both Bell and Lancaster credit, but moved from Lancaster's non-sectarian religious stance to a secularism hostile to Anglicanism.

The year 1808 saw the creation of "The Society for Promoting the Lancasterian System for the Education of the Poor". A major figure in it was William Allen, another Quaker, who acted as treasurer. It went by the name Royal Lancasterian Society. According to Henry Dunn, writing in 1848, the others on the initial committee were William Corston, Joseph Foster (of Bromley), Joseph Fox, John Jackson and Thomas Sturge. This group, without Sturge, raised £5600 for Lancaster's school.

Lancaster, himself, travelled the British Isles to advise on his methods.

Addressing a school committee in Belfast he appeared to reduce these to a question of economy. Lancaster described a "mechanical system of education" whereby "above one thousand children may be governed by one master only, at an expense reduced to five shillings per annum". He did, however, make a stipulation, critical in the Ulster context, that pupils should never be asked whether they belonged to "Church, Meeting, or Chapel". A year in advance of his visit in 1811, two schools on his model had already been established in Ulster: in Belfast, and in Lisburn.

The merits of the system was debated at length in the pages of the Belfast Monthly Magazine. The editor, the former United Irishman and founder of the Royal Belfast Academical Institution, William Drennan, prefaced the discussion with the observation that "notwithstanding the public benefit from making man a machine, we cannot help thinking that the personal enjoyment gained by knowledge of reading, and figures, with the uses to which such knowledge may in future be applied, is in itself a value worth a great deal of cloth, a great many scissors, and a great many pins".

== Opposition ==
The context in England for the Lancasterian school was the array of elementary dame schools (typically fee-paying), charity schools, Sunday schools (such as those set up by Robert Raikes around Gloucester) and the Mendip Hills schools run by the evangelical Hannah More. Sarah Trimmer, involved in the London area in both Sunday school and charity school work, and concerned for the evangelical Anglican parent, attacked Lancaster's use of pupil monitors in A Comparative View of the New Plan of Education Promulgated by Mr. Joseph Lancaster (1805). "A Churchman", writing to the British Critic in October 1805, commented that

Granting [...] that a dissenter may teach only what he calls "the leading and uncontroverted principles of Christianity," is it not to be feared that the disregard shown to all religious systems and creeds, may so confound the distinctions between right and wrong, that it may eventually occasion the rejection of Christianity altogether?"

After initial successes, the Lancasterian schools were criticized for poor standards and harsh discipline. Lancaster had rejected corporal punishment, but misbehaving children might find themselves tied up in sacks, or hoisted above the classroom in cages. Robert Southey was an opponent of corporal punishment, also: but he wrote in 1812, after giving examples of shaming punishments listed in Lancaster's writings:

However objectionable the rod may be [...] it becomes a wise and humane engine of punishment when compared to the yokes and shackles, the cords, and fetters, and cages of Mr. Lancaster.

After Lancaster's initial royal recognition, the monarchy turned away in the 1810s, and the Church of England sustained its hostility.

== Controversy and ouster ==
Lancaster fell out with the Society over a number of issues. There was poor financial management, and he was imprisoned in a sponging house for debt. According to Francis Place, a committee member from 1812, they had information that Lancaster had been privately beating a number of the boys. Critics accused him of deism and homosexuality. He was ousted from the Society in 1814.

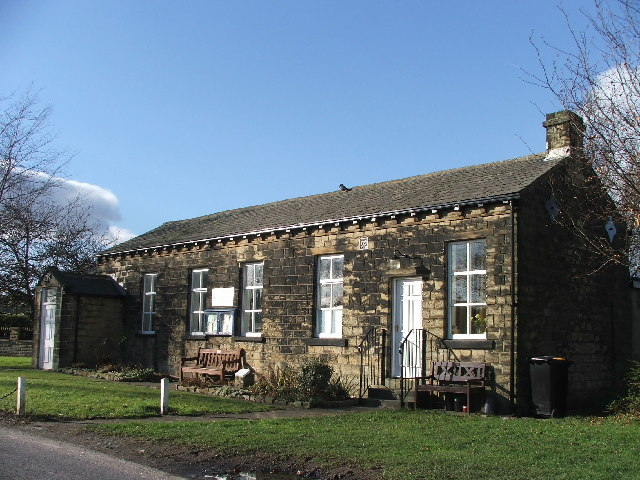
Lancasterian School at Moor Top, Gildersome, West Yorkshire, founded in 1813 and rebuilt later in the 19th century

A group of young teachers had come up through the Lancasterian System: Thomas Harrod, James George Penney, John Pickton, John Veevers, John Thomas Crossley. It was Pickton who replaced Lancaster at Borough Road. The Society renamed itself the British and Foreign School Society (BFSS), a contrast with the Anglican National School System. Lancaster, by then a bankrupt, resented the new name. He still travelled the United Kingdom, lecturing and creating local organisations.

== In the Americas ==
In 1818, backed by the mill owner David Holt and other friends, Lancaster and his family sailed to the United States. He had significant American supporters: Roberts Vaux and Robert Ralston in Philadelphia, and DeWitt Clinton in New York. Clinton had founded a Lancasterian school in 1806, prompted by Thomas Eddy, who knew of Lancaster's work via Patrick Colquhoun in London. Eddy had recently recruited a BFSS master, Charles Pickton trained by Lancaster, for the New York school, leaving no place for Lancaster himself.

Lancaster helped to start the first model school in Philadelphia to train teachers to implement his system. He also started a school in Baltimore, but it was not financially viable. A Lancasterian school was set up in New Haven in 1822, with the help of Timothy Dwight IV, and was run successfully by John Lowell, an American disciple.

=== Venezuela ===
Simón Bolívar, the South American revolutionary, had visited the Borough Road School when on a diplomatic visit to England in 1810. At the time it was not clear how successful Bolívar would be in ending Spanish rule in South America, and the British government did not endorse the idea of independence for Spanish colonies. Visiting England was therefore politically disappointing for him, but Lancaster's education system was one of the things he found interesting in the country. In 1823 Lancaster apparently felt that living in the tropics would be good for his health, and he took advantage of an opportunity to renew contact with Bolívar, who was by then president of Gran Colombia. Lancaster encountered a soldier with Bolívar's Irish Legion, who took a letter for him to Bolívar. Gran Colombia included the territories of present-day Colombia, Ecuador and Venezuela. It was to Venezuela where Lancaster sailed with his daughter Betsy and her husband (Lancaster's wife had died in 1820). They arrived at the port of La Guaira in May 1824. Betsy and her husband Jones moved on to Mexico in February 1825, and did not return, while Lancaster stayed to 1827 in Caracas.

There was a small British community in Caracas. British investors were taking an interest in the area, and a commercial treaty between Great Britain and Gran Colombia was ratified in 1825. However, there was soon evidence that there were limits to what British capital and technology could achieve in what had been an underdeveloped part of the Spanish Empire. The engineer Robert Stephenson arrived in Venezuela in 1824, and assessed projects on behalf of John Diston Powles and other British investors. Before moving to a silver mine in the area of present-day Colombia, he surveyed the route of a railway line between La Guaira and Caracas. Given the topography, this was a remarkably ambitious project for the 1820s and it was judged to be unviable: construction did not take place for decades.

As well as his educational work, Lancaster involved himself with Scots settlers who were brought to Venezuela in 1825 by John Diston Powles and associates. They were expected to work at an agricultural estate called Topo in the Caracas-La Guaira corridor, a project which has been described by the Oxford Dictionary of National Biography as a predictable failure. The Scots found themselves without means of support in Venezuela. Lancaster and Robert Ker Porter, the British consul from the end of 1825, concurred in supporting their relocation in Canada. However, on other matters Lancaster clashed with Porter, who regarded him as an imposter.

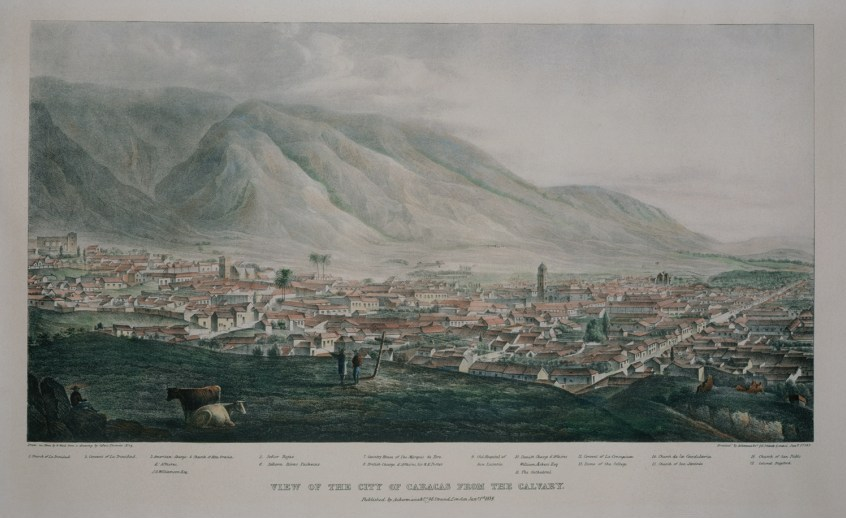
Caracas

Much of the population in Caracas was illiterate and there was a need for more access to primary education. Lancaster's educational work did not go smoothly, however. Some of the problems were attributable to Lancaster himself. His lack of Spanish, for example, impeded his work. Also, Lancaster appears to have moved from his non-sectarian Christian stance to a refusal to teach religion, a position which caused a problem with the council in Caracas. Possibly Lancaster was following the lead of Bolívar. It has been said that the Spanish American elites wanted to reduce superstition and make the population more rational. Bolívar went further than some other South American leaders by endorsing the separation of church and state in his Cartagena Manifesto. However, he struggled to control the vast Gran Colombia, and his approach to religious matters was often pragmatic.

In 1827 Lancaster married for the second time, with Bolívar attending the wedding. However, Bolívar and Lancaster fell out over non-payment of the promised sum to support the educational work. Lancaster left Caracas covertly in April 1827, sailing to New Haven via the Virgin Islands. He left his wife Mary and her children to make their own way back to Philadelphia.

There was at least one school in Venezuela that retained Lancaster's name in the longer term, but the Lancasterian method seems to have faded out in the 1840s. The method seems to have had more success in Mexico.

=== Canada ===
The Rev. Thaddeus Osgood had set up schools using Lancaster's system in Lower Canada, one in Quebec in 1814, another in Kingston, Ontario. Lancaster was there in 1829, and opened a school in Montreal, but his attempts to obtain funding floundered and he moved back to the United States.

== Death and legacy ==
Lancaster died on 23 October 1838 in New York City from injuries sustained in a street accident. At the time of his death, between 1,200 and 1,500 schools were said to use his principles.

The BFSS was widely successful in the early part of the 19th century, but the waning popularity of monitorial methods during the 1820s and 1830s meant that it became a more conventional school society. There is just one remaining Lancasterian schoolroom, built to the specifications of Lancaster himself. It is at the British Schools Museum, in Hitchin, Hertfordshire, England.

== Works ==
- Improvements in Education (London, 1803; New York, 1807)
- The British System of Education. Washington. 1812.
- Epitome of the Chief Events and Transactions of my own Life (New Haven, 1833). See Life of Lancaster, by his friend William Corston.

== Family ==
Lancaster married:

1. In 1804, Elizabeth Bonner (died 1820), daughter of Henry Bonner of Southwark; they had a daughter, Elizabeth (known as Betsy). Elizabeth suffered from mental illness, and died in Baltimore.
2. In 1827, Mary Robinson, in Caracas. She was the widow of John Robinson, a British miniature painter who had moved to Philadelphia in 1817, and had three children from her first marriage. Robinson had been Betsy's drawing master in 1819, and died in 1825.

On 20 April 1824, Betsy married Richard Madox Jones in Philadelphia: he had crossed the Atlantic with the Lancasters, and formed part of the household. This wedding took place shortly before the family moved to Caracas. Jones was trained in the System at Borough Road in 1812, and had then taught at Godalming, followed by a period in Cornwall. He became a Lancasterian organiser in Mexico, dying in 1855. Joseph Lancaster's descendants still live in Mexico: see Ricardo Lancaster-Jones y Verea.
