= Andrew Bell (educationalist) =

Scottish priest

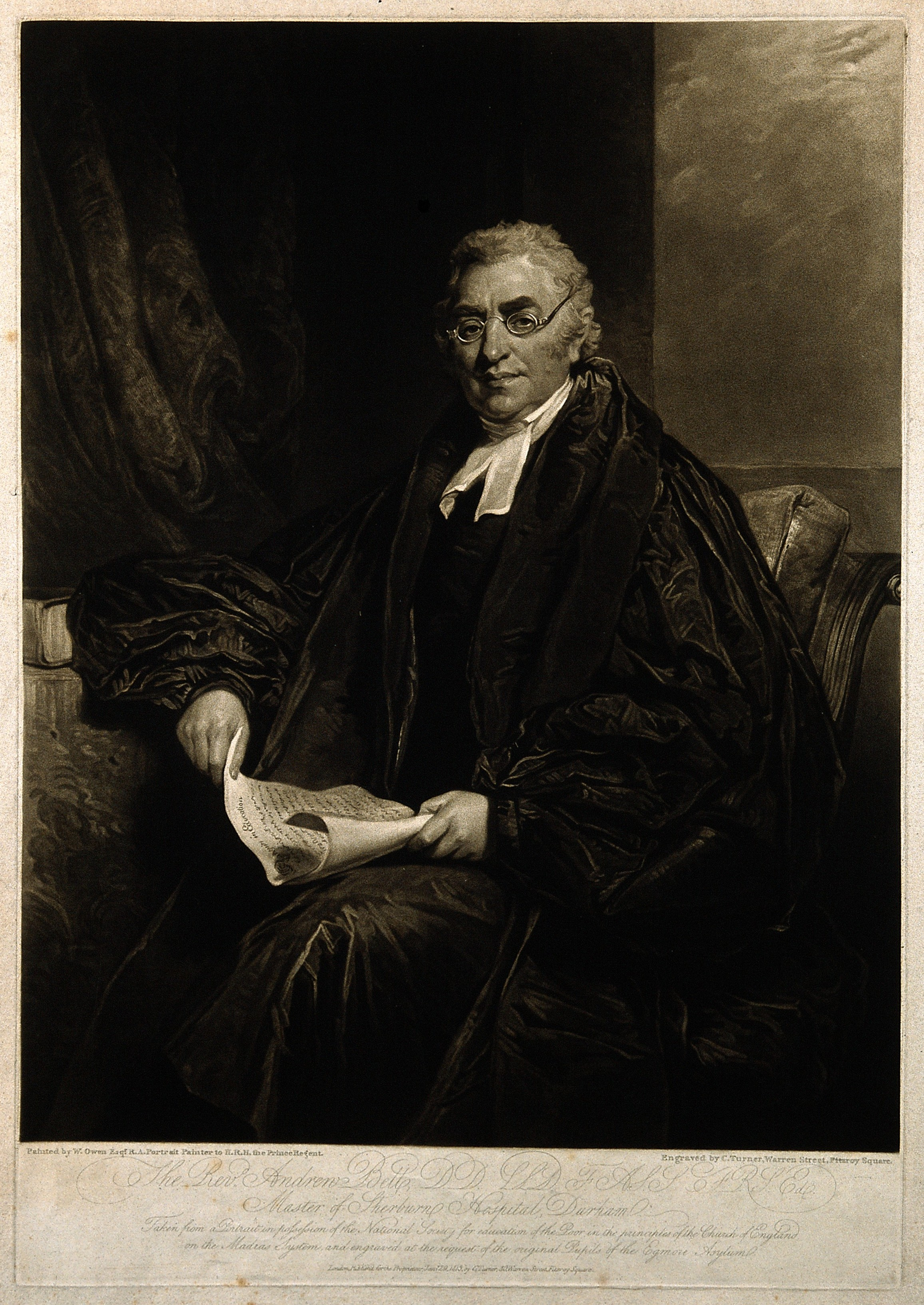
Andrew Bell; mezzotint by Charles Turner (1825), after William Owen

Andrew Bell FRSE FRAS (27 March 1753 – 27 January 1832) was a Scottish Anglican priest and educationalist who pioneered the Madras System of Education (also known as "mutual instruction" or the "monitorial system") in schools. He was the founder of Madras College, a secondary school in St Andrews, and helped fund other schools.

== Life and work ==
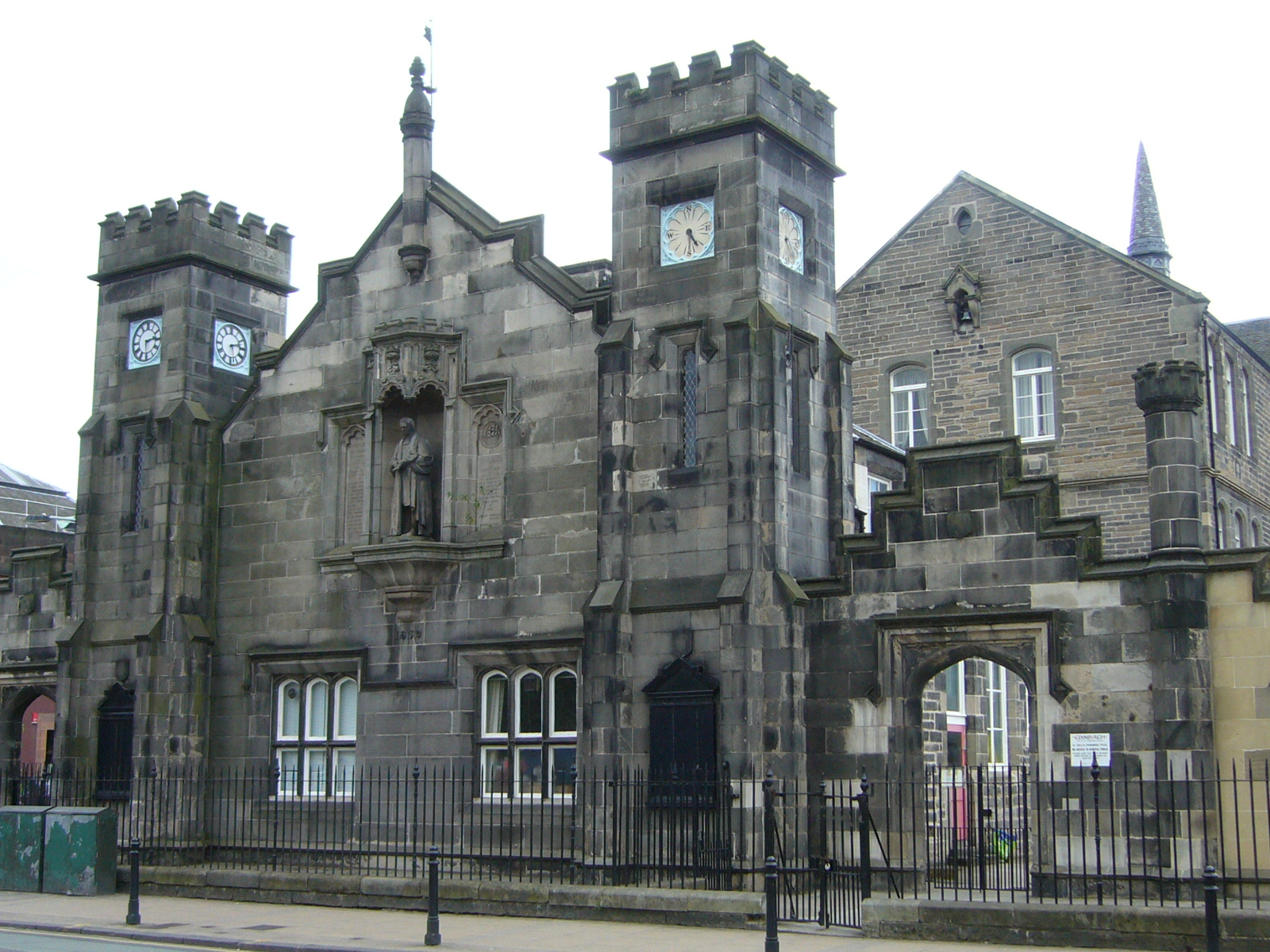
Dr Bell's School in Leith

Andrew Bell was born at St Andrews, in Scotland on 27 March 1753 and attended St Andrews University where he did well in mathematics and natural philosophy, graduating in 1774.

In 1774 he sailed to Virginia as a private tutor and remained there until 1781 when he left to avoid involvement in the war of independence. He returned to Scotland, surviving a shipwreck on the way, and officiated at the Episcopalian chapel in Leith. He was ordained deacon in 1784 and priest in the Church of England in 1785.

In February 1787 he went out to India and went ashore at Madras, where he stayed for 10 years. He became chaplain to a number of regiments in the presidency armies of the East India Company and gave a course of lectures. In 1789 he was appointed superintendent of an orphan asylum for the illegitimate and orphaned sons of officers. He claimed to see some Malabar children teaching others the alphabet by drawing in sand and decided to develop a similar method, putting bright children in charge of those who were less bright. He was opposed to corporal punishment and used a system of rewards.

In Bell's adaption of the Madras, or monitorial system as it later came to be known, a schoolmaster would teach a small group of brighter or older pupils basic lessons, and each of them would then relate the lesson to another group of children.

He was a careful man and accumulated considerable wealth. In August 1796 he left India because of his health and published an account of his system, which started to be introduced into a few English schools from 1798/99, and he devoted himself to spreading and developing the system. He served as a priest in Edinburgh for a short time and married Agnes, daughter of Dr George Barclay in December 1801. He was then appointed rector of St Mary's Church, Swanage in Dorset and established a school there to teach straw-plaiting to girls and also using his system to teach infants. He and his wife adopted the new discovery of vaccination for smallpox and successfully vaccinated many people in the district. However his marriage was unsuccessful and a decree of judicial separation was granted in 1806.

Another educationist, Joseph Lancaster, was promoting a similar but not identical system and their differences developed into a major and continuing dispute. Unlike Bell's schools, those established by Lancaster were not committed to the Church of England.

Bell received powerful support from the Church and his system was adopted in army schools and the Clergy Orphan School. In 1811 he became superintendent of the newly formed National Society for the Education of the Poor in the Principles of the Christian Church which set up schools using Bell's system. For his valuable services he was recompensed by his preferment to a prebend of Westminster, and to the mastership of Sherburn Hospital, near Durham. By the time of his death 12,000 schools had been established in Great Britain and the colonies. The system was also used by the Church Missionary Society and other institutions.

Bell was a fanatical enthusiast for his system and an intolerant man. He was difficult to deal with and hard to work under. Nevertheless, he always got on well with children.

== Death ==
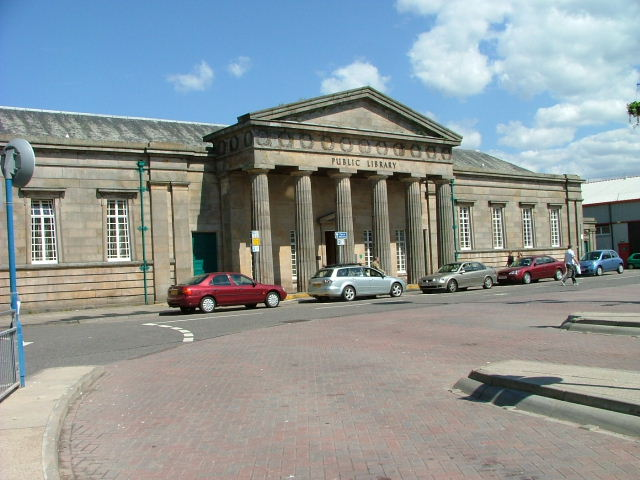
Inverness Public Library, built as Bell's School

He retired to Lindsay Cottage in Cheltenham, a wealthy man, at the age of 75 and died at home, aged 78, on 27 January 1832. He was buried in Westminster Abbey with a monument designed and carved by William Behnes.

His great fortune was bequeathed almost entirely for educational purposes but with what many considered unreasonable conditions attached. As well as Madras College, St Andrews, Bell also left money for schools in Inverness (Faraline Park, now Inverness Library), Glasgow, Edinburgh, Leith (Commercial Street) and Cupar (now called Bell Baxter High School, formerly Madras Academy). £10,000 was also given to the Royal Naval School.

His system did not survive for long after his death. It needed close and enthusiastic supervision and small classes and was only really useful when funds were sparse and teachers in very short supply.

== See also ==
- Bell-Lancaster method
- Benjamin Jesty
- Learning by teaching (LdL)
