= Monitorial system =

Educational method

The monitorial system, also known as Madras system, Lancasterian system/Lancasterism or the Bell system of instruction, was an education method that took hold during the early 19th century. It was related to colonial education systems that had developed in the possessions of the European powers. This method was also known as "mutual instruction" or the "Bell–Lancaster method" after the British educators Andrew Bell and Joseph Lancaster, who independently promoted versions in which children had a tutorial role. Abler pupils became pupil-teachers, passing on what they had learned to other students.

Andrew Bell was an Army chaplain in India, and from 1789 to 1796 held the position of superintendent of the Male Orphan Asylum in Madras, now known as Chennai. He observed the system of pupil teachers that obtained in the Madras Pial schools (run around temples), and which in essence was also the system in the Bengal Pathsalas. He developed the Bell System of Instruction, writing of it "The school teaches itself". It was adopted at the Royal Military School and the Royal Hibernian Military School.

== Monitorial systems ==
The monitorial system was found very useful by 19th-century educators, as it proved to be a cheap way of making primary education more inclusive, thus making it possible to increase the average class size. Joseph Lancaster's motto for his method was Qui docet, discit – "He who teaches, learns." The methodology was adopted by the Roman Catholic Church in England and Wales, and later by the National Schools System.

The monitorial system, although widely spread and with many advocates, fell into disfavour with David Stow's "Glasgow system," which advocated trained teachers with higher goals than those of monitors.

The basic teaching and learning process used in the monitorial system has been used in passing knowledge between people in many cultures because of its low cost to benefit ratio. Numerous institutions use the basic concept as their primary mode of instruction. There have been many observations regarding its efficacy, in 35 AD in Rome, Seneca the Younger, in an epistle to his friend, Lucillus, noted: Docendo discimus – we learn by teaching.

== Lancasterian system (Lancasterism) ==
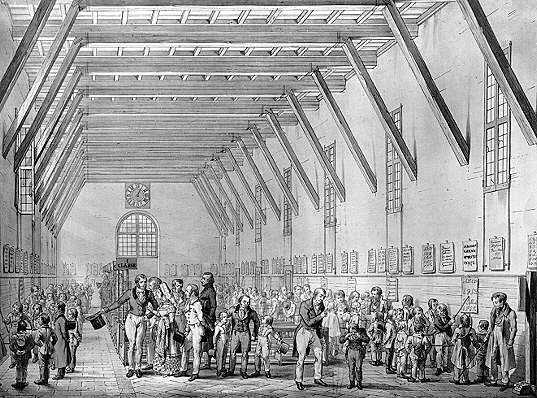
Count Confalonieri and Silvio Pellico attend a demonstration of the Bell–Lancaster method in the Piedmont, Italy (1860s).

Lancaster specified an ideal classroom (hall) as being a

parallelogram, the length about twice the width. The windows were to be six feet from the floor. The floor should be inclined, rising one foot in twenty from the master's desk to the upper end of the room, where the highest class is situated. The master's desk is on the middle of a platform two to three feet high, erected at the lower end of the room. Forms and desks, fixed firmly to the ground, occupy the middle of the room, a passage being left between the ends of the forms and the wall, five or six feet broad, where the children form semicircles for reading.

According to Gladman, to stimulate effort and reward merit, "Lancaster used Place Taking abundantly. He also had medals and badges of merit... Tickets could be earned too; these had a trifling pecuniary value." Prizes were given "to excess" ceremonially.

Frequent changes of routine aided discipline. A code of command and exact movements also reinforced discipline. Class lists and registers were kept.

Children were classified on a dual principle according to their ability in reading and arithmetic.

Lancaster described his system as to produce a "Christian Education" and "train children in the practice of such moral habits as are conducive to the welfare of society."

== Madras system ==
Bell's "Madras system" was so named because it originated at the Military Male Orphan Asylum, Egmore, near Madras. Gladman describes Bell's system from notes taken from Bell's Manual which had been published by the National Society two years after Bell's death, in 1832. "After observing children in a native school, seated on the ground, and writing in the sand, he set a boy, John Frisken, to teach the alphabet on the same principle... Bell was consequently led to extend and elaborate the system."

Bell declared, "There is a faculty, inherent in the mind, of conveying and receiving mutual instruction". In 1796, John Frisken was 12 years and 8 months old. With assistants, he was in charge of 91 boys.

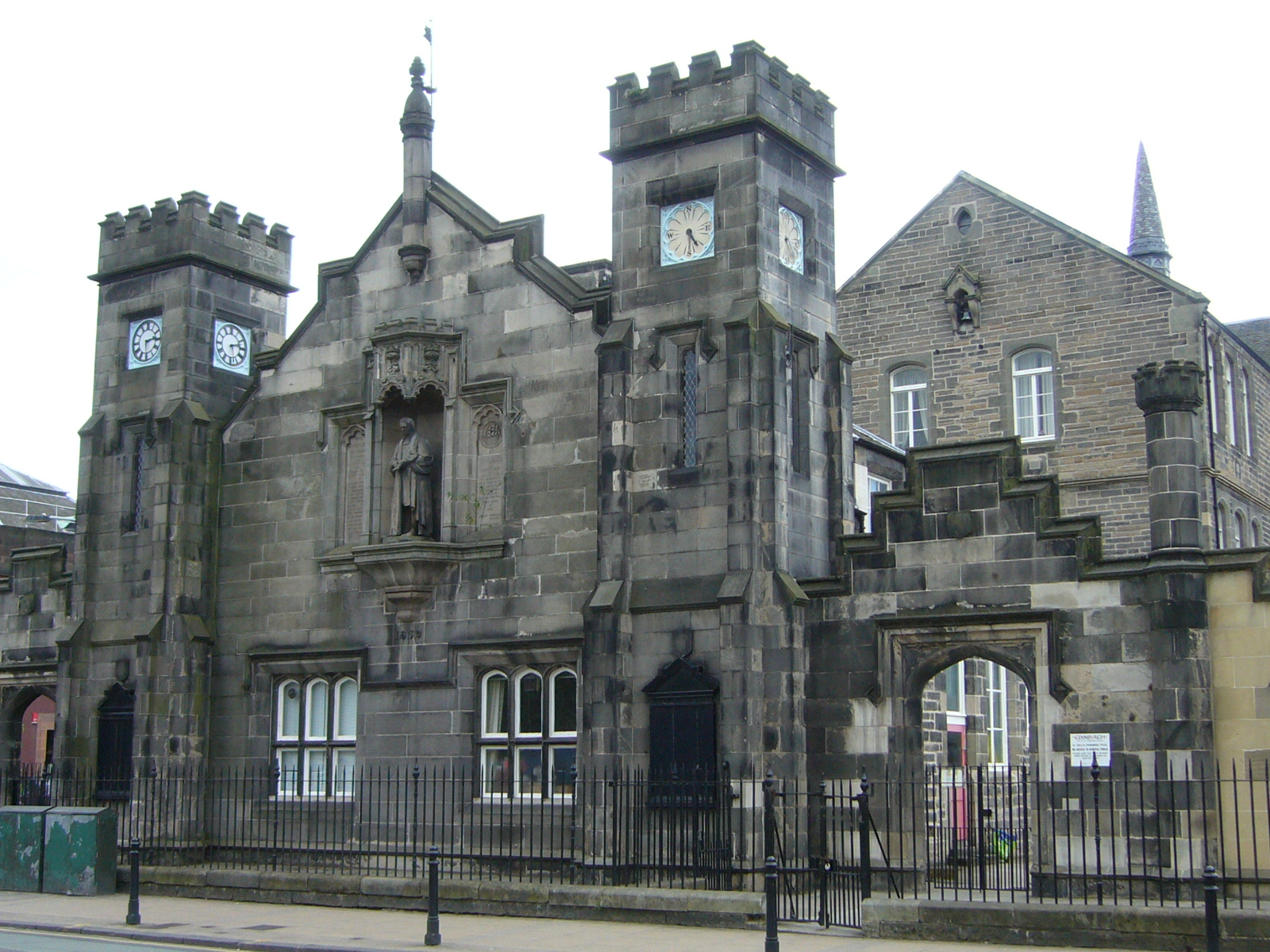
Dr Bell's School, Leith

The school was arranged in forms or classes, each consisting of about 36 members of similar proficiency, as classified by reading ability.

The young teachers were kept to task through registers. Reading, ciphering and religious rehearsals were tracked through the paidometer register. Discipline was held through a 'Black Book', which had entries which were read to the entire school, and the faults were explained in moral terms.

The hall was built in rectangles, with windows five feet from the floor, but opening at the top. Desks were placed against walls, and the Master's desk was raised. "Fixing the master thus, deprived him of much of his power; he would do more good in passing from class to class, and teaching," critics said.

== Comparison ==
Frederick John Gladman, writing in the 1880s, distinguishes between the Lancasterian system and the Madras system. Lancasterism is described as preferring smaller classes, unlike Bell's Madras system.

Despite the many similarities of the two systems, and the initial friendship of Lancaster and Bell, divisions appeared between their advocates. In 1805, Sarah Trimmer published a paper claiming Lancaster's system was antagonistic to the Anglican Church. It was said that the country was soon divided into two camps; speeches, sermons, magazine articles and pamphlets appeared on each side. The National Society was formed to propagate Bell's system and the British and Foreign School Society (B&FSS) was formed to propagate Lancaster's system.

There is one surviving Lancaster-designed British School in Hitchin, Hertfordshire—and this is now run as a museum with an experiential educational program suitable for Key Stage 1 and Key Stage 2 pupils.

== See also ==
- British Schools Museum (Hitchin), an example of a Lancaster-designed school
- Factory model school
- Horace Mann, US proponent of educational reform
- Learning by teaching
- Sudbury model of democratic education schools
