= British and Foreign School Society =

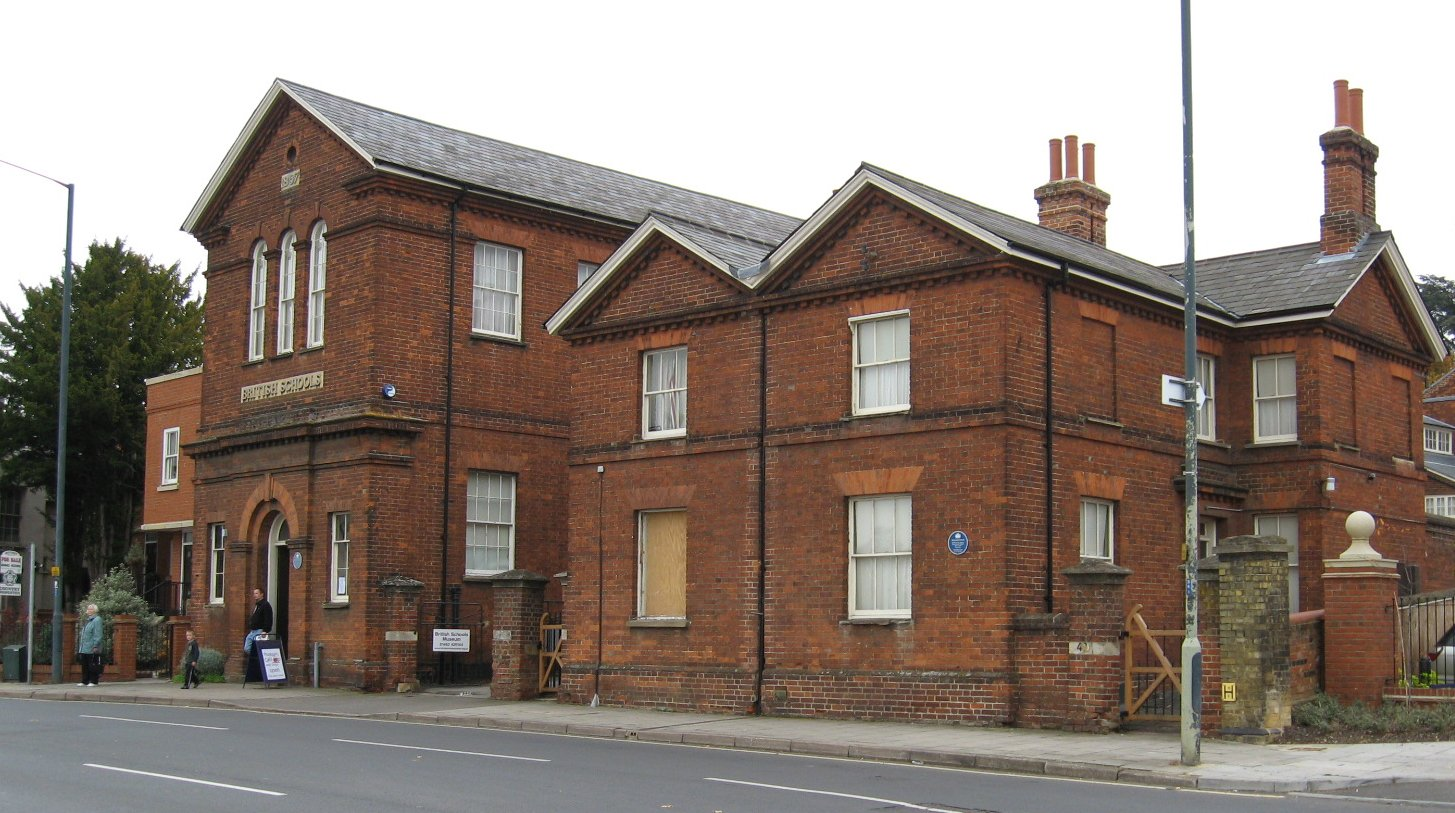
British Schools Museum, Hitchin

The British and Foreign School Society (BFSS) was founded in the early 19th century to support free and non-denominational British Schools in England and Wales. These schools competed with the National schools run by the National Society for Promoting Religious Education, which had the support of the established Church of England, the local parishes, and Oxford and Cambridge universities. Both institutions promoted the monitorial system, whereby few paid teachers supervised the senior students who in turn taught the younger students. After the state assumed responsibility for elementary education in 1870, the "British schools" were transferred to local school boards.

The society continued to support teacher training until the 1970s. Today it offers charitable aid to educational projects in the UK and around the world by funding schools, other charities and educational bodies. In 2024 the society changed its name to Educational Opportunity Foundation to reflect its current objectives.

== History ==
Joseph Lancaster's School in Borough Road, Southwark, London, established in 1798, was an important development in the provision of universal free education for children. A teacher training institution, Borough Road College, was added soon afterwards in 1801.

The Lancasterian system (or monitorial system) used older children who had already been given some education to teach the younger children. It was designed to provide a cheap basic education with limited resources and numbers of teachers.

The Society for Promoting the Lancasterian System for the Education of the Poor was formed in 1808 to continue Lancaster's lead. The Society was founded by Joseph Fox, William Allen and Samuel Whitbread. It was supported by several evangelical and non-conformist Christians, including William Wilberforce. In 1814, the Society was renamed the British and Foreign School Society for the Education of the Labouring and Manufacturing Classes of Society of Every Religious Persuasion. During the 19th century, based on non-sectarian principles, the Society started a number of "British Schools" and teacher training institutions, which in many places maintained an active rivalry with the "National Schools" of the Established Church. It also established schools overseas, helping with the provision of staff and other support.

When the government assumed responsibility for elementary education with the Elementary Education Act 1870 (33 & 34 Vict. c. 75), the British schools became locally administered board schools. The BFSS continued its role by supporting teacher training institutions for the next century, but these institutions have now closed or merged with other colleges. In particular, Borough Road College, having moved from Borough Road to Isleworth in west London, merged with the West London Institute of Higher Education in 1976. This in turn became part of Brunel University in 1995.

== Current status ==
As its teacher training colleges have closed and the Society has gathered more capital, it has used its funds to provide grants for educational projects around the world. Details of its activities can be found in its Annual Reports and the rest of its website.

== Archives and museum ==
The Society's Archive Centre is situated close to Brunel University's Uxbridge campus. This holds school and college records, together with artefacts and curriculum materials with relevance to modern education.

The British Schools Museum is set in a cluster of school buildings on a site in Hitchin, Hertfordshire, dating from 1810, when a Lancasterian School was founded. The Lancasterian Schools were taken over by the British and Foreign School Society. The British Schools buildings remaining in Hitchin include a unique Lancasterian Schoolroom (1837), a Galleried Classroom 1853 and other buildings from 1857 and 1905. The Hitchin British Schools Trust runs the museum for public visitors and for classes of visiting children to sample education in the 19th century.
