= List of listed buildings in Errol, Perth and Kinross =

This is a list of listed buildings in the parish of Errol in Perth and Kinross, Scotland.

== List ==
Name	Location	Date Listed	Grid Ref. (Note: Sometimes known as OSGB36, the grid reference (where provided) is based on the British national grid reference system used by the Ordnance Survey. • "Guide to National Grid". Ordnance Survey. • "Get-a-map". Ordnance Survey.)	Geo-coordinates	Notes	LB Number (Note: Historic Environment Scotland assign a unique alphanumeric identifier to each designated site in Scotland, for listed buildings this always begins with "LB", for example "LB12345".)	Image
Errol Village, The Cross, Market Cross And Water Fountain				56°23′29″N 3°12′55″W	Category B	11592	Upload another image
Errol Village, Church Lane, Former Free Church, (Sanfina Uk Ltd)				56°23′31″N 3°12′44″W	Category C(S)	11595	Upload Photo
Glendoick House, South East Lodge Including Gatepier				56°23′33″N 3°16′31″W	Category C(S)	10975	Upload Photo
Errol Village, High Street, Ardyne Including Boundary Wall And Gate				56°23′27″N 3°12′59″W	Category C(S)	48167	Upload Photo
Errol Village, Station Road, Appleton House Including Ancillary Building, Boundary Walls, Gatepiers And Gates				56°23′34″N 3°12′37″W	Category B	48175	Upload Photo
Errol Village, 1, 2 And 3 Taybank Place, Taybank Stables, Including Ancillary Building And Gates				56°23′38″N 3°12′31″W	Category C(S)	48178	Upload Photo
Glendoick, School And Schoolhouse				56°23′40″N 3°16′27″W	Category C(S)	48179	Upload Photo
Muirhouses Steading Including Boundary Walls				56°24′35″N 3°10′49″W	Category B	48187	Upload Photo
Sandyhall Farmhouse With Horsemill And Steading				56°23′49″N 3°16′32″W	Category B	48193	Upload Photo
Errol Village, 1 - 6 (Inclusive Nos) High Street, Kiersland				56°23′28″N 3°13′02″W	Category B	11594	Upload Photo
Errol Park Stables				56°23′25″N 3°13′15″W	Category A	11599	Upload Photo
Newbigging Dovecot				56°24′47″N 3°11′37″W	Category B	11602	Upload Photo
Megginch Castle, Icehouse				56°24′31″N 3°13′55″W	Category B	10966	Upload Photo
Errol Park, Folly (Troy)				56°23′14″N 3°13′20″W	Category B	48158	Upload Photo
Errol Village, 1 And 2 Croft Terrace Including Boundary Walls And Gates				56°23′25″N 3°12′51″W	Category C(S)	48165	Upload Photo
Megginch Castle, Kingdom Farmhouse				56°24′40″N 3°13′55″W	Category B	48184	Upload Photo
Muirhouses Farmhouse Including Boundary Walls				56°24′34″N 3°10′48″W	Category C(S)	48186	Upload Photo
Seasyde, Walled Garden				56°24′19″N 3°09′53″W	Category C(S)	48196	Upload Photo
Glendoick House, Dovecot				56°23′36″N 3°16′49″W	Category B	13727	Upload Photo
Errol Village, North Bank Dykes, Community Centre (Former Female Industrial School) Including Boundary Walls, Gatepiers And Gates				56°23′34″N 3°12′41″W	Category B	11590	Upload Photo
Errol Station Old Station Including Footbridge And Fencing				56°24′26″N 3°12′40″W	Category B	11600	Upload Photo
South Inchmichael				56°24′46″N 3°13′12″W	Category C(S)	11601	Upload Photo
Flatfield Farmhouse And Garden Walls				56°24′32″N 3°15′07″W	Category B	10959	Upload Photo
Flatfield Steading				56°24′33″N 3°15′08″W	Category B	10960	Upload Photo
Megginch Castle, Stables, Dovecot, Screen Walls And Gatepiers				56°24′29″N 3°13′51″W	Category A	10964	Upload Photo
Mansefield (Former Manse)				56°23′12″N 3°16′39″W	Category C(S)	10974	Upload Photo
Chapelhill, Learig And Viewfield				56°22′37″N 3°17′13″W	Category B	10979	Upload Photo
Errol Park, West Lodge Including Kennels				56°23′07″N 3°13′49″W	Category B	48163	Upload Photo
Errol Village, 1 - 3 (Inclusive Nos) Church Avenue And Station Road Including Gatepier, Boundary Walls And Railings				56°23′33″N 3°12′43″W	Category C(S)	48164	Upload Photo
Myreside Including Boundary Walls				56°24′29″N 3°15′53″W	Category C(S)	48191	Upload Photo
Ross Steading And Horsemill				56°23′02″N 3°16′49″W	Category B	48192	Upload Photo
Waterybutts House Including Boundary Wall And Gatepiers				56°25′10″N 3°10′37″W	Category C(S)	48202	Upload Photo
West Leys Steading				56°24′10″N 3°12′07″W	Category B	48203	Upload Photo
Errol Village, High Street, Commercial Hotel				56°23′31″N 3°12′51″W	Category C(S)	11596	Upload Photo
Waterybutts Dovecot				56°25′12″N 3°10′27″W	Category B	11607	Upload Photo
Pitroddie, Old Manse And Former Secession Church Including Boundary Walls				56°24′26″N 3°15′51″W	Category B	10961	Upload Photo
Megginch Castle, Kennels Cottage				56°24′32″N 3°13′53″W	Category C(S)	10967	Upload Photo
Megginch Castle, North Lodges And Gatepiers				56°24′38″N 3°14′30″W	Category A	10969	Upload another image
Errol Park, South Lodge Including Gatepiers				56°23′15″N 3°13′27″W	Category C(S)	10973	Upload Photo
Chapelhill, Chance Inn				56°22′39″N 3°17′05″W	Category C(S)	10977	Upload Photo
East Inchmichael Farmhouse And Former Chapel Including Ancillary Building, Gatepiers And Boundary Walls				56°24′51″N 3°12′59″W	Category B	48154	Upload Photo
Errol Village, High Street, Albert House				56°23′28″N 3°12′57″W	Category B	48166	Upload Photo
Errol Village, North Bank Dykes, The Birks Including Ancillary Building, Boundary Walls And Gates				56°23′32″N 3°12′58″W	Category C(S)	48170	Upload Photo
Megginch Castle, Wardheads				56°24′18″N 3°13′14″W	Category C(S)	48185	Upload Photo
Sparrowmuir Cottage				56°22′59″N 3°16′31″W	Category C(S)	48197	Upload Photo
Hill Of Errol Farmhouse				56°22′33″N 3°14′56″W	Category C(S)	13728	Upload Photo
Errol Village, School Wynd, Old Churchyard Including Boundary Walls				56°23′30″N 3°12′46″W	Category B	13772	Upload Photo
Seasyde House				56°24′22″N 3°09′45″W	Category A	11605	Upload Photo
Megginch Castle, West Lodge And Gatepiers				56°24′27″N 3°14′05″W	Category C(S)	10970	Upload Photo
Errol Village, School Wynd, 1-5 (Inclusive Nos) Argyle House (Former Schoolhouse And School)				56°23′30″N 3°12′48″W	Category C(S)	10976	Upload Photo
Clashbenny Farm Cottages				56°22′43″N 3°16′17″W	Category C(S)	48153	Upload Photo
Errol Park, Boundary Walls				56°23′28″N 3°13′05″W	Category C(S)	48155	Upload Photo
Errol Park, Walled Garden Including Gatepiers, Gates And Ancillary Buildings				56°23′24″N 3°13′21″W	Category B	48161	Upload Photo
Errol Village, High Street, Victoria Hall Including Boundary Walls				56°23′28″N 3°12′57″W	Category C(S)	48168	Upload Photo
Inchmartine, Walled Garden Including Gatepiers				56°26′15″N 3°11′53″W	Category C(S)	48183	Upload Photo
Murie Walled Garden Including Gatepiers And Ancillary Buildings				56°23′20″N 3°14′14″W	Category C(S)	48190	Upload Photo
Errol Village, North Bank Dykes, Errol (Church Of Scotland) Parish Church Including Boundary Walls And Gatepiers				56°23′35″N 3°12′44″W	Category A	11589	Upload another image See more images
Errol Village, High Street, Dalgleish House Including Ancillary Buildings, Boundary Walls And Gatepiers				56°23′28″N 3°12′59″W	Category B	11593	Upload Photo
Inchmartine Coach House And Dovecot With Former Chapel				56°26′22″N 3°11′48″W	Category B	11610	Upload Photo
Westown, Kirk Of The Blessed Virgin Of Inchmartine				56°26′00″N 3°13′08″W	Category C(S)	10957	Upload Photo
Megginch Castle And Garden Structures				56°24′27″N 3°13′48″W	Category A	10963	Upload Photo
Megginch Castle, Chapel				56°24′23″N 3°14′00″W	Category B	10968	Upload Photo
Errol Park, East Lodge				56°23′27″N 3°13′02″W	Category C(S)	48156	Upload Photo
Errol Park, West Gate With Quadrant Walls, Railings And Gates				56°23′07″N 3°13′46″W	Category B	48162	Upload Photo
Errol Village, Station Road, Primary School Including Ancillary Buildings, Boundary Walls And Gatepiers				56°23′37″N 3°12′35″W	Category B	48176	Upload Photo
Errol Park House				56°23′23″N 3°13′13″W	Category A	11598	Upload another image
Middlebank Farmhouse Including Ancillary Building, Boundary Walls, Gatepiers And Gates				56°25′58″N 3°12′20″W	Category B	10955	Upload Photo
Fingask, South Lodge Including Railings				56°25′24″N 3°13′28″W	Category B	10958	Upload Photo
Megginch Castle, The Long Walk, Gothic Arch Including Boundary Walls And Gatepiers				56°24′23″N 3°14′16″W	Category C(S)	10971	Upload Photo
Errol Park, Steading With Cottage				56°23′31″N 3°13′19″W	Category B	48160	Upload Photo
Errol Village, High Street, Library Buildings				56°23′30″N 3°12′54″W	Category C(S)	48169	Upload Photo
Errol Village, North Bank Dykes, The White House Including Walled Garden, Courtyard Walls And Gatepiers				56°23′37″N 3°12′55″W	Category C(S)	48171	Upload Photo
Murie Cemetery Including Boundary Walls, Gatepiers And Gates				56°23′04″N 3°14′18″W	Category C(S)	48188	Upload Photo
Seasyde Coach House Including Boundary Walls				56°24′22″N 3°09′55″W	Category C(S)	48194	Upload Photo
Inchmartine House				56°26′21″N 3°11′52″W	Category A	13773	Upload Photo
Errol Station, Signal Box				56°24′26″N 3°12′40″W	Category B	11603	Upload Photo
Port Allen Farm Gatepiers				56°22′40″N 3°12′55″W	Category C(S)	11606	Upload Photo
Port Allen Farm Horsemill And Steading				56°22′39″N 3°12′54″W	Category B	11608	Upload Photo
Inchmartine, Ice House				56°26′10″N 3°11′46″W	Category C(S)	11609	Upload Photo
The Horn Farmhouse And Steading				56°25′17″N 3°13′13″W	Category B	10956	Upload Photo
Megginch Castle, Walled Gardens				56°24′31″N 3°13′49″W	Category B	10965	Upload Photo
Ardgaith, Craigie Burial Enclosure				56°23′15″N 3°15′56″W	Category C(S)	10972	Upload Photo
Clashbenny Farmhouse Including Terraced Garden, Boundary Walls And Gates				56°22′30″N 3°16′02″W	Category C(S)	10980	Upload Photo
Errol Park, East Lodge Gates And Gatepiers				56°23′27″N 3°13′02″W	Category B	48157	Upload Photo
Errol Park, Gardener's Cottage				56°23′24″N 3°13′26″W	Category C(S)	48159	Upload Photo
Errol Village, St Madoes Road, Park Cottage				56°23′26″N 3°12′58″W	Category C(S)	48172	Upload Photo
Errol Village, School Wynd, Grey House				56°23′30″N 3°12′50″W	Category C(S)	48174	Upload Photo
Errol Village, Station Road And North Bank Dykes, The Schoolhouse (Former Female Industrial School) Including Boundary Walls				56°23′34″N 3°12′41″W	Category B	48177	Upload Photo
Inchcoonans Road, Errol Brick Company Brick Stacks And Kilns				56°23′46″N 3°14′06″W	Category B	48180	Upload Photo
Murie Cross				56°23′15″N 3°14′46″W	Category C(S)	48189	Upload Photo
Seasyde, Lodge House Including Ancillary Building				56°24′24″N 3°09′55″W	Category C(S)	48195	Upload Photo

== Key ==
The scheme for classifying buildings in Scotland is:

- Category A: "buildings of national or international importance, either architectural or historic; or fine, little-altered examples of some particular period, style or building type."
- Category B: "buildings of regional or more than local importance; or major examples of some particular period, style or building type, which may have been altered."
- Category C: "buildings of local importance; lesser examples of any period, style, or building type, as originally constructed or moderately altered; and simple traditional buildings which group well with other listed buildings."

In March 2016 there were 47,288 listed buildings in Scotland. Of these, 8% were Category A, and 50% were Category B, with the remaining 42% being Category C.
