= Errol, Perth and Kinross =

Coordinates: 56.391524°N 3.213211°W

Errol
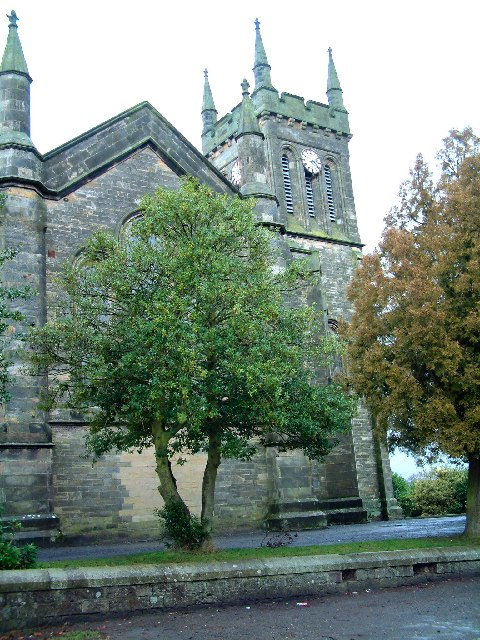
- Errol Parish Church

- Location within Perth and Kinross
- Population: 1,490 (2020)
- OS grid reference: NO252228
- Council area: Perth and Kinross
- Lieutenancy area: Perth and Kinross
- Country: Scotland
- Sovereign state: United Kingdom
- Post town: PERTH
- Postcode district: PH2
- Dialling code: 01821
- Police: Scotland
- Fire: Scottish
- Ambulance: Scottish
- UK Parliament: Perth and Kinross-shire
- Scottish Parliament: Perthshire North

Errol is a village in Perth and Kinross, Scotland, about halfway between Dundee and Perth. It is one of the principal settlements of the Carse of Gowrie. It lies just north of the River Tay. The 2016 population of Errol was estimated to be 1,500 persons, compared to 1,070 in the 2001 Census and 1,311 in the 2011 Census.

Errol village is in the Carse and Gowrie electoral ward of the Perthshire North Scottish parliamentary constituency and in the Tayside Health Board area.

Errol is twinned with Mardié, a village on the Loire near Orléans in France.

Errol has a large church, built in 1831, known as the "Cathedral of The Carse" which can be seen from most parts of the village and from far around.

== Geography and ecology ==
Errol is surrounded by agricultural flat fields and has a prominent attractive location above the Firth of Tay within this setting. Errol is known for its reeds, which used to be collected up to a few years ago to make thatched roofs. These reeds grow in the banks of the River Tay and act as home to a fairly uncommon bird called the bearded tit or bearded reedling.

== Transport ==
Errol lies on the National Cycle Network NCN 77 from Dundee to Pitlochry and is situated about 1 mile (1.5 kilometres) from the A90 Perth to Dundee Road.

=== Prehistory ===
People have lived in and around Errol from prehistoric times. A ring ditch 450 metres (1,500 feet) east of Mains of Errol is thought to be the remains of timber roundhouse visible as cropmarks on aerial images. At Hill of Errol aerial images suggest a settlement, with a rectangular building, souterrain and pits. At Clashbenny there is a standing stone of Neolithic or Bronze Age.

=== Village and parish ===
Errol Parish can be dated back to the creation of a barony by William the Lion granted to the Hay family in the twelfth century. A descendant, in James II's reign, was created Earl of Errol. The oldest surviving parish register of births and marriages in Scotland is for Errol parish and dates from 1553; it is a relatively complete record to 1855. Errol is mentioned as 'Arroll' in William Camden's Chorographicall Description published in 1607 and on Gerhard Mercator's Scotiae Regnum maps published in 1595.

In 1689, following the Glorious Revolution, Government troops arrived in Errol; the minister Dr John Nicolson would not recognise the new government and the religious settlement, which resulted in him being deprived of his parish in 1691 despite faithfully discharging his duties.

William Herdman, assistant to the parish minister, wrote an extensive entry in the Statistical Account dated 1791 which details agricultural changes which took place in the mid-eighteenth century, including the wide variety of crops grown and rentals paid. The land was productive and grain grown was sent to Perth, Dundee, and 'large quantities' exported from Port Allen by sea to Leith and to Glasgow via 'the canal'. The population recorded by Webster in 1755 was 2,229 and Herdman tells us in 1791 it was 2,685; 'of these 1,857 live in the country, and 828 in the village'. He lists the main occupations in 1791 as 211 weavers, 50 wrights, 25 tailors, 21 shoemakers and 14 blacksmiths, but also tells us there were four bakers, three butchers, two surgeons, and a writer (lawyer). To keep them all watered and fed there were seven innkeepers. The parish also had a school and schoolmaster.

In January 1814, during a severe cold spell the River Tay froze and people were able to walk from Port Allen at Errol across to Newburgh in Fife.

The entry for Errol Parish in the New Statistical Account was written by the minister the Rev. James Grierson and dated December 1837. His extensive chapter demonstrates his interest in the local geology and natural history, but also notes the construction of the great turnpike road through the Carse between Perth and Dundee in about 1800 (now the A90), which was connected by branch roads to Errol's local harbours on the Tay at Port Allen and Powgavie. Grierson estimated the population in Errol parish in 1837 to be 2,942, 1,220 of whom lived in the village itself. Of 680 families in Errol, 224 (33%) were employed in agriculture and 374 (55%) in trade, manufacturing or craft industries. The village had a library, a friendly society and a savings bank. A hiring or feeing market was held in July when agricultural workers could seek a new place and set a fee with their employer. The village had three inns and eight ale houses.

The population of the parish of Errol in 1801 was 2,653 and 2,012 in 1951; it peaked between these dates at 2,992 in 1831 and declined to 1,891 in 1931. The total number of households in 1951 was 591.

Groome's Ordnance Gazetteer of Scotland (1882-4) described Errol as inhabited 'mainly by weavers and operatives'; it had a post office, a branch of the Union Bank, two inns, a gasworks, two schools, a reading-room and a library. Fairs were held on the last Wednesday of July and the Saturday after the first Friday of October.

In 1887 Bartholomew's Gazetteer of the British Isles described Errol, a parish with a population of 2,421 people, as 'the centre of business for a considerable part of the Carse of Gowrie' due to its chemical works and an engineering and machine-making works.

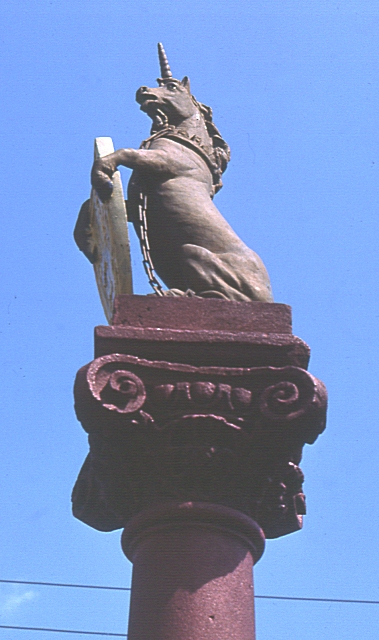
Unicorn atop Errol's Mercat Cross

The water supply for Errol was poor until 1897 when a supply was obtained from moorland above Fingask at a cost of £9,000 paid by Sir William Ogilvy Dalgleish of Errol Park. To mark this achievement, a Red Dumfries sandstone market cross with granite basins and a carved lion's head fountain topped with a Unicorn was erected, with commemorative panels, in 1900.

A local landowner and farmer was the biological scientist Patrick Matthew (1790-1874) who planted a large orchard at Gourdiehill, Grange, Errol. A former student of Edinburgh University, he made scientific observations of his orchards and wrote On Naval Timber and Arboriculture in 1831 which included early descriptions of a process of natural selection. He is credited with being the first person to bring Giant Redwood seeds to the UK. The Patrick Matthew Trail was created in his memory.

=== Errol Park ===
Designations

Inventory of Gardens and Designed Landscapes in Scotland
- Official name: Errol Park
- Designated: 30 March 2006
- Reference no.: GDL00173

The lands of Errol passed from the Hays to Sir Patrick Ogilvie in 1648 when the estate was said to have been lost in a gambling debt. Sir Thomas Blair of Balthaycock owned it in 1652 and by 1741 George Middleton, a London banker, lived there. He is thought to have built a residence in 1745, which can be seen with parklands on the Roy map of 1747–1755, but this was destroyed by fire in 1874. In 1795 John Lee Allen inherited Errol Park; his eldest son, also John Allen, married Lady Henrietta Duncan, daughter of the Earl of Camperdown. The Allens commissioned the notable A-listed Classical circular stables by John Paterson in 1811; which was extended by adding a tower in 1899 designed by Johnston and Baxter. The Allen family sold Errol Park in 1873 to Francis Molison who asked architect Alexander Johnston of Dundee to design a new house. Elizabeth Frances Molison inherited Errol Park in 1877; she was married to William Ogilvy Dalgleish. Elizabeth was the granddaughter of William Baxter, jute and flax manufacturer, and became a philanthropist funding initiatives concerning young women, education and the visually impaired.

Brigadier-General J D Heriot Maitland, who was known as Hamish and served in the Rifle Brigade in the First World War, inherited Errol Park unexpectedly from his third cousin William Dalgleish. The current custodian is Jamie Heriot Maitland, Hamish's great-grandson.

=== Churches ===
The first parish church recorded at Errol appears in a settlement between the minister and monks of Coupar Angus dated 1198. This document related to tiends paid for Carsegrange reclaimed from marshland. On 9 August 1243 a church building was dedicated by Bishop David de Bernham of St Andrews. At the Reformation Carthusians were in possession of the parish church at Errol.

The old churchyard, in School Wynd, was the original site of the parish church in the 1600s; a 17th-century tomb chest of Alexander Omay in the graveyard is dated 1639. Herdman refers to a parish church built in 1765.

Errol North Church was built in 1832, to replace the earlier church, for a congregation of 1434 people. The church was designed by James Gillespie Graham, and built by George Page in Knockhill stone, as a cruciform structure in the later English style, with a lofty square tower crowned by pinnacles; it is category A listed. The parish churchyard has a number of pre-1800 gravestones with carved emblems.

In the 1840s there were also places of worship for the United Secession Church, the Free Church of Scotland, and the Relief Church.

Seceders in the parish Errol who adhered to the General Associate Anti-burgher Synod formed a Secession Presbyterian congregation in January 1759 and met at Westown; their first church was built in 1758 and the second in 1809. In 1796-7 a number of the parish church members left and formed a Relief Church congregation.

The Free Church was built in 1843 by Carles Spence of Rait in a simplified Tudor Gothic style. The foundation stone was laid on 15 August 1843 by Charles Playfair of East Inchmichael farm and it was opened in December. The parish minister left at the Disruption of 1843 along with many of his congregation and used the Relief Church for a few months until their church was ready. Once no longer used for worship, the building was converted to become a small manufacturing workshop.

=== Schools ===
Parish schools run by the Church of Scotland and paid for by local landowners were set up by an Act of Parliament in 1696 and open to all boys and girls. It is therefore likely Errol had its first school in the 1700s. Herdman noted the parish of Errol had a school and schoolmaster in 1791. This parish school was located off School Wynd.

The Rev, Grierson described the parish of Errol as having five schools in 1837. The main parish school had a master and an assistant, whose salaries were paid for by the heritors, and the subjects they taught included English, mathematics, geography and, if required, languages (Latin, Greek and French). Three of the other schools were either partly-endowed or supported by a body of subscribers, and more reliant on the fees paid by the pupils. The fifth school was a small school-house where an 'elderly widow' taught young children to read and girls knitting (a dame school). There were also Sabbath schools associated with the different churches.

The Industrial School was founded to educate young women in domestic skills; among major benefactors were Mr & Mrs Drummond of Megginch. The school in North Bank Dykes was built in 1855 to a design by Hay of Liverpool and is B listed. It opened in 1856 and the first teacher was Miss Euphemia Pugh. A commemorative panel on the former school house reads 'This Building for a Female Industrial School was erected through the Exertions of the Rev. John Caird minister of the Parish of Errol aided by many friends.' John Caird was minister or Errol from 1849 to 1857 and went on to become a noted theologian, professor at and then principal of the University of Glasgow. Errol Female Industrial School records exist from 1857 to 1914. Lady Elizabeth Ogilvy Dalgleish was secretary to the ladies’ committee for thirty years. It ceased to be an industrial school in 1914 and was taken over by the Education Authority in 1918. The building was used by the local education authority as an infant school to the mid-1970s. It is now a community centre.

The Education (Scotland) Act 1872 placed local control and funding of schools in the hands of school boards. The local authority School Board building in Station Road is estimated to have been built around 1925, although the O.S. map from 1898 shows a school on this site. The main building was added to in the post-1944 Act period by a number of HORSA huts to meet accommodation needs following raising of the compulsory education age to 15 years. In the 1960s these huts accommodated the kitchen and dining facilities as well as classrooms. In the mid-1970s the secondary education department closed and secondary pupils travelled to Perth.

=== Port Allen ===
Port Allen has been known by different names including Miln of Errol, Errol Pow and Harbour of Errol. It was granted a charter in 1662 and had its own meal mill, replaced with a horsemill by the 1870s. It is estimated around 200 people lived there in 1700s. The piers at Port Allen were associated with a toll house and an Inn (now a farmhouse). Herdman noted in 1791 that large quantities of grain were shipped from this port. 'Pow of Erroll' and the mill can clearly be seen on the Roy Military Survey map of 1747-1755 [grid ref NO 258 209]. The O.S. six-inch first edition map of 1861 shows a pier and pier crane associated with the port, and water-driven corn and barley mill with a dam and lead.

=== Errol aerodrome ===
The pioneer Scottish aviator Preston Watson is associated with the early days of the airfield in the 1900s, which is located on flat land between Errol village and the hamlet of the Grange. After the outbreak of the Second World War in 1939, the Ministry of Defence requisitioned the land from local farmers and the aerodrome opened as an RAF station for training pilots on 1 August 1942. Errol aerodrome was in military use until the summer of 1948; material was brought in by transport planes with loading and unloading carried out by German prisoners of war held in camps nearby. From the late 1940s Errol was proposed as an airport but met with objections and the airfield was sold in 1961. In 1988 the RAF Errol Airfield was purchased by Morris Leslie to start auctioning plant and is now a mixed use business park and the Morris Leslie Group's headquarters. The main runway continues to be used for aviation.

=== Inchcoonans tile and brick works ===
It is thought a clay works of some kind has operated at Errol for centuries; using local alluvial clay to make bricks was introduced by the Romans and revived in the sixteenth century. The site features two Beehive kilns, which are the only remaining examples of their kind in Scotland, and are category B listed. Inchcoonans Tile Works opened in 1855 producing mainly bricks for building and field drainage tiles. From the 1870s it was operated by the Pitfour Patent Brick and Tile Co., and from 1910 by A. Fraser Ltd.of Anniston Brickworks, Angus, until 1990. It was reopened in 1994 by Errol Brick, but was mothballed in March 2008.

=== Errol railway station ===
The Dundee and Perth and Aberdeen Railway Junction Company opened Errol railway station in 1847, which by 1863 had become the Scottish Central Railway and subsequently in 1865 part of the Caledonian Railway. The line took a direct route and thus the station is north of the village at a separate hamlet. The first station master was Thomas Jagger and the last left Errol in 1976; the station finally closed on 28 September 1985. The station is B-listed and was sold to Errol Station Trust and opened as The Railway Heritage Centre in May 1990, winning the Railway Preservation Societies/Ian Allan Premier Award for Best Preserved Station in Britain that same year. By 2000 the museum had closed, and the buildings were later converted for residential use.

== Present-day Errol ==
Errol is still known for its local factory; the brick factory premises have been taken over and modernised by the Mackie's company as a potato crisp manufacturing plant, which used to incorporate a "factory shop", but this has since closed.

Errol also has a scenic farm track to walk or bike down, right beside the River Tay. While walking down the track you will find a rope swing which almost swings over a tidal mud flat. This tidal mud flat was for many years a tidal lagoon enclosed and protected from the firth, by a "bund" (or dyke). This became a more free-draining tidal mud-flat in one of the big storms of late 2023 when the bund was breached and broken. It is thought that for some time, this lagoon had previously been an area of agricultural land that had been (temporarily) reclaimed from the sea. The area around Errol: both to the south and the river and to the north with its walks are good spots for walking dogs.

Errol Park house and gardens is currently used as a wedding venue and filming location. Errol Estate is an agricultural enterprise around the village of Errol extending to around 3,500 acres of productive farmland and woodland adjacent to the River Tay estuary. It is operated by Errol Enterprises Ltd (EEL).

The main runway of Errol Aerodrome is used for commercial and recreational aviation and the surroundings for drone flying. The old airfield also hosts the Errol car boot sale and market, run by the Morris Leslie group, which claims to be 'Scotland's premier Sunday market'. The Morris Leslie group also hold auctions at the former airfield.

Errol School is a primary school with eight primary classes and a large nursery class; it was last extended in April 2017 to cope with increased numbers of pupils.

Errol has two general grocery shops; other local amenities include a chip shop, a pub, a community centre, a pharmacy and a hairdresser. The post office closed in 2023, after the owners retired. The Lass O'Gowrie Cafe opened within the village in the old Picture House at the tail-end of the Covid pandemic in 2022.

The local winery Cairn O'Mohr has won many awards for its wines made from local produce such as oak sap, rhubarb and brambles and is situated on the same farmyard at East Inchmichael Farm as Gillies & Mackay Ltd, a local shed company.

The paths in the path network around Errol are many and varied, with the most popular for leisure use probably being the Gas Brae path down to the river and the reed beds. Some of these paths belong to the Perth & Kinross Council Core Path Network. Maintenance is carried out by a combination of individual volunteers, the local land-owners such as Errol Park, and an organisation called Carse of Gowrie Group (CoGG). Expansion of the path network (as of 2020) remains an aspiration by the community.

On 27 April 2020, during a prolonged dry spell of weather, the River Tay reed beds at Errol caught fire and almost 2 miles (3 kilometres) of reeds were lost destroying the nests of rare bearded tits and marsh harriers. A local pilot dropped 77,000 litres of water from the river on the heart of the fire in an operation involving nine appliances directed by the Scottish Fire and Rescue Service.
