= National Cycle Route 77 =

Cycle route in the United Kingdom

National Cycle Route 77 runs from Dundee to Pitlochry via Perth. It is often known as The Salmon Run cycle route.

== Route ==
=== Dundee to Perth ===
From Dundee, the route passes through Invergowrie before running alongside the A90 until Longforgan. It then uses minor roads to Errol, before following the C484 to St Madoes.

Here, the route crosses the A90 into Glencarse then up the challenging Kinnoull Hill. The route reaches the eastern edge of Perth towards the foot of the hill, with the town centre reached via Smeaton's Bridge.

=== Perth to Dunkeld ===
This section passes through the villages of Almondbank and Bankfoot, and enters Dunkeld through Birnam.

=== Dunkeld to Pitlochry ===
On this section of the route, the River Tay is followed more closely, and is crossed a couple of times. At Pitlochry the route meets NCR 7.
