= On Naval Timber and Arboriculture =

1831 book by Patrick Matthew

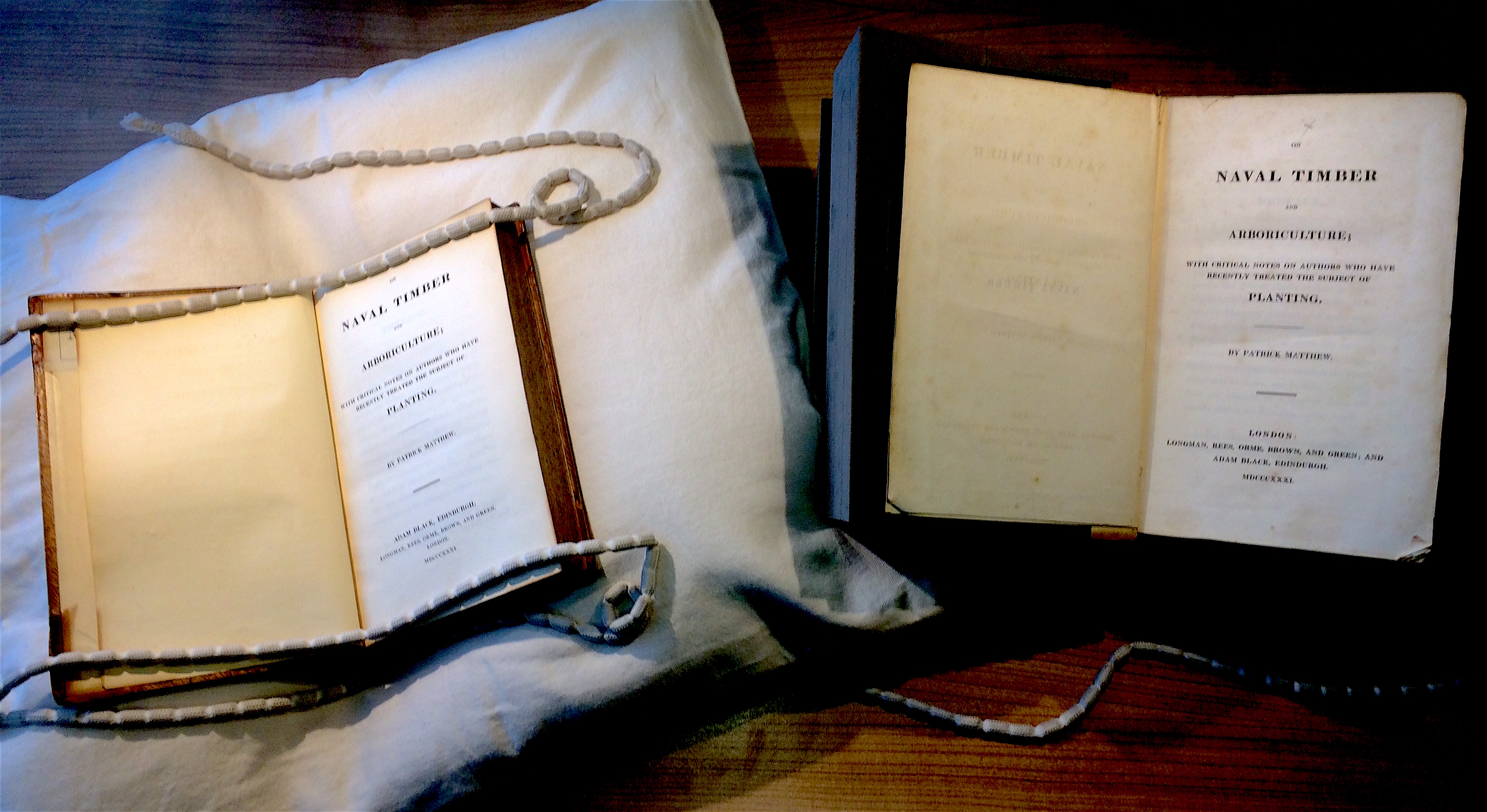
- Two copies of Matthew (1831) held at National Library of Scotland.
- Author: Patrick Matthew
- Language: English
- Genre: Non-fiction
- Publication date: 1831

On Naval Timber and Arboriculture: With Critical Notes on Authors who Have Recently Treated the Subject of Planting is a book by Patrick Matthew published in 1831. It is noted for parts of its appendices in which Matthew discusses natural selection, 28 years prior to Charles Darwin's publication of On the Origin of Species.

== Synopsis ==
The book On Naval Timber and Arboriculture; with critical notes on authors who have recently treated the subject of planting by Patrick Matthew (1831) is not one long argument, but a jumble of issues. The book is divided into an Introduction followed by four different Parts and an Appendix consisting of Notes A to F that have been too long to be included as footnotes in the main text. That is, the main text has footnotes, but some of these refer to one of the notes A to F in the appendix. Parts I to IV are subdivided in various sections or chapters that sometimes also have roman numerals, so that Part I has sections I and II and Part VI has chapters I to VII.

The introduction
A praise of war and the marine and how all that needs naval timber. Matthew also starts with a disagreement with the law of entail.
Part I. – Structure of Vessels
Part I is about planks (the skin) and timbers (the skeleton) of vessels. It details what wood is required for planks and timbers and how the trees should be treated, in order to yield the required wood.
Part II. – British Forest Trees used as Naval Timber
While Matthew stresses the variability among individuals within tree species, the main purpose of this part is to inform potential tree planters about the most suitable species or varieties for timber or plank production.
Part III. – Miscellaneous Matter connected with Naval Timber
This part begins with a chapter on Nurseries.
Part IV. – Notices of Authors who treat of Arboriculture
This is the longest part of the book, which also gained its own subtitle in: "On Naval Timber and Arboriculture; with critical notes on authors who have recently treated the subject of planting." In it Matthew reviews the treatises of earlier scholars on arboriculture.

Note A section trumpets the patriotism again. Note B starts with the idea of natural selection, but quickly drifts into a rant against the law of entail. Note C contains Matthews comments on races of humans, speculating about changes in races due to migration. Note D is a short note on psychological dispositions. Note E attacks the thinking behind shipping tax. Note F is on the mud deposition or alluvium on the east coast of Britain.

The biggest surprise comes after the end of the main text and after the end of the appendix containing this list of long endnotes, the end is still not reached. Instead, a horizontal line occurs, after which the text continues, without a heading or anything explaining what is to be expected. The appendix has an appendix! As a late addition, it could be called an addendum (pp. 381–388). This easily overlooked addendum is of course where Matthew combined the old ideas of natural selection and species transmutation in a hitherto unheard of way. The addendum is followed by a "Retrospective glance at our pages" (pp. 388–390) discussing the book's production, by a colophon (pp. 390–391) mentioning changes in the political scenery of Europe and the implications for the book's main topic of naval timber and rural affairs, and finally by an erratum. Unlike the endnotes, however, these various additions are not referred to anywhere in the main body of the book. The table of contents, however, lists the addendum and the retrospective glace as "Accommodation of organized life to circumstances, by diverging ramifications, ... 381" and "Retrospective glance at our pages, ... 388" respectively. These are not indented but aligned equal to the appendix Notes A to F, in the table of contents, showing that they are not sub-sections of Note F. The thematic break and the double horizontal line between Note F and the addendum at page 381 corroborate this.

There are other elements to the book which are intriguing and mysterious. They require careful analysis, to piece together a likely sequence of events that led to production of the final version. Luckily Matthew is quite informative and open about the events occurring simultaneous to his writing, and that he found them to be of such considerable importance that not only did they distract his attention so he completely forgot about his book sitting with the printers, but they also had consequence for the relevancy of some of his ideas already committed to the page. In response to certain events, Matthew clearly added sections, marked by his introductory statements, such as, "Since writing the above ...", "Since this volume went to press ...", "After the preceding parts of this volume had gone to press ...", etc. This post hoc approach has created a distinctive halting flow and discontinuity between sections.

== Book structure ==
The book is structured in an unorthodox way, as a result of the iterative process in assembling the content, and the reviews reflect this confusion. The gallery shows some of the features discussed later in the following sections on the book's structure. Featured are the two copies of Matthew (1831) held at the National Library of Scotland in Edinburgh. The first is modern 3/4 leather bound, originally from the Adam Black stock (the Edinburgh publisher appears first), and the other in its original publisher's boards, part of the Longman et al., stock (London, first). The books occupy the same Satzspiegel (print space), but trimming has reduced the page spread of the modern bound copy.

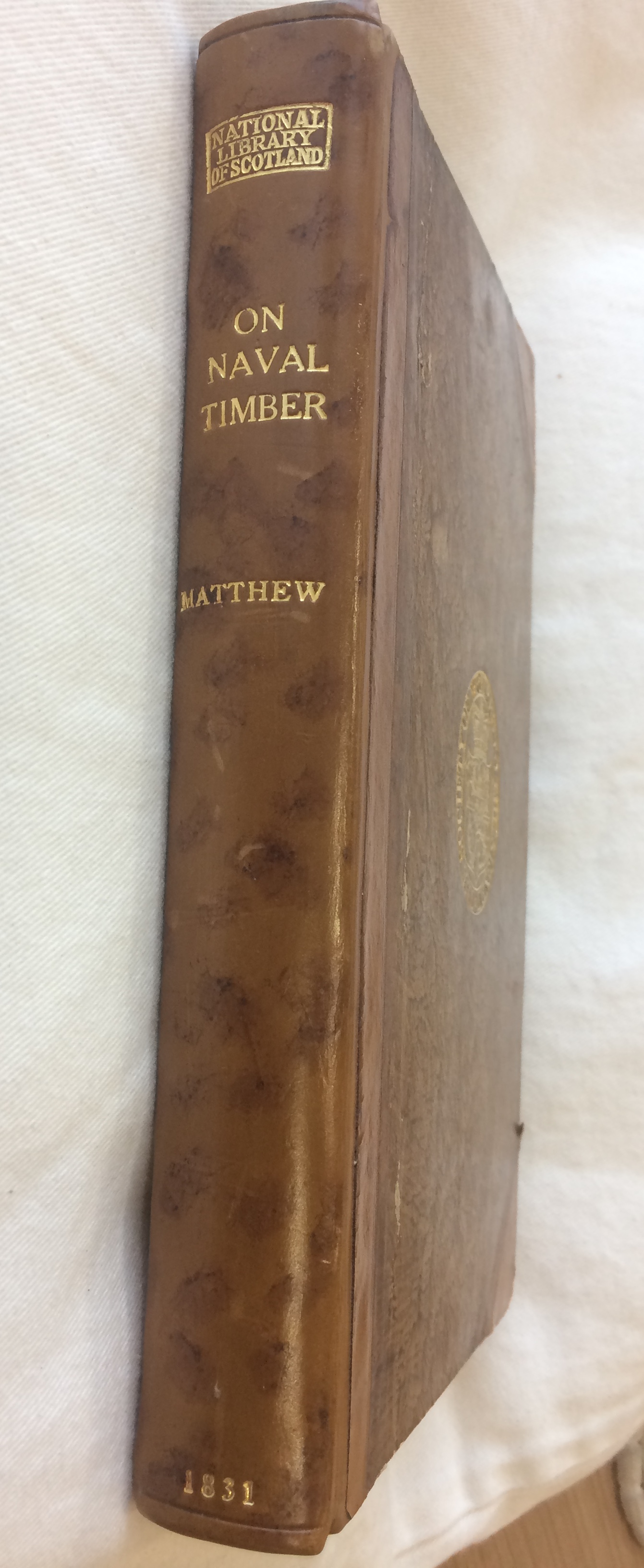
c.1960, 3/4 rebound in leather Showing spine and front marbling, and the library's markings.

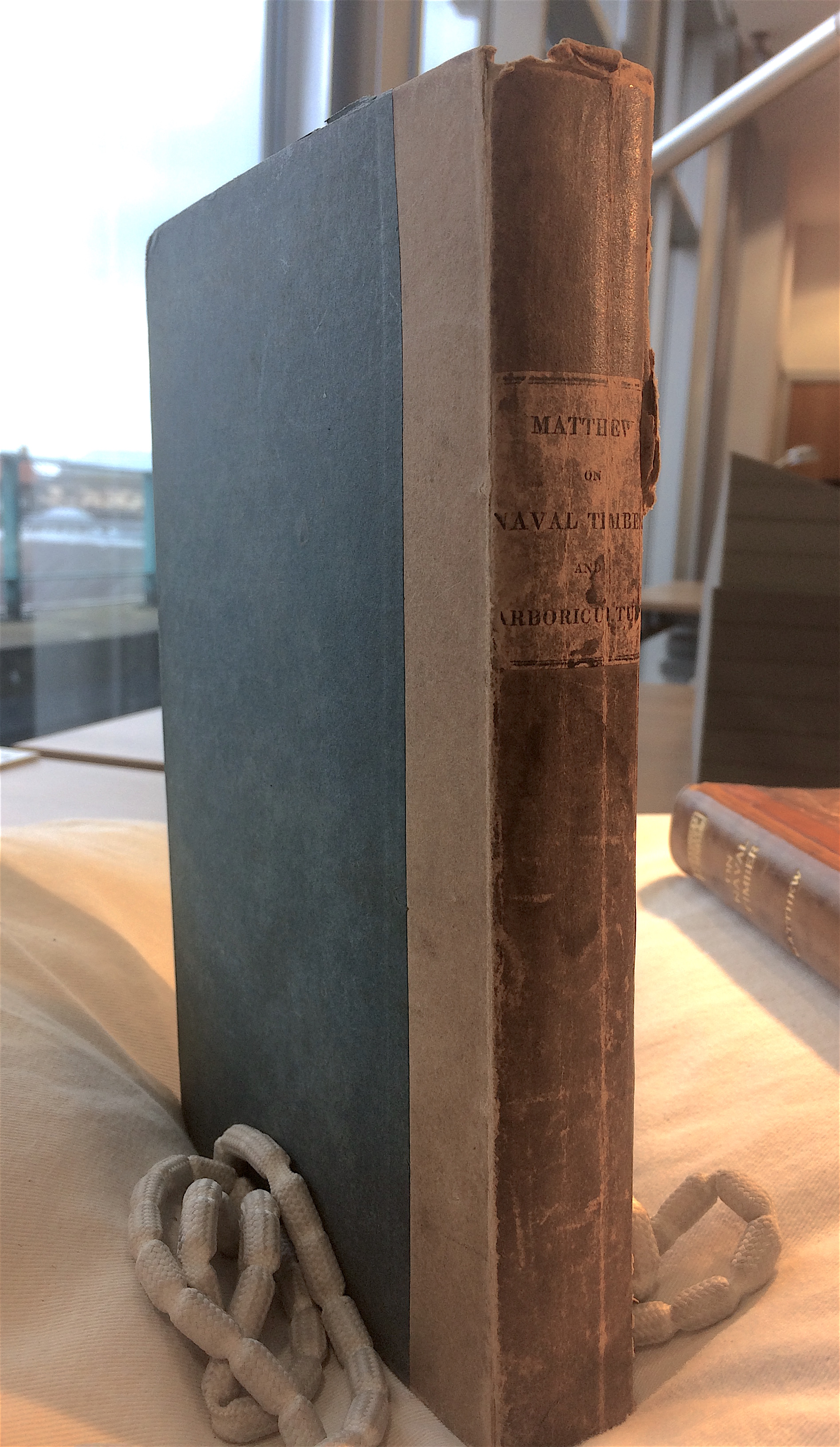
Original publisher's boards, blue paper covered, quartered wood/cardboard, spine off-white paper (blue laid topmost over join), original paper sticker / label.

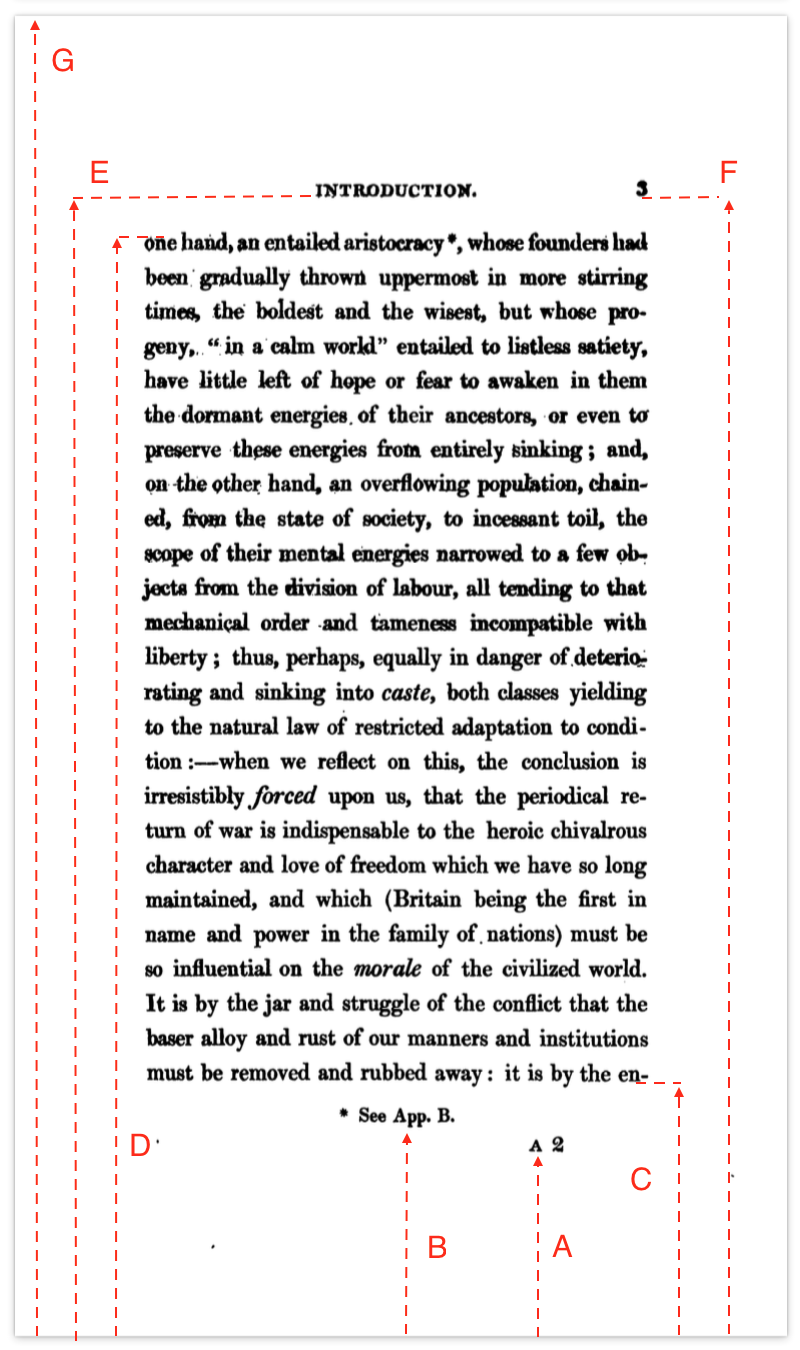
Dimensions layout of a page in Matthew (1831)

Dimensions from bottom page edge, mm	A. distance to footnote printer's mark	B. footer	C. print space lower edge	D. print space top edge	E. page number upper right	F. section title upper middle	G. top page edge
Black's	27	32	39	182	190	190	214
Longman's	32	36	43	187	194	194	223

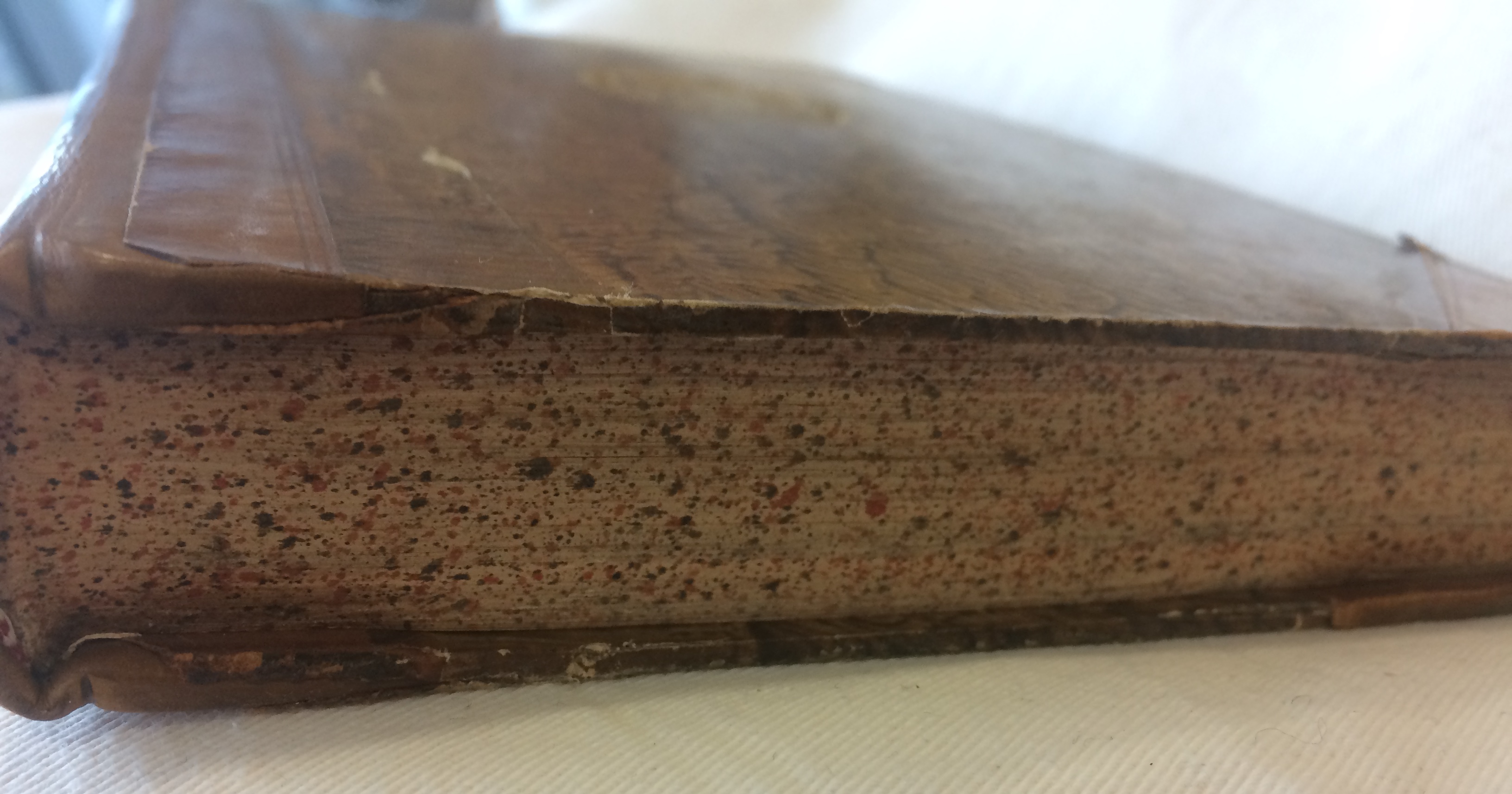
Patterned, trimmed page edge

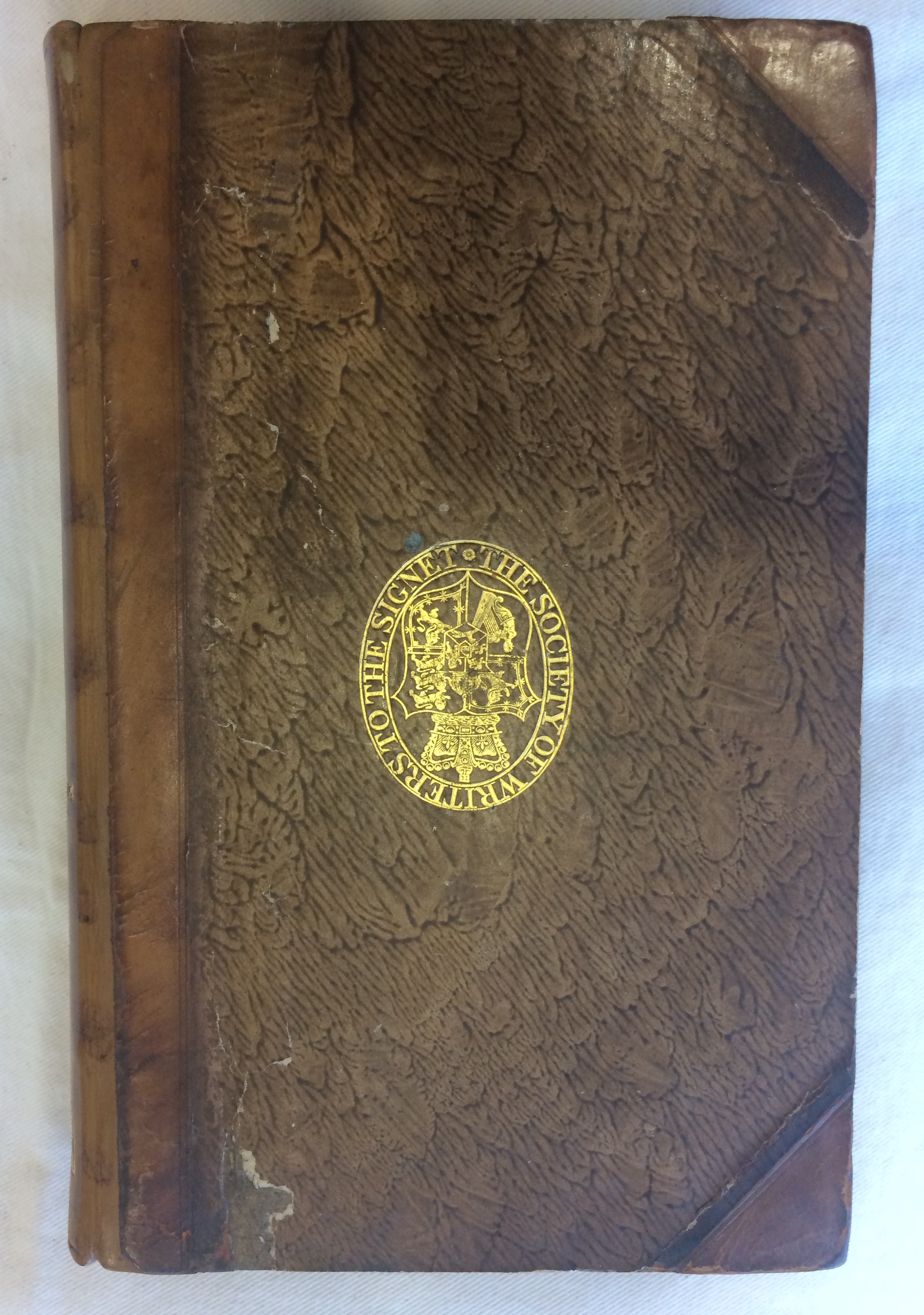
Front with marbling and crest, and corner protection against shelf wear.

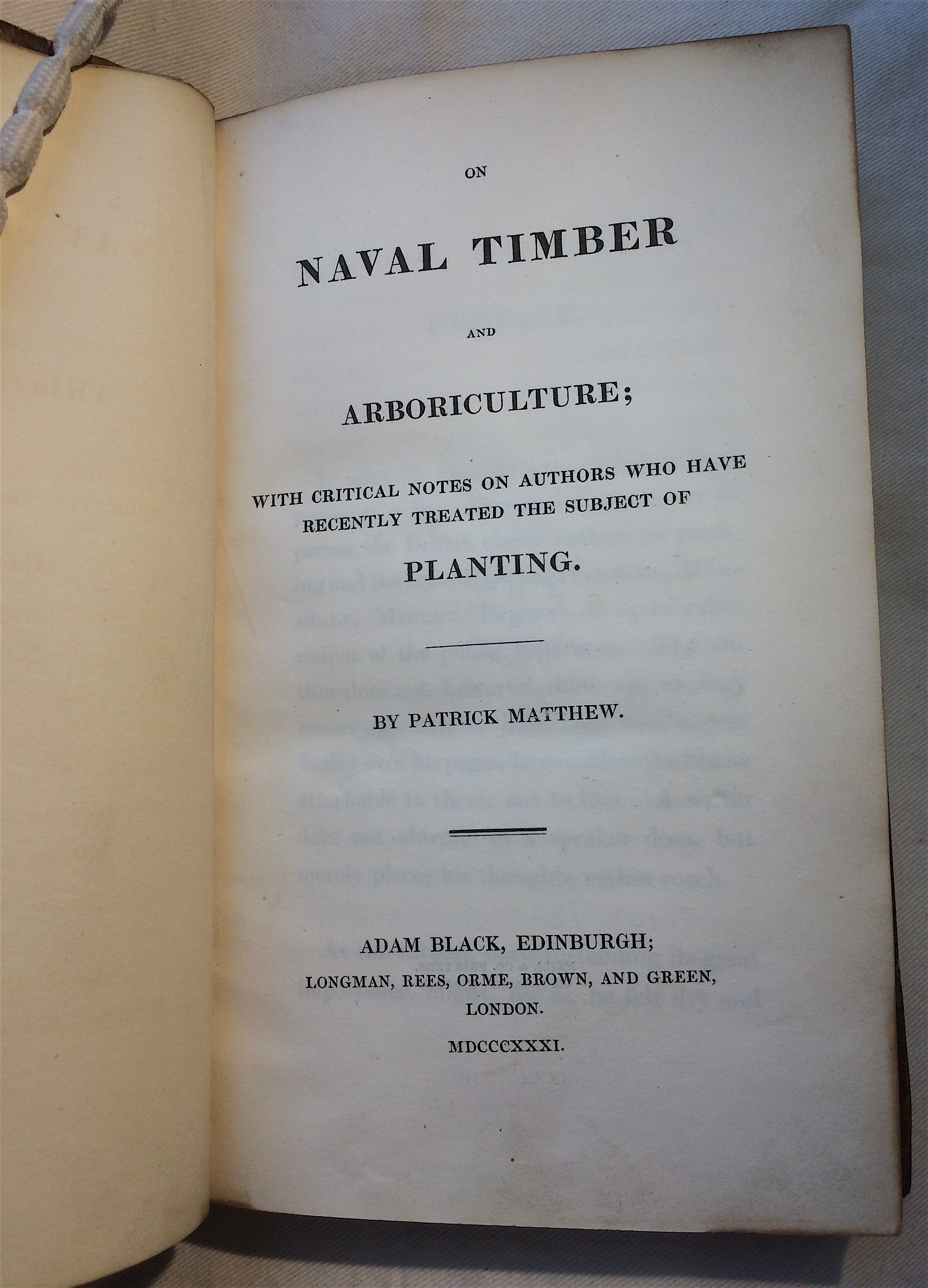
Originally in the Adam Black stock, indicated on folium rectum. No additional "AND". First title page missing.

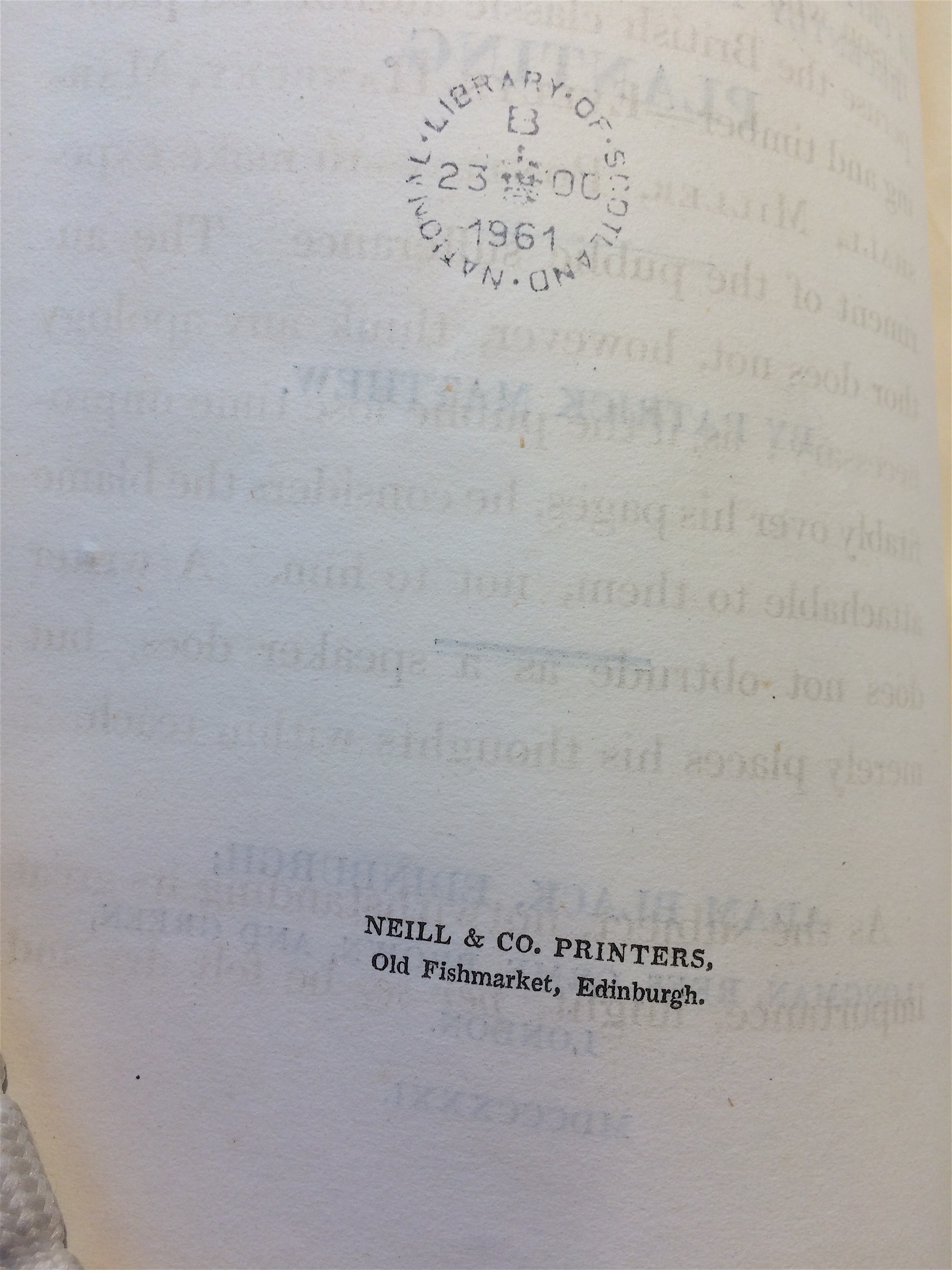
Neill & Co. mark on folium versum

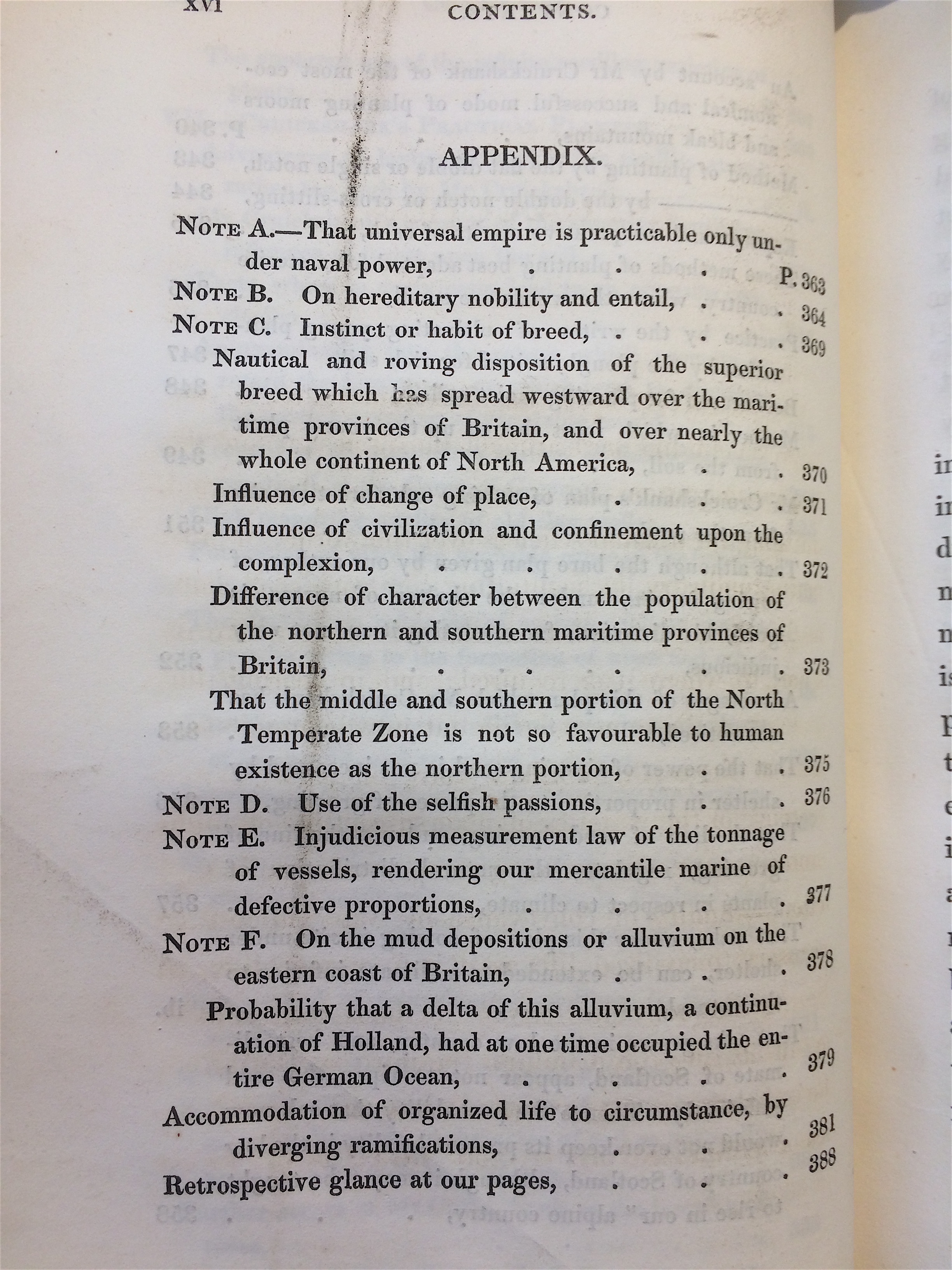
Addendum and "Retrospective glace" entry on Contents page aligned equal to the appendix Notes A to F.

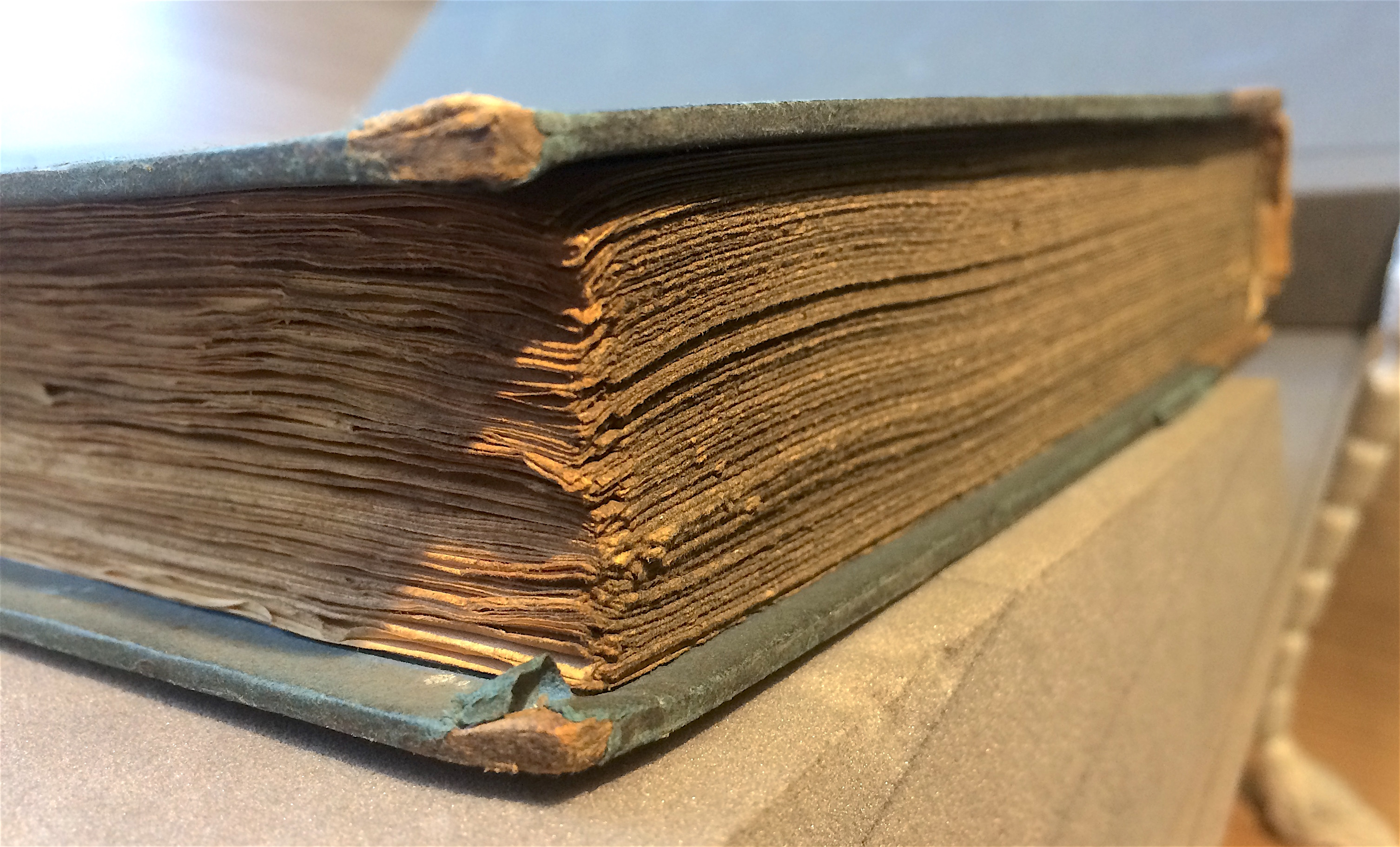
Untrimmed, rough cut edges

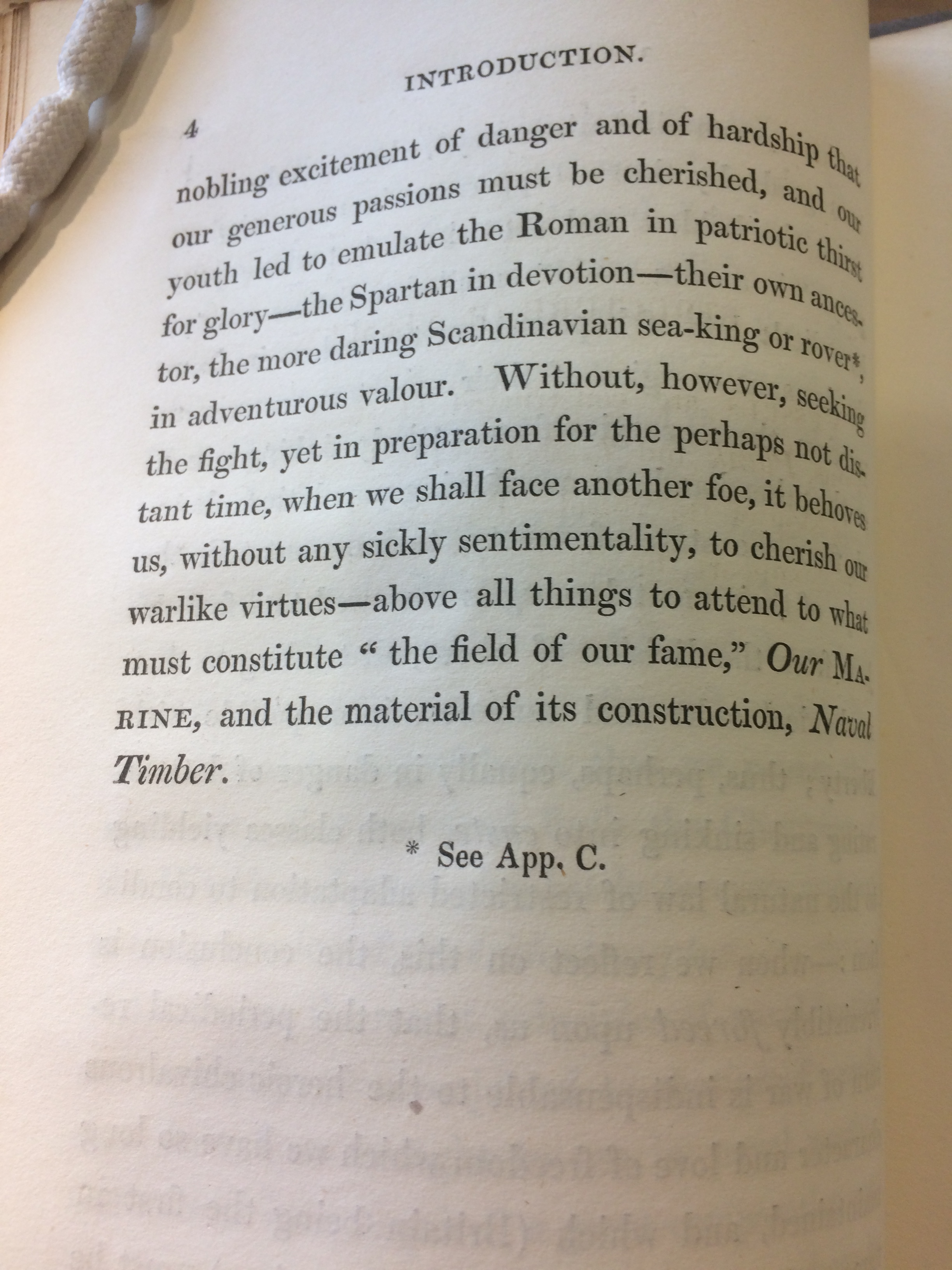
Footnote with direction to appendix

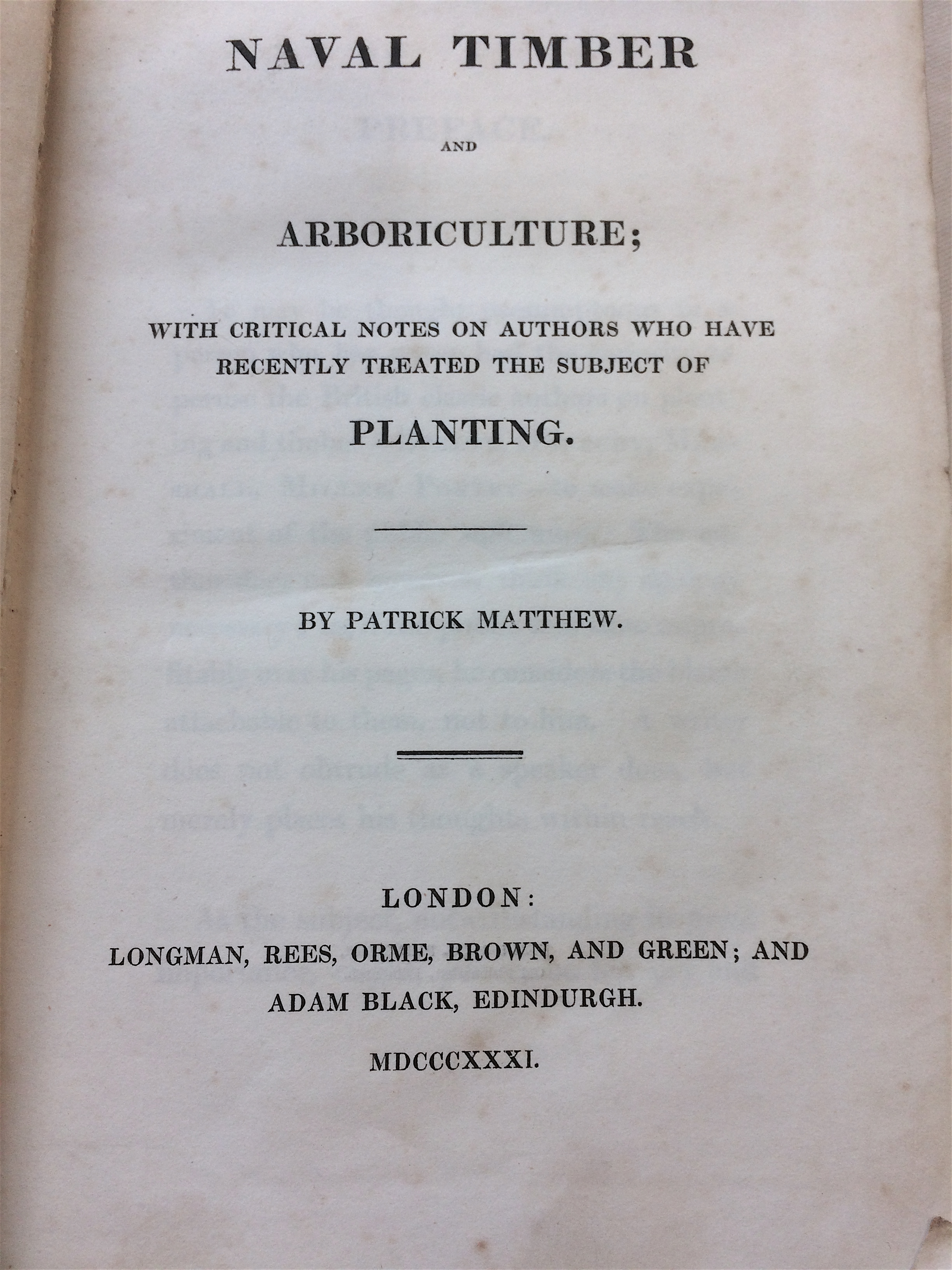
Originally in Longman's stock, indicated on folium rectum. Additional trailing "AND". First title page present (not shown)

== Production ==
In 1831, the publishers Adam Black in Edinburgh and Longman, Rees, Orme, Brown, and Green of London split shares on publishing Matthew's book, On Naval Timber and Arboriculture: With Critical Notes on Authors who Have Recently Treated the Subject of Planting. This was a decision made by the publishers (not by the author as has been asserted), and was common practise as a form of insurance when sales might be poor. The only known number of copies is single print run of 200. These were printed by Neill & Co., in their "old, cramped quarters at Old Fishmarket Close". Of the books that Neill & Co. printed for Adam Black, there is no mention of "On Naval Timber", nor Patrick Matthew, in their in-house history, the surviving inventory, nor the memoirs of Adam Black, including a, "Chronological List of some of the Principal Books published by Adam Black, and A. & C. Black".

== Body text ==
Matthew's book discussed at length how best to grow suitable trees for the construction of the Royal Navy's warships. He considered the task to be of great importance, as the navy permitted the British race to advance. Matthew noted the long-term deleterious effect that culling only the trees of highest timber quality from forests had on the quality of timber.

The topic changed to Concerning our Marine, &c. for pages 130 to 137 of the book. Here Matthew promoted "a system of universal free trade", with the "absolute necessity of abolishing every monopoly and restriction of trade in Britain", particularly the "insane duty on the importation of naval timber and hemp." In Part IV of the book, pages 138 to 359, he wrote critical reviews assessing what other authors had published on tree cultivation.

The appendix was not the only part of the book subsequently augmented by extra material. The "Notices of Authors Who Treat of Arboriculture" also received an additional section (p. 309), "After the preceding parts of this volume had gone to press, we received a copy of Cruickshank's Practical Planter. We endeavour to give a short view of the contents". That short review added fifty pages, second only to the previous section in criticism of Sit Henry Steuart which required eighty pages.

== Appendix ==
In an Appendix, pages 363 to 391 of the book, Matthew discussed assorted topics: Note A was about the nautical basis of the British Empire: "It is only on the "Ocean" that "Universal Empire" is practicable – only by means of "Navigation" that all of the world can be subdued or retained under one dominion".

In Note B. On hereditary nobility and entail, he objected to feudal privilege perpetuated by entail under Scots law. Like other Radicals of the time and educational background, he drew on a concept of self-transforming ascent from below in transmutation of species to justify his political opposition to aristocratic control of society:

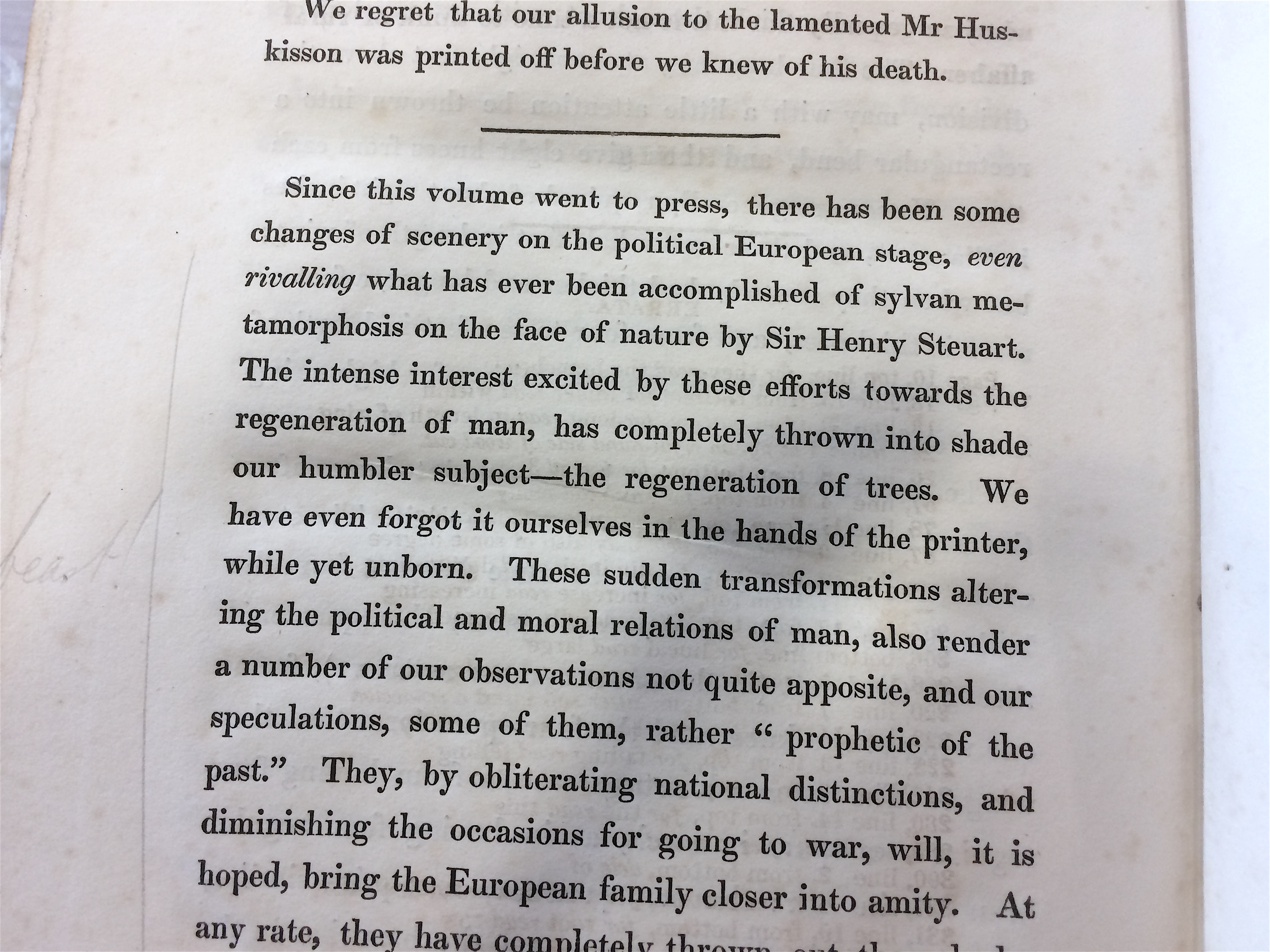
Final colophon section on p.390 explaining circumstances of July Revolution, with a gibe at a competitor. An unappreciative reader has annotated the passage in pencil, "beast!"

Matthew explains in his colophon relating to the circumstances for producing the book as published; the July Revolution of 1830 punctuated the period between the print run and the book's release at the end of the year ("Dating books published in December with the following year's date was actually very common in the nineteenth century. It made them seem 'new' for longer."). The uprising in France affected him to the point of even forgetting he had a book in press!

Since this volume went to press, there has been some changes of scenery on the political European stage, even rivalling what has ever been accomplished of sylvan metamorphosis on the face of nature by Sir Henry Steuart. The intense interest excited by these efforts towards the regeneration of man, has completely thrown into shade our humbler subject—the regeneration of trees. We have even forgot it

ourselves in the hands of the printer, while yet unborn […] We had intended to bring out Naval Timber and Arboriculture as a portion of a work embracing Rural Economy in general, but this is not a time to think of rural affairs.

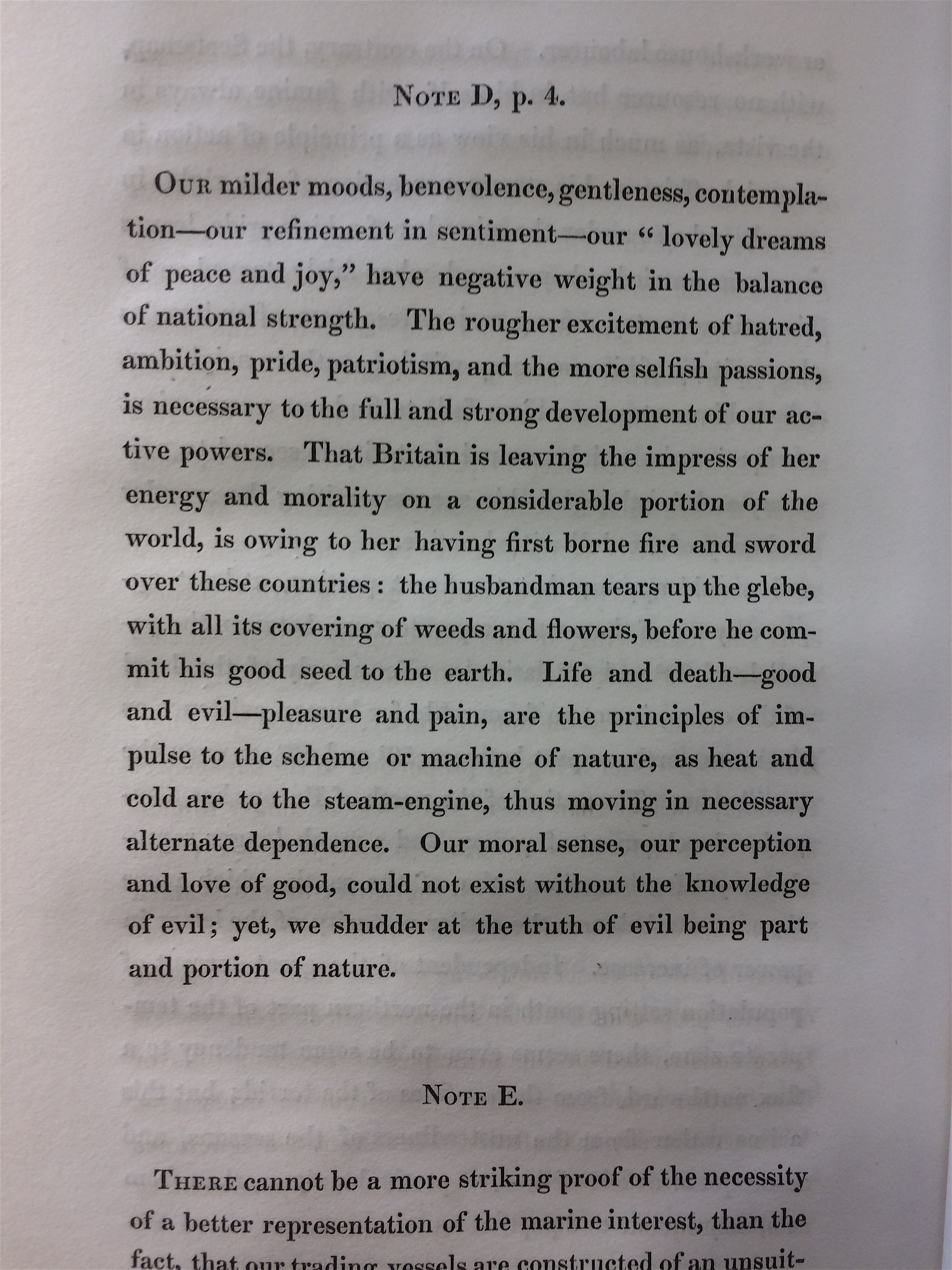
Appendices, including Note D reference to applicable page where direction was omitted

Given the lack of integration of the subjects covered: arboriculture, empire, entail and, evolution, with most commonality between the latter pair, it strongly suggests that the manuscript submitted for printing solely comprised the main body text of Matthew's management rules, and his criticism of other planters. The references to appendices are printed in the footer area of the pages 2, 3, 4 and 135 (the only place where they are called appendices, abbreviated "App.") and in the footer of page 293 (not abbreviated: "* See Appendix F."), plus an additional reference to Note B from within the body text on page 374. Note D is omitted from direct mention, save the Contents page. The title to Note D on page 376 reads, Note D, p. 4., as if accommodating the oversight in the second instalment was easier and less costly than reprinting, or adding to page 4, even at the proofing stage. The addendum is not mentioned throughout the body text, but is appended to the list of appendices on the eighth Contents page. The Contents page for the appendices is entirely separate from the rest of the book's Contents listing, which is otherwise neatly balanced and spaced to occupy its seven pages span.

This further suggests that the appendices were added to the first two sections, along with the three footers in a different typeface, and the additional Contents page, as a subsequent stage in the book's construction. This followed Matthew's examination of his galley proof, sent out as standard practise for Edinburgh letterpress printers in 1830 (confirmed by Robert Smail's Printing Works). He would have followed the Guide to Authors in Correcting the Press, an example of which is provided in the later Neill & Co.'s specimen catalog, and also add in thoughts that he held about Malthusian pressures on life and the exacerbation of survival from competition, inspired by current events in France, that had seen the rejection of the hereditary monarchy and royal succession, in preference for an elective monarchy,

There is a law universal in nature, tending to render every reproductive being the best possibly suited to its condition that its kind, or that organized matter, is susceptible of, which appears intended to model the physical and mental or instinctive powers, to their highest perfection, and to continue them so. [p.364]
[...]
The law of entail, necessary to hereditary nobility, is an outrage on this law of nature which she will not pass unavenged—a law which has the most debasing influence upon the energies of a people, and will sooner or later lead to general subversion, more especially when the executive of a country remains for a considerable time efficient, and no effort is needed on the part of the nobility to protect their own, or no war to draw forth or preserve their powers by exertion. It is all very well, when, in stormy times, the baron has every faculty trained to its utmost ability in keeping his proud crest aloft. How far hereditary nobility, under effective government, has operated to retard "the march of intellect," and deteriorate the species in modern Europe, is an interesting and important question. We have seen it play its part in France; we see exhibition of its influence throughout the Iberian peninsula, to the utmost degradation of its victims. It has rendered the Italian peninsula, with its islands, a blank in the political map of Europe. Let the panegyrists of hereditary nobility, primogeniture, and entail, say what these countries might not have been but for the baneful influence of this unnatural custom. [p.365-6]
[...]
The self-regulating adaptive disposition of organized life may, in part, be traced to the extreme fecundity of Nature, who, as before stated, has, in all the varieties of her offspring, a prolific power much beyond (in many cases a thousandfold) what is necessary to fill up the vacancies caused by senile decay. As the field of existence is limited and pre-occupied, it is only the hardier, more robust, better suited to circumstance individuals, who are able to struggle forward to maturity, these inhabiting only the situations to which they have superior adaptation and greater power of occupancy than any other kind; the weaker, less circumstance-suited, being prematurely destroyed. (p.384-5)

Unfortunately, there are no watermarks on the paper used, it being the few years between the end of "wove" paper and the introduction of modern paper making technology. A chemical analysis would be possible, as also electron-microscopy, to ascertain any difference between the paper within each section, which would help clarify whether the book comprises sections printed on successive dates, or in a single run following all changes made at proofing. It is unlikely this would also detect if different areas within the layout for the same page had been printed on different days, which was an option for printers at the time.

== Construction ==
The all-important addendum contains those sections that had to have been added after the main sections were printed, otherwise they could not possibly be referring to material already printed, although he might be inspecting galley proofs, yet was unable to make changes to the main body of text.

=== First instalment ===
The parts of the book that do not refer to those later sections, with their final section designation and page numbers, are,

PART I.	Structure of Vessels	5
PART II.	British Forest Trees Suited for Naval Purposes	31
PART III.	Miscellaneous Matter Connected With Naval Timber	106
PART IV.	Notices of Authors Who Treat of Arboriculture	138
NOTE A.	That universal empire is practicable only under naval power	363
NOTE E.	Injudicious measurement law of the tonnage of vessels, rendering our mercantile marine of defective proportions	377
NOTE F.	On the mud depositions or alluvium on the eastern coast of Britain	378

This then would comprise the originally intended book, and the printed manuscript, pre-July 1830, a book on timber and marine, with a critique of competitors. Matthew then submitted his manuscript, then forgot all about it, distracted by the political and civil unrest on the continent, as he explains in his later addition, specifically the final paragraph of colophon, on the last page of the book.

=== Second instalment ===
It is reasonable to suggest that material that mentions issues relating to those developments in France were added subsequent to the submission (all mentions of France are in the appendices; entail is mentioned twice in quick succession in the introduction). In support, Note B is referenced from Note C (p. 374). This would then constitute a 2nd draft, after the July Revolution, likely adding the following in its final form, as these sections are unaffected by later additions,

PREFACE
INTRODUCTION	further developed to tie in entail
PART IV.	Notices of Authors Who Treat of Arboriculture: VII.—Cruickshank's Practical Planter	309
NOTE B	On hereditary nobility and entail	364
NOTE C	Instinct or habit of breed	369
NOTE D	Use of the selfish passions	376

This then produced in total a book on timber and marine, critique of competitors and a scathing attack on entail.

It is possible that the second instalment included the part described below for a mooted third instalment. There is no significance of there being just one, or two later instalments. While what is nominally called the third instalment here appears to have been added to the book after the second, it is possible that they may have been submitted simultaneously. Another potential is that just the final section of the main part of the book, the fifty-page review of Cruickshank's Practical Planter, was submitted alone, then the final instalment contained everything remaining, which would have significantly expanded the evolutionary component.

=== Possible third instalment ===
There are several phenomena that are confusing when considering the sequence of events in constructing this book. There is the mystery of a spacing bar positioned after a line break at the end of NOTE F, then another line spacing, before the beginning of an addendum (essentially the appendix to the appendix, although all the signs suggest it being added later). It is even reasonable to consider the addendum as being added as an afterthought, following the second version of Matthew's manuscript. This is suggested by the colophon in that third instalment which mentions the material that was included to date. Additionally, the new material is not integral to the appendix that precedes it, nor does it merge with the appendix where it appears in the Contents. All this points towards the vital exposition of positive natural selection being added along with the errata, as an afterthought, and almost not making it into the book!

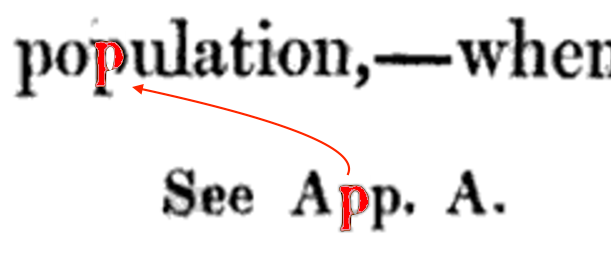
Comparison of type size used in body text and footnote on p.2 of Matthew (1831)

Two sections are listed on the eighth page of Contents along with the appendices (referred to as Notes), the addendum ("Retrospective glance at our pages ...") and colophon (first part starts, "In taking a retrospective glance at our pages from the press ...", and second part starts, "Since this volume went to press ..."). Both are left aligned to correspond with the each appendix entry, but only the addendum is separated from the preceding text (Note F) by a sizeable line break. It is also marked by a spacer bar. The first and second parts of the colophon have double line breaks to separate them from the preceding section, while the second part of the colophon also has a spacer bar.

The finishing touches must have included the eighth Contents page with the list of appendices, and at the same time, or even later, the entry for the addendum and the "Retrospective glance," both aligned equal to the appendix notes. Also added after the first instalment, the footer references to appendices A, B, C and E, on pages 2, 3, 4 and 135, respectively, as inferred by Matthew's colophon comments.

It is notable that the footers are set in a different typeface to the main body text. The former is possibly Small Pica No.1, identified from the printer's catalogue, while the footers are in a reduced serif form, and at a slightly smaller size. There is kerning for the uppercase letters, in neither the body nor footer types. The title page is set in a mixture of title types that Neill & Co. offered:

TWO-LINE RUBYON
TWO-LINE LONGPRIMERNAVAL TIMBER
TWO-LINE DIAMONDAND
TWO-LINE BREVIERARBORICULTURE;
etc.

=== Argument for preconception ===
The alignment of the addendum entry equal to the appendix notes on the Contents page, and the sense of post-production arising from Matthew's "Since this volume went to press" comment in the colophon, could be explained in two ways: that printing directions were lost or misunderstood between Black and Neill, or Matthew sent the new material directly to Neill with no printing directions. There doesn't seem another reasonable explanation for the addendum entry appearing as it does on the Contents page. One suggestion is that the book structure as is, was intended all along, because Matthew had wished to subtly pass its heretical content into society, secreted into an inconspicuous, and easily excisable portion of the book,

… a dangerously condensed heretical summary of his conclusions, in an appendix. If the book was to be banned for heresy or sedition, its publisher, bookseller or owner could at least remove the appendix in order to save the rest from the bonfire.

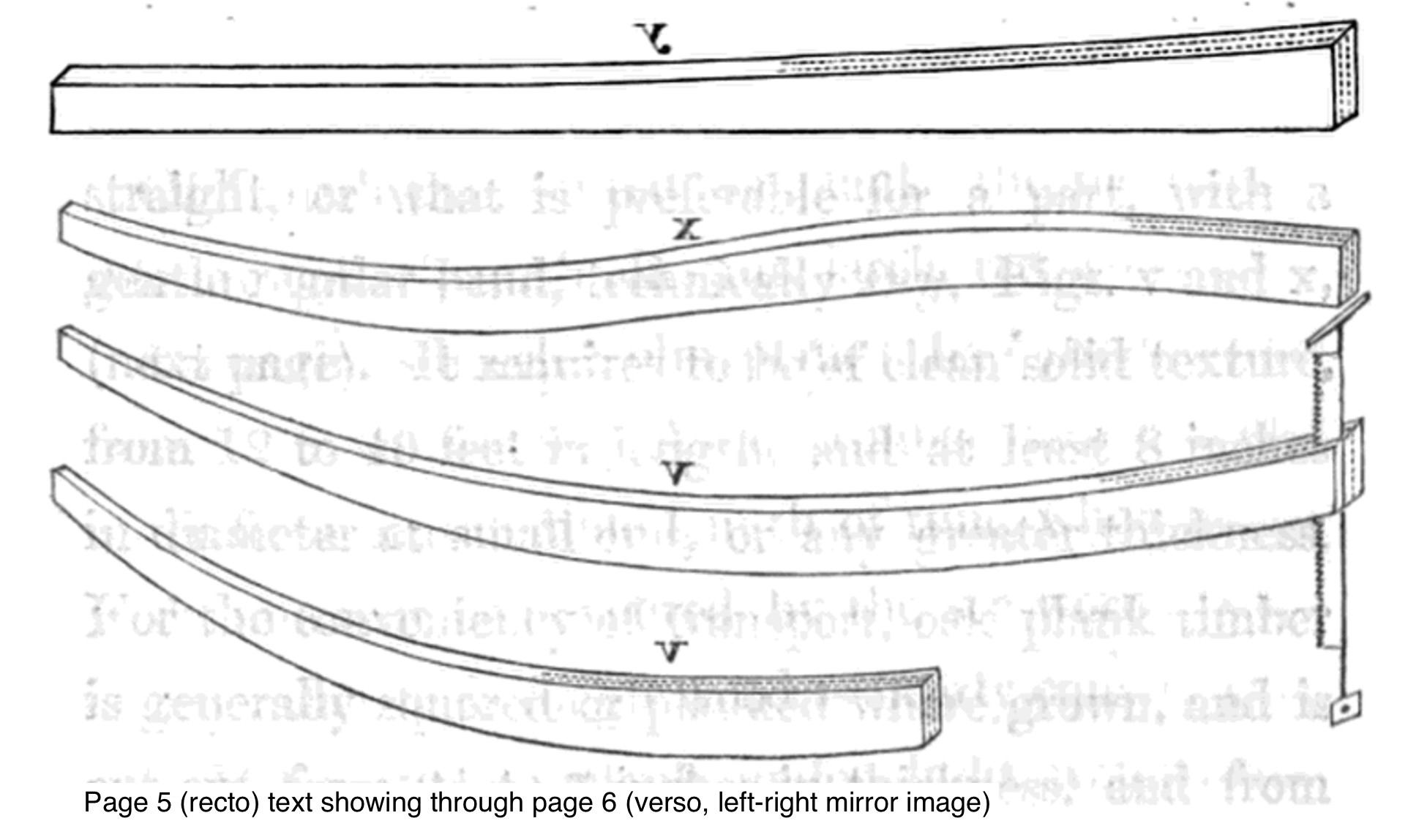
Page 5 (recto) text showing through page 6 (verso, left-right mirror image) in scanned copy of Matthew (1831) c/o Bodleian Library, U. Oxford.

However, this proposal, for a preconceived structure, also needs to explain why Matthew would think it necessary to hide ideas on theistic evolution, when prominent challenges to natural theology already stretched back over half a century, to Hume and Maupertuis, and were current at his alma mater, the University of Edinburgh, because of Robert Edmond Grant, Robert Jameson, Henry Hulme Cheek and the Plinians. Other anomalies as noted previously, that also require harmonisation with this proposal of preconception, include, the Contents page alignment, Matthew's post production references to printed content, and the disjointed, erratic flow of material, that deals with at least four main topics: arboriculture, empire, entail, and evolution.

More realistically, perhaps contradicting the multiple dates idea is that there are no breaks between the bound paper blocks that match the different sections. Each page is one part of eight, of a larger sheet folded. When bound, the pages originating from the same sheet can appear in quite different parts of a book, but always within the same block. The enigma here is that sections that seem like afterthoughts and added at later stages, do not appear as separate page bundles that were printed independent of earlier sections. If that is the case, and Matthew had devised his book as it is, from the outset, it is hard to see how he went to press before the July Revolution, as he states, with a book originally intended to be only on arboriculture, but then end up with a book quite different, if it had not been added to in the interim. Furthermore, the first part of the colophon ("In taking a retrospective glance at our pages ...". p. 388) refers to the book as already printed, and the few mistakes he could have improved, plus, there is an erratum on the final page.

A final oddity can be observed in what appear to be "wet ink marks" visible in the scanned PDF copy of the book held at the University of Oxford's Bodleian Library. This might prove confusing to anyone unfamiliar with Victorian letterpress printing. However, it is questionable whether these are wet ink marks as, not only would the same side of the same block of eight pages be printed for the entire print run of 200 copies, according to imposition, but the same marks do not show up in other copies of the book, for example, the one at Harvard University, or the two copies at the National Library of Scotland in Edinburgh. Ultimately, taking the mirror image of the page, in order to make the marks more legible, the type can be seen to match the text on the other side of each page. The marks are therefore an artefact of the scanning process, and not inherent to the book.

=== Final instalment ===
Ergo, the indications are that Matthew constructed the book iteratively, producing this third instalment, that includes the evolutionary exposition (p. 381), plus a further colophon ("In taking a retrospective glance at our pages ..." p. 388) that provides a better description of the technique to produce "knees" from split stems and roots. He also mentions his oversight of omitting instructions for bending planks, but then informs the reader that nature mostly takes care of that anyway (p. 390). The final sentence in that section is another one of those potential sources for confusion, as it states, "We regret that our allusion to the lamented Mr Huskisson was printed off before we knew of his death". This comment supports the retrospection in other sections that further implies later additions to the book. Seeking out Huskisson's earlier mention, he appears in passing within the section Concerning Our Marine (in Part III: Miscellaneous Matter Connected With Naval Timber, p. 130), "Can it be believed that our very liberal late minister (Mr Huskisson), and our very non-liberal member for Newark (Mr Sadler), have both made a full exposè [sic] of the distresses of our shipping interest ..." (p. 136). To avoid misunderstanding, "late" is used here not in reference to no longer being alive, but rather to no longer having his role in government: he resigned in this case. It was in particularly frequent use during 1830 in the context of the aftermath of the July Revolution in France; for example, an editorial in the Perthshire Courier of 2 September 1830 remarked "To appease the popular fury, it is almost certain that the lives of some of the late Ministers are to be sacrificed". The very last section of colophon follows a bar and line break ("Since this volume went to press").

Placing this instalment in sequence is troublesome. The comments Matthew makes suggest it was written later than the first version of the book, and after receiving proofs, or even after the print run was completed. But it is not obvious whether it comprised an instalment of its own, subsequent to the second instalment, or whether that new material and this, was collected to comprise one submission. Either way, the net new material in this final instalment was as follows,

CONTENTS	added to include addendum
ADDENDUM	Accommodation of organised life to circumstance by diverging ramifications	381
COLOPHON part 1	"Retrospective glance at our pages ..."	388
COLOPHON part 2	"Since this volume went to press ..."	390
ERRATUM	errata	391

The final manuscript comprised, a book on timber and marine, including a critique of Matthew's competitors in arboriculture, his scathing attack on entail, and significantly in retrospect, the expanded account of a natural law he called a natural process of selection, added as afterthought, but central to his argument against degeneration of nobility through entail, and its culmination into the recent rebellion on the Continent.

== Significance of the addendum ==
The addendum therefore comprises the colophon and erratum, and before them, the all-important exposition of Matthew's evolutionary concept, his "natural process of selection",

THERE is a law universal in nature, tending to render every reproductive being the best possibly suited to its condition that its kind, or that organized matter, is susceptible of, which appears intended to model the physical and mental or instinctive powers, to their highest perfection, and to continue them so. This law sustains the lion in his strength, the hare in her swiftness, and the fox in his wiles. As Nature, in all her modifications of life, has a power of increase far beyond what is needed to supply the place of what falls by Time's decay, those individuals who possess not the requisite strength, swiftness, hardihood, or cunning, fall prematurely without reproducing—either a prey to their natural devourers, or sinking under disease, generally induced by want of nourishment, their place being occupied by the more perfect of their own kind, who are pressing on the means of subsistence. The law of entail, necessary to hereditary nobility, is an outrage on this law of nature which she will not pass unavenged ...

In the appendix he elaborated on comments in the main text on how artificial selection—the elimination of trees of poor timber quality from the breeding stock—could be used to improve timber quality, and even create new varieties of trees. He extrapolated from this to what is today recognised as a description of natural selection. Although his book was reviewed in several periodical publications of the time, the significance of Matthew's insight was apparently lost upon his readers, as it languished in obscurity for nearly three decades. The only library in Perth at the time banned the book. Despite the suggestion that this through the librarian, "having no doubt spotted its hidden heresy", considering the historical context, it is more likely that the heretical content would be seen as the attacks on Sir Walter Scott, Paley's teleological immutability by Special Creation, and his other gripe, nobility and entail. Of Paley's Theological Naturalism, alternatives from Buffon transformatism and Lamarck unguided evolution still assumed a divine Creator. There is nothing to say Matthew was any different, such as evidence of him being an atheist (quite the opposite in fact). Also, Matthew's dealings in Perthshire, his personal and political opinions made public, were sometimes not well received.

== Reviews ==
On Naval Timber was reviewed in at least 6 periodicals between 1831 and 1833. A further review appeared in the Gardener's Chronicle in 1860, after it had published the correspondence of Matthew and Darwin between 7 April and 12 May 1860,

- Anon. "Matthew on Naval Timber and Arboriculture". Evans and Ruffy's Farmers' Journal and Agricultural Advertizer, Vol 24 (1831), No. 1218 (Mon 17 January), p. 3
- Anon. Literary Criticism. Edinburgh Literary Journal, or Weekly Register of Criticism and Belles Lettres, Vol 6 (Jul-Dec, 1831), No. 138 (Sat 2 July), pp. 1–4
  - Matthew received a scathing review: "This is a publication of as great promise, and as paltry performance, as ever came under our critical inspection. From its title, On Naval Timber and Arboriculture, it will probably attract readers; but the intelligent among them will suffer considerable disappointment in the perusal, as we must say that there are not ten pages of really new matter in the volume, on those interesting subject"
- Anon. "On Naval Timber". United Service Journal (1831, Part 2), No. 33 Aug, pp. 457–466; Anon. "On Naval Timber" (continued). United Service Journal (1831, Part 3), No. 34 Sept, pp. 65–76
  - An extended review in the 1831 Part II and 1831 Part III numbers of the magazine; it praised Matthew's book in around 13,000 words, highlighting that, "The British Navy has such urgent claims on the vigilance of every person as the bulwark of his independence and happiness, that any effort for supporting and improving its strength, lustre, and dignity, must meet with unqualified attention." It approved of Mathew "strictly in his capacity as a forest-ranger, where he is original, bold and evidently experienced in all the arcana of the parentage, birth and education of trees. But, we disclaim participation in his ruminations on the law of Nature, or on the outrages committed upon reason and justice by our burthens of hereditary nobility, entailed property, and insane enactments." The review did not mention the appendix to the book.
- Anon. "On Naval Timber and Arboriculture". Metropolitan Magazine, Vol 2 (1831), No. 5 Sept, p. 44
- Anon (attributed to J. C. Loudon). Matthew, Patrick: "On Naval Timber and Arboriculture". Gardener's Magazine and Register of Rural & Domestic Improvements, Vol 8 (1832), pp. 702–3
  - This review noted Matthew's argument, "that the best interests of Britain consist in the extension of her dominion on the ocean; and that, as a means to this end, naval architecture is a subject of primary importance; and, by consequence, the culture and production of naval timber is also very important. He explains, by description and by figures, the forms and qualities of planks and timbers most in request in the construction of ships; and then describes those means of cultivating trees, which he considers most effectively conducive to the production of these required planks and timbers." The review noted that Matthew listed suitable forest trees, described the relative merits of each, and also devoted 222 pages to critical reviews of other publications about timber. It said that "An appendix of 29 pages concludes the book, and receives some parenthetical evolutions of various extraneous points which the author struck upon in prosecuting the thesis of his book. This may be truly termed, in a double sense, an extraordinary part of the book. One of the subjects discussed in the appendix is the puzzling one of the origin of species and varieties; and if the author has herein originated no original views (and of this we are far from certain), he has certainly exhibited his own in an original manner."
- Anon. "Article VI: Dry Rot – Mr. Kyan's Patent". Quarterly Review, Vol 49 (1833), pp. 125–135
  - Out of the ten-page review for three titles, Matthew's is over in the first half-page, focussed on the book's coverage of timber decay and the failure of the Navy Board to do "something efficacious" about rot, and his proposal "that a 'rot-prevention-officer wood physician' should be appointed to each vessel of war", for which Matthew received a cordial yet dismissive dealing by the reviewer, for evidently not knowing his dry rot. Otherwise, it said the book was "on the whole, not a bad one".
- Anon (likely James Brown). "Notices to Correspondents: Books". Gardeners' Chronicle and Agricultural Gazette (30 June 1860), p. 604
  - Following the correspondence between Matthew and Darwin, another reader writes to ask for the title of the earlier publication. In the section "Notices to Correspondents", an editor responds with short but a favourable review firstly disclaiming that, "It is so little known that we were not aware of its existence until quite lately.", then proceeding to mention that, "it is full of practical information, along with which are speculations on 'What a British Gentleman should be; The apparent use of the infinite seedling varieties of plants; On Hereditary Nobility and Entail; Use of the Selfish Passions.' &c. This may account for a really valuable book having been passed by with little notice. It contains plenty of sound knowledge and common-sense criticism of writers on planting. His condemnation of the experiments by Barlow and others on the strength of timber are well worth perusal".

=== Reviews remaining undocumented ===
- Country Times 1830
- Perthshire Courier Thursday 16 December 1830 (Words: 1874 | Page: 3)
- According to Matthew, there was also a review in The Metropolitan Magazine.

== Works cited ==
- Desmond, Adrian J. (1989), The Politics of Evolution: Morphology, Medicine, and Reform in Radical London, University of Chicago Press, ISBN 978-0-226-14374-3
- Norman, Andrew (2013). Charles Darwin: Destroyer of Myths. Barnsley, South Yorkshire: Pen & Sword Discovery. ISBN 978-1-78159-278-6.
