= Scottish education in the eighteenth century =

Overview of the Scottish education during the eighteenth century

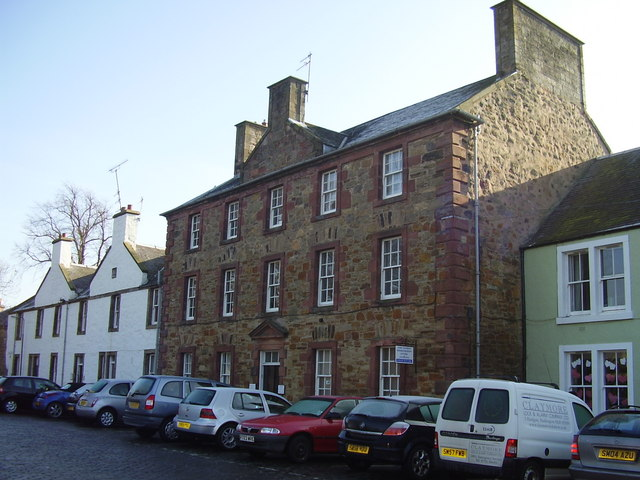
The New Grammar School in Haddington, opened in 1755

Scottish education in the eighteenth century concerns all forms of education, including schools, universities and informal instruction, in Scotland in the eighteenth century.

At the beginning of the period there was a largely complete network of parish schools in the Lowlands, although there were gaps in provision in the Highlands. Wealth from the Agricultural Revolution led to a programme of extensive rebuilding of schools. From the 1790s urban schools were often rebuild in a more imposing classical style. Many poorer girls were taught in dame schools, informally set up by a widow or spinster to teach reading, sewing and cooking. Literacy rates were lower in the Highlands than in comparable Lowland rural society, and despite these efforts illiteracy remained prevalent into the nineteenth century. Increasing numbers of girls from the higher social orders were taught in boarding schools. Female illiteracy rates remained high, but there were highly educated women who emerged as authors in this period.

Scottish universities went from being small and parochial institutions, largely for the training of clergy and lawyers, to major intellectual centres at the forefront of Scottish identity and life, seen as fundamental to democratic principles and the opportunity for social advancement for the talented. Chairs of medicine were founded at all the university towns. By the 1740s Edinburgh medical school was the major centre of medicine in Europe and was a leading centre in the Atlantic world. Access to Scottish universities was probably more open than in contemporary England, Germany or France. Attendance was less expensive and the student body more representative of society as a whole. The system was flexible and the curriculum became a modern philosophical and scientific one, in keeping with contemporary needs for improvement and progress. Scotland reaped the intellectual benefits of this system in its contribution to the European Enlightenment. Many of the key figures of the Scottish Enlightenment were university professors, who developed their ideas in university lectures.

== Schools ==
=== Background: early modern era ===
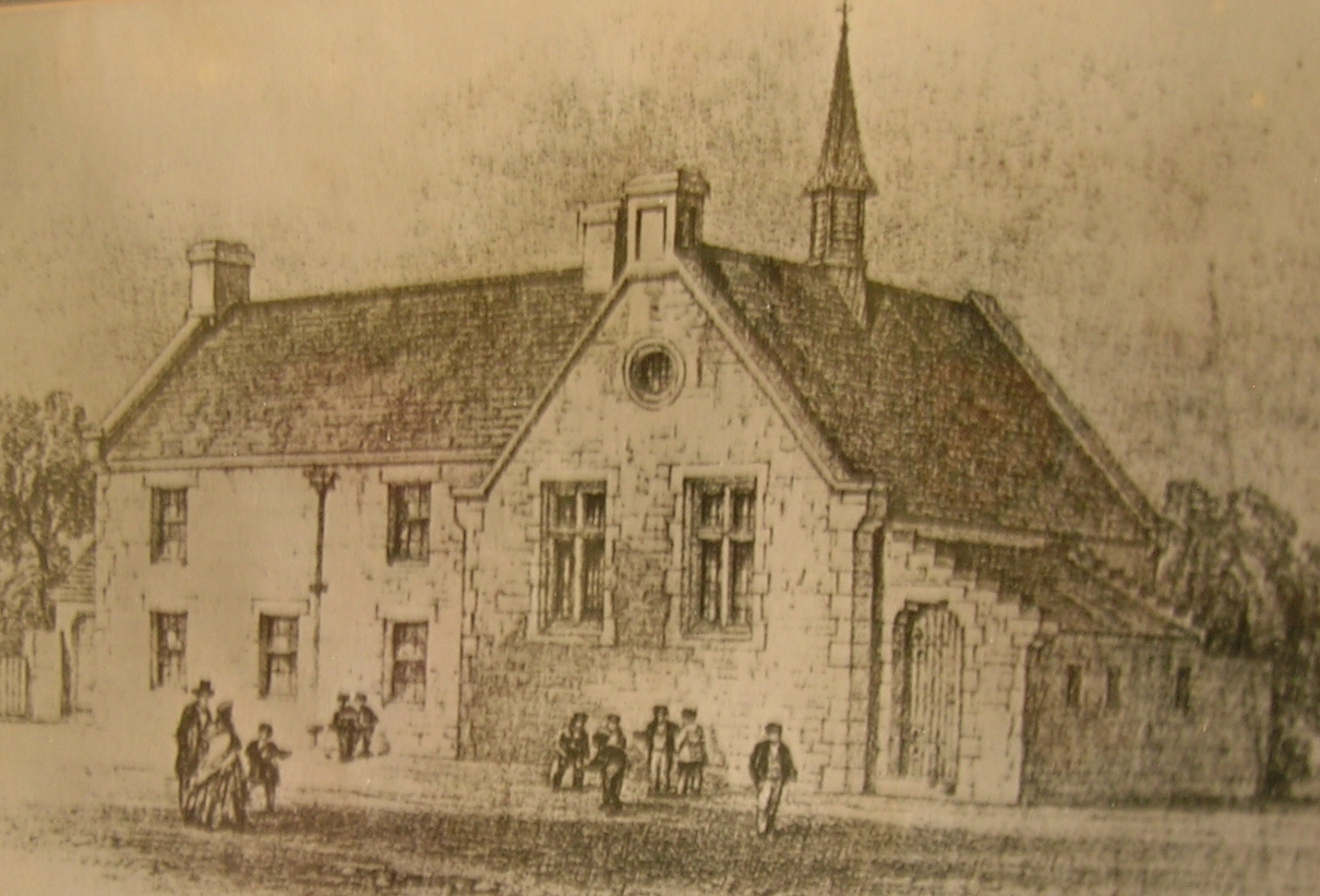
The old school at Kingsford, East Ayrshire

In the 16th century the Reformation had led to a disestablishment of the monastic and choir schools and the ambition to create a system of parish schools. This was enshrined in legislation in 1696. By the late 17th century there was a largely complete network of parish schools in the Lowlands, but in the Highlands basic education was still lacking in many areas.

=== School building ===
Hospitals continued to be built by benefactors, and some of these had very impressive buildings, like that of Robert Gordon's Hospital in Aberdeen, which was designed by William Adam (1689–1748) in the 1730s. However until the late 18th century most school buildings were indistinguishable from houses, but the wealth from the Agricultural Revolution led to a programme of extensive rebuilding. Most schools had a single schoolroom, which could hold up to 80 pupils, taught by a single schoolmaster. There might be smaller adjoining rooms for the teaching of infants and girls. There was sometimes a schoolmaster's house in the same style nearby. Many burgh schools moved away from this model of teaching from the late 18th century as the new commercial and vocational subjects led to the employment of more teachers. From the 1790s urban schools were often rebuilt in a more imposing classical style, by public subscription, or a legacy, and renamed "academies".

=== Democratic myth ===
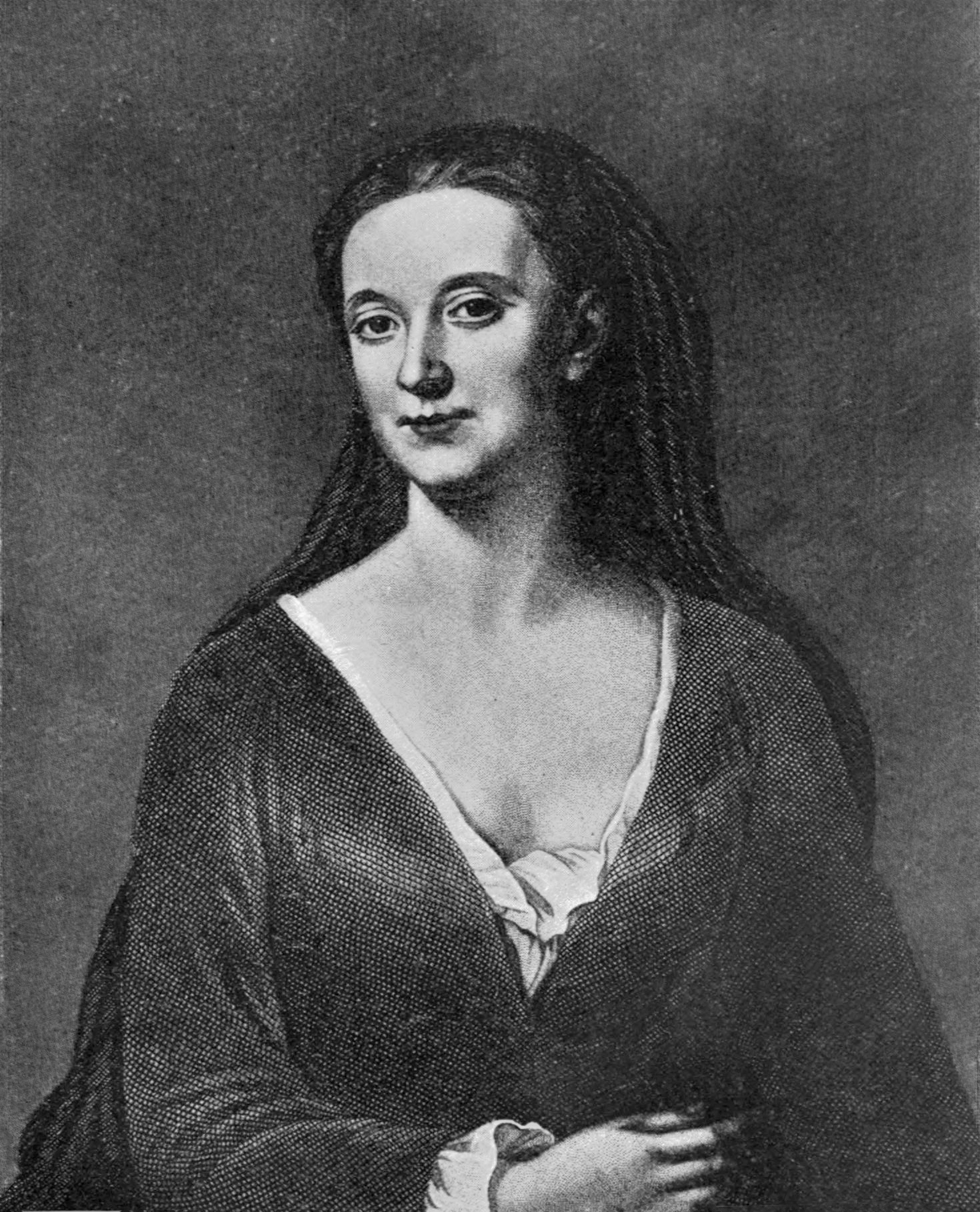
Engraving by G. J. Stodart of Lady Grisell Baillie (1665–1746), after a portrait by Maria Verelst, one of the highly educated women that emerged in this period

One of the effects of the extensive network of parish schools was the growth of the "democratic myth", which in the 19th century created the widespread belief that many a "lad of pairts" had been able to rise up through the system to take high office, and that literacy was much more widespread in Scotland than in neighbouring states, particularly England. Historians now accept that very few boys were able to pursue this route to social advancement and that literacy was not noticeably higher than in comparable nations, as the education in the parish schools was basic and short and attendance was not compulsory.

=== Girls ===
By the 18th century many poorer girls were being taught in dame schools, informally set up by a widow or spinster to teach reading, sewing and cooking. From the mid-17th century there were boarding schools for girls, particularly in Edinburgh and London. These were often family-sized institutions headed by women. Initially these were aimed at the girls of noble households, but by the 18th century there were complaints that the daughters of traders and craftsmen were following their social superiors into these institutions. Among members of the aristocracy, by the early 18th century a girl's education was expected to include basic literacy and numeracy, needlework, cookery and household management, while polite accomplishments and piety were also emphasised. Female illiteracy rates based on signatures among female servants were around 90 per cent from the late 17th to the early 18th centuries, and perhaps 85 per cent for women of all ranks by 1750, compared with 35 per cent for men. Overall literacy rates were slightly higher than in England as a whole, but female rates were much lower than for their English counterparts. There were some notable aristocratic female writers, such as Elizabeth, Lady Wardlaw (1677–1727) and Lady Grizel Baillie (1665–1746). There are 50 autobiographies extant from the late 17th to the early 18th centuries, of which 16 were written by women, and all of which are largely religious in content.

=== Highlands ===
In the Scottish Highlands, popular education was challenged by problems of distance and physical isolation, as well as teachers' and ministers' limited knowledge of Scottish Gaelic, the primary local language. Here the Kirk's parish schools were supplemented by those established from 1709 by the Society in Scotland for Propagating Christian Knowledge. Its aim in the Highlands was to teach English language and end the attachment to Roman Catholicism associated with rebellious Jacobitism. Though the SSPCK schools eventually taught in Gaelic, the overall effect contributed to the erosion of Highland culture. Literacy rates were lower in the Highlands than in comparable Lowland rural society, and despite these efforts illiteracy remained prevalent into the 19th century.

== Universities ==
=== Background ===
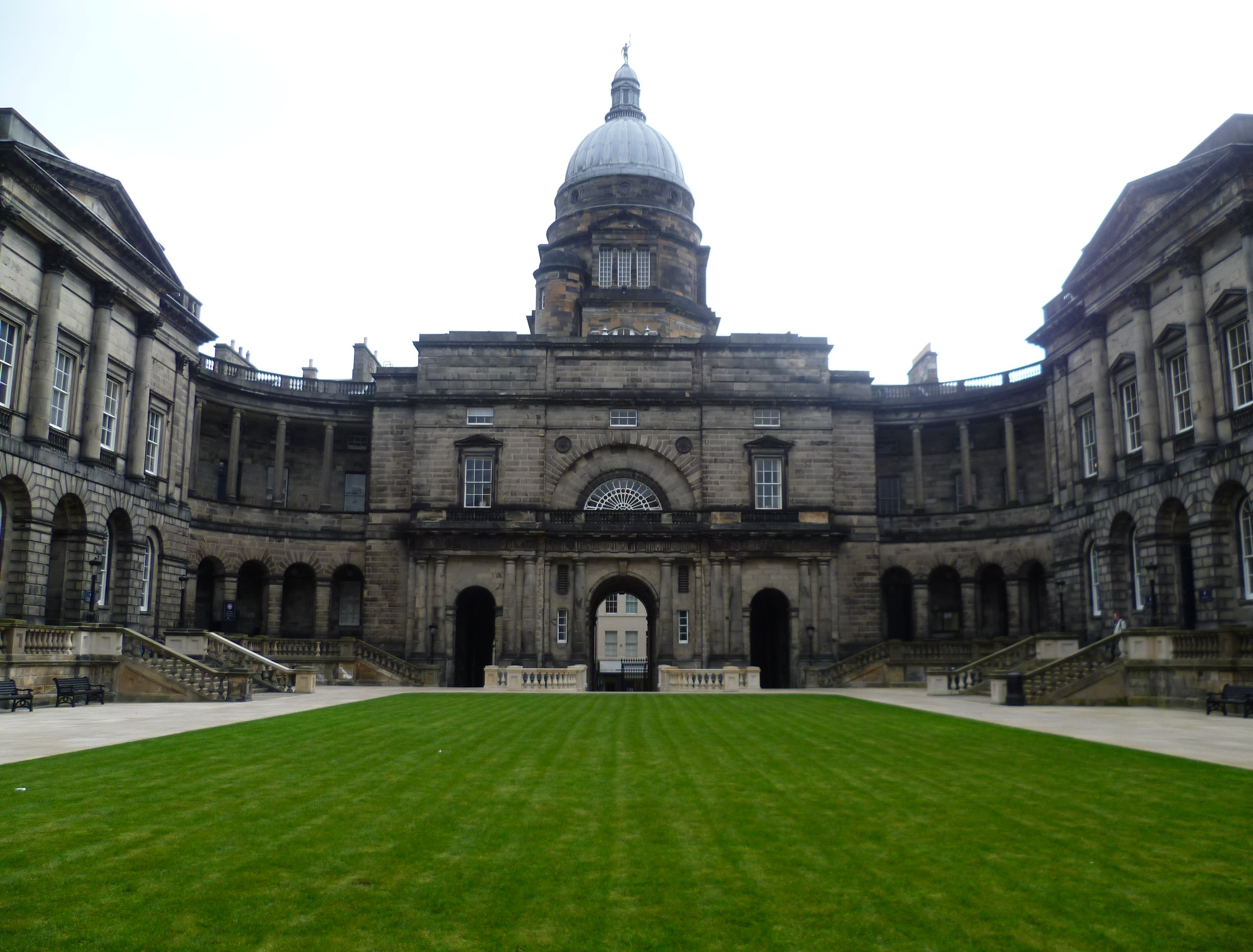
Old College, University of Edinburgh, built to plans drawn up by Robert Adam and completed in the nineteenth century

The five ancient Scottish university colleges recovered from the disruption of the Reformation, civil wars and Restoration with a lecture-based curriculum that was able to embrace economics and science, offering a high-quality liberal education to the sons of the nobility and gentry. They established chairs of mathematics, astronomy was facilitated by the building of observatories, and Robert Sibbald was appointed as the first Professor of Medicine at Edinburgh and he co-founded the Royal College of Physicians of Edinburgh in 1681, helping the universities to become major centres of medical education. The universities would put Scotland at the forefront of Enlightenment thinking.

=== Reform ===
In the 18th century Scotland's universities were transformed from small and parochial institutions, largely for the training of clergy and lawyers, to major intellectual centres at the forefront of Scottish identity and life, seen as fundamental to democratic principles and the opportunity for social advancement for the talented. Chairs of medicine were founded at Marischal College in Aberdeen (1700), Glasgow (1713), St Andrews (1722) and a chair of chemistry and medicine at Edinburgh (1713). It was Edinburgh's medical school, founded in 1732, that came to dominate. By the 1740s it had displaced Leiden as the major centre of medicine in Europe, and was a leading centre in the Atlantic world. The universities still had their difficulties. The economic downturn in the mid-century forced the closure of St Leonard's College in St Andrews, whose properties and staff were merged into St Salvator's College to form the United College of St Salvator and St Leonard.

=== Access ===
Access to Scottish universities was probably more open than in contemporary England, Germany or France. Attendance was less expensive and the student body more representative of society as a whole. Humbler students were aided by a system of bursaries established to aid in the training of the clergy. In this period residence became divorced from the colleges, and students could live much more cheaply and largely unsupervised, at home, with friends or in lodgings in the university towns. The system was flexible, and the curriculum became a modern philosophical and scientific one, in keeping with contemporary needs for improvement and progress. Scotland reaped the intellectual benefits of this system in its contribution to the European Enlightenment.

=== Achievements ===
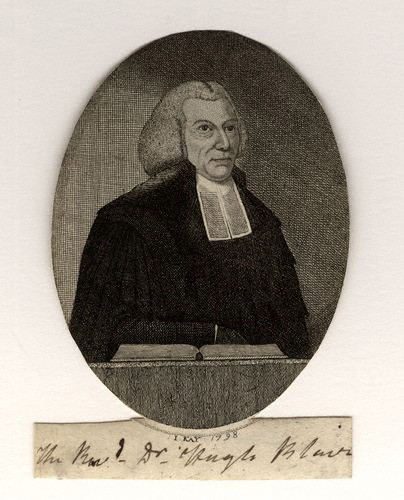
Hugh Blair, Professor of Rhetoric and Belles Lettres at the University of Edinburgh

Many of the key figures of the Scottish Enlightenment were university professors, who developed their ideas in university lectures. The first major philosopher of the Scottish Enlightenment was Francis Hutcheson (1694–1746), who held the Chair of Philosophy at the University of Glasgow from 1729 to 1746. A moral philosopher who produced alternatives to the ideas of Thomas Hobbes, one of his major contributions to world thought was the utilitarian and consequentialist principle that virtue is that which provides, in his words, "the greatest happiness for the greatest numbers". Much of what is incorporated in the scientific method (the nature of knowledge, evidence, experience, and causation) and some modern attitudes towards the relationship between science and religion were developed by his protégés David Hume (1711–76) and Adam Smith (1723–90). Hugh Blair (1718–1800) was a minister of the Church of Scotland and held the Chair of Rhetoric and Belles Lettres at the University of Edinburgh. He produced an edition of the works of Shakespeare and is best known for Sermons (1777–1801), a five-volume endorsement of practical Christian morality, and Lectures on Rhetoric and Belles Lettres (1783), an essay on literary composition, which was to have a major impact on the work of Adam Smith. He was also one of the figures who first drew attention to the Ossian cycle of James Macpherson to public attention.

Hume became a major figure in the sceptical philosophical and empiricist traditions of philosophy. His scepticism prevented him from obtaining chairs at Glasgow and Edinburgh. He and other Scottish Enlightenment thinkers developed what he called a 'science of man', which was expressed historically in works by authors including James Burnett, Adam Ferguson, John Millar and William Robertson, all of whom merged a scientific study of how humans behave in ancient and primitive cultures with a strong awareness of the determining forces of modernity. Indeed, modern sociology largely originated from this movement.

Adam Smith's The Wealth of Nations (1776) is considered to be the first work of modern economics. It had an immediate impact on British economic policy and still frames twenty-first century discussions on globalisation and tariffs. The focus of the Scottish Enlightenment ranged from intellectual and economic matters to the specifically scientific as in the work of William Cullen, physician and chemist, James Anderson, an agronomist, Joseph Black, physicist and chemist, and James Hutton, the first modern geologist.
