= Errol Parish Church =

Church building in Scotland

- North Church; Cathedral of the Carse
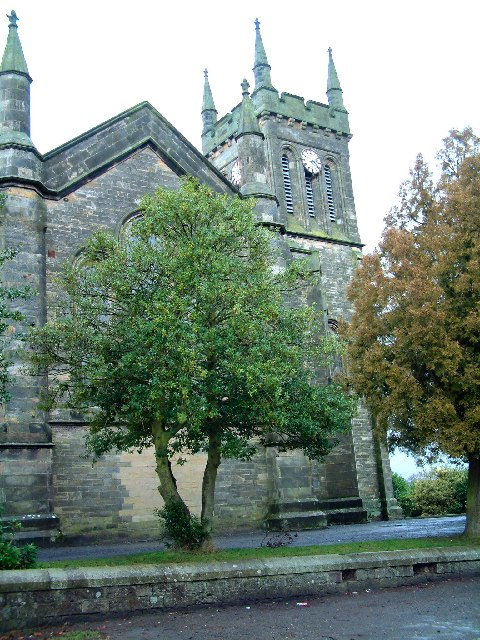
- The church in 2006
- Errol Parish Church
- 56.393°N 3.2121°W
- Denomination: Church of Scotland

History
- Status: Parish Church

Architecture
- Functional status: Active
- Heritage designation: Category A listed building
- Designated: 5 October 1971
- Architect: J.G. Graham
- Groundbreaking: 14 April 1831
- Completed: 17 March 1833
- Construction cost: £3819

Specifications
- Capacity: 1450

Errol Parish Church is a category A listed church in the Scottish village of Errol, Perth and Kinross [LB11589]. It has the informal names of North Church and the Cathedral of the Carse.

== History ==
The Parish of Errol has some of the oldest records in Scotland. Errol was recorded as a parish church c.1198 "...when a settlement was reached between the parson and the monks of Coupar Angus in respect of teind payments from their land at Edderpolles in the parish". Carsegrange, as it was known, had been reclaimed from the marshes of the Carse of Gowrie. It was dedicated by Bishop de Bernham in 1243 and in 1628 the old parishes of Errol and of Inchmartin were united together. Gilbert Hay, lord of Errol, was granted the patronage of the church of Errol in the 1330s, giving him the right to nominate the parish minister. The National Records of Scotland have a Bull of Clement VI in their care dated March 1351 confirming the gift of the parish 'Kirk of Erole and chapel of Inchemartyn' which Gilbert de Hay made over to Cupar's Cistercian abbot.

The medieval church was situated in the centre of the village in the old churchyard. By the seventeenth century the church and steeple were in poor repair; it is known a range of repairs took place in the 1680-90s. Eventually, a new church was built on the same site in 1765.

The owners of Errol Park had the Right of Church Patronage over Errol Parish Church from its restoration in 1711 until patronage was finally abolished in 1874.

In July 1830, when guest preacher Dr Gordon of Edinburgh was giving the evening sermon, the gallery in the church began to give way giving rise to a panicked exodus by the congregation. This event was reported wide and far in the press, with even the Sherborne Mercury in Dorset describing the church as of 'bad construction and inferior workmanship'. Divine worship was observed in the old church for the last time on March 10, 1833, led by the parish minister Rev. James Grierson.

It was decided that the church again needed to be rebuilt and a new site was donated in 1830 by John Lee Allen of Errol Park at North Bank Dykes. The donated ground was 120 metres to the NNE of the former location. The church was designed by James Gillespie Graham and was officially opened on 17 March 1833. The builder of the church, one George Page, charged only £3819 for his services, a very low sum, and subsequently went bankrupt as a result. The church's predecessor was later demolished, although its graveyard still exists. On 14 April 1831, when the foundation stone was laid, a lead casket was placed within with a brass plate with the names of the heritors.

At the Disruption of 1843 the Rev James Grierson (1791–1875), parish minister from 1819, was one of those who left the Church of Scotland and he became Errol's Free Church of Scotland minister, taking many of the parishioners with him.

After the union of the Church of Scotland and the United Free Church in 1929, the Parish church of Errol North was joined with the former United Free Church congregation of Errol South in 1938. Errol North continued as the place of worship and the former South church was for a time used as the church hall.

The church's clock was installed in 1902 in memory of Reverend Robert Graham, who served as the church's minister for 42 years. The church's bells were restored at the same time. The organ and communion table were provided by another bequest in 1905, and in 1915–16, Lady Ogilvie Dalgleish paid for new flooring, the installation of heating and gas lighting, a pulpit and chairs for the priests and elders. Electricity was installed in 1934 at the expense of Mr William Watson of Scone. The silver font dates from 1778 and was removed from the 1765 church. The church has been a category A listed building since 1971, its boundary walls and gate piers being included in the citation.

In July 2017, objections were made concerning the church's bells, which an anonymous complainant claimed were too loud. On the village's social media page, over 400 people posted their support for the continued striking of the bells, and the complaint was later withdrawn.

In September 2022 a Rose Garden was dedicated in the church grounds to those who died during the COVID-19 pandemic when services could not be held in the church.

== Organisation ==
The church is in the Presbytery of Perth. The charges of Errol and St. Madoes were linked in 2025 in line with the Presbytery Mission Plan.
