= List of state schools in Scotland (council areas excluding cities, I–R) =

The following is a partial list of currently operating state schools in the unitary council area of Inverclyde, Midlothian, Moray, North Ayrshire, North Lanarkshire, Orkney Islands, Perth and Kinross and Renfrewshire in Scotland, United Kingdom.

== Inverclyde ==
=== Nursery schools ===
- Binnie Street Children's Centre, Gourock
- Blairmore Nursery School, Greenock
- Bluebird Family Centre, Greenock
- Gibshill Children's Centre, Greenock
- Glenbrae Children's Centre, Greenock
- Glenpark Early Learning Centre, Greenock
- Hillend Children's Centre, Greenock
- Larkfield Children's Centre, Greenock
- Newark Nursery School, Port Glasgow
- Rainbow Family Centre, Port Glasgow
- Wellpark Children's Centre, Greenock

=== Primary schools ===
- Aileymill Primary School, Greenock
- All Saints Primary School, Greenock
- Ardgowan Primary School, Greenock
- Gourock Primary School, Gourock
- Inverkip Primary School, Greenock
- Kilmacolm Primary School, Kilmacolm
- King's Oak Primary School, Greenock
- Lady Alice Primary School, Greenock
- Moorfoot Primary School, Gourock
- Newark Primary School, Port Glasgow
- St. Andrew's Primary School, Greenock
- St. Francis' Primary School, Port Glasgow
- St. John's Primary School, Port Glasgow
- St. Joseph's Primary School, Greenock
- St. Mary's Primary School, Greenock
- St. Michael's Primary School, Port Glasgow
- St. Ninian's Primary School, Gourock
- St. Patrick's Primary School, Greenock
- Wemyss Bay Primary School, Wemyss Bay
- Whinhill Primary School, Greenock

=== Secondary schools ===
- Clydeview Academy, Gourock
- Inverclyde Academy, Greenock
- Notre Dame High School, Greenock
- Port Glasgow High School, Port Glasgow
- St. Columba's High School, Gourock
- St. Stephen's High School, Port Glasgow

=== Special schools ===
- Craigmarloch School, Port Glasgow
- Garvel School, Greenock
- Lomond View Academy, Greenock

== Midlothian ==
=== Nursery schools ===
- Mayfield Nursery School, Dalkeith
- Mount Esk Nursery School, Bonnyrigg

=== Primary schools ===
- Bliston Primary School, Roslin
- Bonnyrigg Primary School, Bonnyrigg
- Burnbrae Primary School, Bonnyrigg
- Cornbank St James' Primary School, Penicuik
- Cuiken Primary School, Penicuik
- Danderhall Primary School, Dalkeith
- Easthouses Primary School, Dalkeith
- Gore Glen Primary School, Gorebridge
- Gorebridge Primary School, Gorebridge
- Hawthornden Primary School, Bonnyrigg
- King's Park Primary School, Dalkeith
- Lasswade Primary School, Bonnyrigg
- Lawfield Primary School, Dalkeith
- Loanhead Primary School, Loanhead
- Mauricewood Primary School, Penicuik
- Mayfield Primary School, Dalkeith
- Moorfoot Primary School, Gorebridge
- Newtongrange Primary School, Newtongrange
- Paradykes Primary School, Loanhead
- Rosewell Primary School, Rosewell
- Roslin Primary School, Roslin
- Sacred Heart Primary School, Penicuik
- St. Andrew's R.C. Primary School, Gorebridge
- St. David's R.C. Primary School, Dalkeith
- St. Luke's R.C. Primary School, Mayfield
- St. Mary's R.C. Primary School, Bonnyrigg
- St. Matthew's R.C. Primary School, Rosewell
- Stobhill Primary School, Gorebridge
- Strathesk Primary School, Penicuik
- Tynewater Primary School, Pathhead
- Woodburn Primary School, Woodburn

=== Secondary schools ===
- Beeslack High School, Penicuik
- Dalkeith High School, Dalkeith
- Lasswade High School Centre, Bonnyrigg
- Newbattle High School, Dalkeith
- Penicuik High School, Penicuik
- St. David's R.C. High School, Dalkeith

=== Special schools ===
- Saltersgate School, Dalkeith
- Support & Reintegration Services, Gowkshill
- Wellington Residential School, Penicuik

== Moray ==
=== Primary schools ===
- Aberlour Primary School, Aberlour
- Alves Primary School, Alves
- Andersons Primary School, Forres
- Applegrove Primary School, Forres
- Bishopmill Primary School, Elgin
- Botriphnie Primary School, Drummuir
- Burghead Primary School, Burghead
- Cluny Primary School, Buckie
- Craigellachie Primary School, Craigellachie
- Crossroads Primary School, Grange
- Cullen Primary School, Cullen
- Dallas Primary School, Dallas
- Dyke Primary School, Dyke
- East End Primary School, Elgin
- Findochty Primary School, Findochty
- Glenlivet Primary School, Ballindalloch
- Greenwards Primary School, Elgin
- Hopeman Primary School, Hopeman
- Hythehill Primary School, Lossiemouth
- Keith Primary School, Keith
- Kinloss Primary School, Kinloss
- Knockando Primary School, Knockando
- Lhanbryde Primary School, Lhanbryde
- Linkwood Primary School, Elgin
- Logie Primary School, Dunphail
- Millbank Primary School, Buckie
- Milne's Primary School, Fochabers
- Mortlach Primary School, Dufftown
- Mosstodloch Primary School, Mosstodloch
- Mosstowie Primary School, Miltonduff
- New Elgin Primary School, Elgin
- Newmill Primary School, Newmill
- Pilmuir Primary School, Forres
- Portessie Primary School, Portessie
- Portgordon Primary School, Portgordon
- Portknockie Primary School, Portknockie
- Rothes Primary School, Rothes
- Rothiemay Primary School, Milltown of Rothiemay
- Seafield Primary School, Elgin
- St. Gerardine Primary School, Lossiemouth
- St. Peter's R.C. Primary School, Buckie
- St. Sylvester's R.C. Primary School, Elgin
- St. Thomas' R.C. Primary School, Keith
- Tomintoul Primary School, Ballindalloch
- West End Primary School, Elgin

=== Secondary schools ===
- Buckie High School, Buckie
- Elgin Academy, Elgin
- Elgin High School, Elgin
- Forres Academy, Forres
- Keith Grammar School, Keith
- Lossiemouth High School, Lossiemouth
- Milne's High School, Fochabers
- Speyside High School, Aberlour

== North Ayrshire ==
=== Nursery schools ===
- Castlepark Early Years Centre, Irvine
- Dalry Early Years Centre, Dalry
- Kilwinning Early Years Centre, Kilwinning
- Largs Early Years Centre, Largs
- Springvale Early Years Centre, Saltcoats

=== Primary schools ===
- Abbey Primary School, Kilwinning
- Annick Primary School, Irvine
- Ardeer Primary School, Stevenston
- Beith Primary School, Beith
- Blacklands Primary School, Kilwinning
- Brodick Primary School, Brodick (Isle of Arran)
- Caledonia Primary School, Saltcoats
- Castlepark Primary School, Irvine
- Corrie Primary School, Corrie (Arran)
- Corsehill Primary School, Kilwinning
- Cumbrae Primary School, Millport (Great Cumbrae)
- Dalry Primary School, Dalry
- Dreghorn Primary School, Dreghorn
- Dykesmains Primary School, Saltcoats
- Elderbank Primary School, Irvine
- Fairlie Primary School, Largs
- Garnock Community Campus, Glengarnock
- Gateside Primary School, Beith
- Glebe Primary School, Irvine
- Glencairn Primary School, Stevenston
- Hayocks Primary School, Stevenston
- Kilmory Primary School, Kilmory (Arran)
- Lamlash Primary School, Lamlash (Arran)
- Largs Primary School, Largs
- Lawthorn Primary School, Irvine
- Loudoun-Montgomery Primary School, Irvine
- Mayfield Primary School, Saltcoats
- Moorpark Primary School, Kilbirnie
- Pennyburn Primary School, Kilwinning
- Pirnmill Primary School, Pirnmill (Arran)
- Shiskine Primary School, Shiskine (Arran)
- Skelmorlie Primary School, Skelmorlie
- Springside Primary School, Springside
- St. Anthony's Primary School, Saltcoats
- St. Bridget's Primary School, Kilbirnie
- St. John Ogilvie Primary School, Irvine
- St. John's Primary School, Stevenston
- St. Luke's Primary School, Kilwinning
- St. Mark's Primary School, Irvine
- St. Mary's Primary School, Largs
- St. Palladius' Primary School, Dalry
- St. Peter's Primary School, Ardrossan
- St. Winning's Primary School, Kilwinning
- Stanley Primary School, Ardrossan
- West Kilbride Primary School, West Kilbride
- Whitehirst Park Primary School, Kilwinning
- Whiting Bay Primary School, Whiting Bay (Arran)
- Winton Primary School, Ardrossan
- Woodlands Primary School, Irvine

=== Secondary schools ===
- Ardrossan Academy, Ardrossan
- Arran High School, Lamlash, Isle of Arran
- Auchenharvie Academy, Stevenston
- Garnock Community Campus, Glengarnock
- Greenwood Academy, Dreghorn
- Irvine Royal Academy, Irvine
- Kilwinning Academy, Kilwinning
- Largs Academy, Largs
- St Matthew's Academy, Saltcoats

=== Special schools ===
- Haysholm School, Irvine
- James McFarlane School, Ardrossan
- James Reid School, Saltcoats
- Stanecastle School, Irvine

== North Lanarkshire ==
=== Nursery schools ===
- Abernethyn Family Learning Centre, Wishaw
- Ailsa Family Learning Centre, Motherwell
- Bellshill Family Learning Centre, Bellshill
- Broomlands Family Learning Centre, Cumbernauld
- Calderview Family Learning Centre, Airdrie
- Craigneuk Family Learning Centre, Craigneuk
- Cumbernauld Village Family Learning Centre, Cumbernauld
- Devonview Family Learning Centre, Airdrie
- Dunbeth Family Learning Centre, Coatbridge
- Forgewood Family Learning Centre, Forgewood
- Innerleithan Family Learning Centre, Wishaw
- Jigsaw Family Learning Centre, Muirhead
- Kildrum Family Learning Centre, Kildrum
- Laburnum Family Learning Centre, Viewpark
- Netherton Family Learning Centre, Wishaw
- Newmains Family Learning Centre, Newmains
- Petersburn Family Learning Centre, Airdrie
- Richard Stewart Family Learning Centre, Airdrie
- Shawhead Family Learning Centre, Coatbridge
- Shotts Family Learning Centre, Shotts
- St Patrick's Family Learning Centre, Kilsyth
- Stepping Stones Family Learning Centre, Stepps
- Wishaw Family Learning Centre, Wishaw

=== Primary schools ===
- Abronhill Primary School, Cumbernauld
- Aitkenhead Primary School, Birkenshaw
- Alexander Peden Primary School, Harthill
- All Saints Primary School, Airdrie
- Allanton Primary School, Shotts
- Auchinloch Primary School, Auchinloch
- Baird Memorial Primary School, Cumbernauld
- Balmalloch Primary School, Kilsyth
- Banton Primary School, Banton
- Bargeddie Primary School, Bargeddie
- Berryhill Primary School, Craigneuk
- Calderbank Primary School, Calderbank
- Calderbridge Primary School, Coltness
- Cambusnethan Primary School, Cambusnethan
- Carbrain Primary School, Cumbernauld
- Cathedral Primary School, Motherwell
- Chapelgreen Primary School, Queenzieburn
- Chapelhall Primary School, Chapelhall
- Chapelside Primary School, Airdrie
- Christ the King Primary School, Holytown
- Chryston Primary School, Chryston
- Clarkston Primary School, Airdrie
- Cleland Primary School, Cleland
- Condorrat Primary School, Condorrat
- Corpus Christi Primary School, Calderbank
- Cumbernauld Primary School, Cumbernauld
- Dykehead Primary School, Shotts
- Eastfield Primary School, Cumbernauld
- Gartcosh Primary School, Gartcosh
- Glenboig Primary School, Glenboig
- Glencairn Primary School, Motherwell
- Glengowan Primary School, Caldercruix
- Glenmanor Primary School, Moodiesburn
- Golfhill Primary School, Airdrie
- Greengairs Primary School, Greengairs
- Greenhill Primary School, Coatbridge
- Hilltop Primary School, Airdrie
- Holy Cross Primary School, Croy
- Holy Family Primary School, Bellshill
- Holytown Primary School, Holytown
- Keir Hardie Memorial Primary School, Newarthill
- Kildrum Primary School, Cumbernauld
- Kilsyth Primary School, Kilsyth
- Kirk O'Shotts Primary School, Salsburgh
- Kirkshaws Primary School, Coatbridge
- Knowetop Primary School, Motherwell
- Ladywell Primary School, Motherwell
- Langloan Primary School, Coatbridge
- Lawmuir Primary School, Bellshill
- Logans Primary School, Motherwell
- Morningside Primary School, Morningside
- Mossend Primary School, Mossend
- Muir Street Primary School, Motherwell
- Muirhouse Primary School, Muirhouse
- Netherton Primary School, Netherton
- New Monkland Primary School, Glenmavis
- New Stevenston Primary School, New Stevenston
- Newarthill Primary School, Newarthill
- Newmains Primary School, Newmains
- Noble Primary School, Bellshill
- Old Monkland Primary School, Coatbridge
- Orchard Primary School, Overtown
- Our Lady & St Francis Primary School, Carfin
- Our Lady & St Joseph's Primary School, Glenboig
- Plains Primary School, Plains
- Ravenswood Primary School, Cumbernauld
- Riverbank Primary School, Coatbridge
- Rochsolloch Primary School, Airdrie
- Sacred Heart Primary School, Bellshill
- Shawhead Primary School, Coatbridge
- St. Aidan's Primary School, Coltness
- St. Aloysius' Primary School, Chapelhall
- St. Andrew's Primary School, Airdrie
- St. Andrew's Primary School, Cumbernauld
- St. Augustine's Primary School, Coatbridge
- St. Barbara's Primary School, Muirhead
- St. Bartholomew's Primary School, Coatbridge
- St. Bernadette's Primary School, Motherwell
- St. Bernard's Primary School, Coatbridge
- St. Brendan's Primary School, Muirhouse
- St. Brigid's Primary School, Newmains
- St. David's Primary School, Plains
- St. Dominic's Primary School, Airdrie
- St. Edward's Primary School, Airdrie
- St. Gerard's Primary School, Bellshill
- St. Helen's Primary School, Condorrat
- St. Ignatius' Primary School, Wishaw
- St. John Paul II Primary School, Viewpark
- St. Joseph's Primary School, Stepps
- St. Kevin's Primary School, Bargeddie
- St. Lucy's Primary School, Cumbernauld
- St. Margaret of Scotland Primary School, Cumbernauld
- St. Mary's Primary School, Airdrie
- St. Mary's Primary School, Cleland
- St. Mary's Primary School, Cumbernauld
- St. Mary's Primary School, Coatbridge
- St. Michael's Primary School, Moodiesburn
- St. Monica's Primary School, Coatbridge
- St. Patrick's Primary School, New Stevenston
- St. Patrick's Primary School, Coatbridge
- St. Patrick's Primary School, Kilsyth
- St. Patrick's Primary School, Shotts
- St. Serf's Primary School, Airdrie
- St. Stephen's Primary School, Coatbridge
- St. Teresa's Primary School, Newarthill
- St. Thomas' Primary School, Wishaw
- St. Timothy's Primary School, Coatbridge
- Stane Primary School, Shotts
- Stepps Primary School, Stepps
- Tannochside Primary School, Tannochside
- Thornlie Primary School, Wishaw
- Tollbrae Primary School, Airdrie
- Townhead Primary School, Coatbridge
- Victoria Primary School, Airdrie
- Westfield Primary School, Cumbernauld
- Whitelees Primary School, Cumbernauld
- Wishaw Academy Primary School, Wishaw
- Woodlands Primary School, Cumbernauld

=== Secondary schools ===
- Airdrie Academy, Airdrie
- Bellshill Academy, Bellshill
- Braidhurst High School, Motherwell
- Brannock High School, Newarthill
- Calderhead High School, Shotts
- Caldervale High School, Airdrie
- Cardinal Newman High School, Bellshill
- Chryston High School, Chryston
- Clyde Valley High School, Wishaw
- Coatbridge High School, Coatbridge
- Coltness High School, Wishaw
- Cumbernauld Academy, Cumbernauld
- Dalziel High School, Motherwell
- Greenfaulds High School, Cumbernauld
- Kilsyth Academy, Kilsyth
- Our Lady's High School, Cumbernauld
- Our Lady's High School, Motherwell
- St Aidan's High School, Wishaw
- St. Ambrose High School, Coatbridge
- St. Andrew's High School, Coatbridge
- St. Margaret's High School, Airdrie
- St. Maurice's High School, Cumbernauld
- Taylor High School, New Stevenston

=== Special schools ===
- Bothwellpark High School, Motherwell
- Buchanan High School, Coatbridge
- Clydeview School and Nursery, Motherwell
- Drumpark Primary School, Coatbridge
- Fallside Secondary School, Viewpark
- Firpark Primary School, Motherwell
- Glencryan School, Cumbernauld
- Mavisbank School, Airdrie
- Pentland School, Coatbridge
- Portland High School, Coatbridge
- Redburn School, Cumbernauld
- Willowbank School, Coatbridge

== Orkney Islands ==
=== Nursery schools ===
- Peediebreeks Nursery, Kirkwall
- Strynd Nursery, Kirkwall
- Willow Tree Nursery, Kirkwall

=== Primary schools ===
- Burray Primary School, Burray
- Dounby Primary School, Dounby
- Eday Primary School, Eday
- Evie Primary School, Evie
- Firth Primary School, Finstown
- Flotta Primary School, Flotta
- Glaitness Primary School, Kirkwall
- Hope Primary School, St. Margaret's Hope
- North Ronaldsay Primary School, North Ronaldsay
- North Walls Community School, Hoy
- Orphir Primary School, Orphir
- Papay Primary School, Papa Westray
- Papdale Primary School, Kirkwall
- Rousay Primary School, Rousay
- Sanday Community School, Sanday
- St. Andrew's Primary School, Toab
- Shapinsay Primary School, Shapinsay
- Stenness Primary School, Stenness
- Stromness Primary School, Stromness
- Stronsay Community School, Stronsay
- Westray Community School, Westray

=== Secondary schools ===
- Kirkwall Grammar School, Kirkwall
- North Walls Junior High School, Hoy (age 11–14)
- Sanday Junior High School, Sanday (age 11–16 years)
- Stromness Academy, Stromness
- Stronsay Junior High School, Stronsay (age 11–16 years)
- Westray Junior High School, Westray (age 11–16 years)

=== Special schools ===
- Glaitness Aurrida School, Kirkwall

== Perth and Kinross ==
=== Nursery schools ===
- Breadalbane Academy (nursery), Aberfeldy
- City of Perth Early Childhood Centre, Perth
- Community School of Auchterarder (nursery), Auchterarder
- Pitlochry High School (nursery), Pitlochry
- St John's Academy (nursery), Perth

=== Primary schools ===
- Abernethy Primary School, Abernethy
- Abernyte Primary School, Inchture
- Aberuthven Primary School, Aberuthven
- Alyth Primary School, Alyth
- Arngask Primary School, Glenfarg
- Auchtergaven Primary School, Bankfoot
- Balbeggie Primary School, Balbeggie
- Blackford Primary School, Blackford
- Blair Atholl Primary School, Bridge of Tilt
- Braco Primary School, Braco
- Breadalbane Academy (primary), Aberfeldy
- Burrelton Primary School, Burrelton
- Cleish Primary School, Kinross
- Collace Primary School, Kinrossie
- Comrie Primary School, Comrie
- Community School of Auchterarder (primary), Auchterarder
- Coupar Angus Primary School, Coupar Angus
- Craigie Primary School, Perth
- Crieff Primary School, Crieff
- Dunbarney Primary School, Bridge of Earn
- Dunning Primary School, Dunning
- Errol Primary School, Errol
- Forgandenny Primary School, Forgandenny
- Fossoway Primary School, Kinross
- Glendelvine Primary School, Caputh
- Glenlyon Primary School, Aberfeldy
- Goodlyburn Primary School, Perth
- Grandtully Primary School, Pitlochry
- Guildtown Primary School, Perth
- Inch View Primary School, Perth
- Inchture Primary School, Inchture
- Invergowrie Primary School, Invergowrie
- Kenmore Primary School, Kenmore
- Kettins Primary School, Kettins
- Kinloch Rannoch Primary School, Kinloch Rannoch
- Kinnoull Primary School, Perth
- Kinross Primary School, Kinross
- Kirkmichael Primary School, Kirkmichael
- Letham Primary School, Perth
- Logiealmond Primary School, Perth
- Logierait Primary School, Pitlochry
- Longforgan Primary School, Longforgan
- Luncarty Primary School, Luncarty
- Madderty Primary School, Crieff
- Meigle Primary School, Meigle
- Methven Primary School, Methven
- Milnathort Primary School, Milnathort
- Moncreiffe Primary School, Perth
- Murthly Primary School, Murthly
- Muthill Primary School, Muthill
- Newhill Primary School, Blairgowrie
- Oakbank Primary School, Perth
- Our Lady's R.C. Primary School, Perth
- Pitcairn Primary School, Almondbank
- Pitlochry High School (primary), Pitlochry
- Portmoak Primary School, Kinross
- Rattray Primary School, Blairgowrie
- Riverside Primary School, Perth
- Robert Douglas Memorial Primary School, Scone
- Royal School of Dunkeld Primary School, Dunkeld
- Ruthvenfield Primary School, Perth
- St. Dominic's R.C. Primary School, Crieff
- St. John's R.C. Academy (primary), Perth
- St. Madoes Primary School, Glencarse
- St. Ninian's Episcopal Primary School, Perth
- St. Stephen's R.C. Primary School, Blairgowrie
- Stanley Primary School, Stanley, Perthshire
- Tulloch Primary School, Perth
- Viewlands Primary School, Perth

=== Secondary schools ===
- Bertha Park High School, Perth
- Blairgowrie High School, Blairgowrie
- Breadalbane Academy, Aberfeldy
- Community School of Auchterarder, Auchterarder
- Crieff High School, Crieff
- Kinross High School, Kinross
- Perth Academy, Perth
- Perth Grammar School, Perth
- Perth High School, Perth
- Pitlochry High School, Pitlochry
- St John's Academy, Perth

=== Special schools ===
- Fairview School, Perth

== Renfrewshire ==
=== Nursery schools ===
- Douglas Street Early Learning and Childcare Centre, Paisley
- Ferguslie Early Learning and Childcare Centre, Ferguslie Park
- Foxlea Early Learning and Childcare Centre, Foxbar
- Glenburn Early Learning and Childcare Centre, Glenburn
- Glendee Early Learning and Childcare Centre, Renfrew
- Glenfield Early Learning and Childcare Centre, Paisley
- Hillview Early Learning and Childcare Centre, Paisley
- Hugh Smiley Early Learning and Childcare Centre, Paisley
- Moorpark Early Learning and Childcare Centre, Renfrew
- Paisley Early Learning and Childcare Centre, Paisley
- Riverbrae Early Learning and Childcare Centre, Linwood
- Spateston Early Learning and Childcare Centre, Johnstone
- West Johnstone Early Learning and Childcare Centre, Johnstone

=== Primary schools ===
- Arkleston Primary School, Renfrew
- Auchenlodment Primary School, Johnstone
- Bargarran Primary School, Erskine
- Barsail Primary School, Erskine
- Bishopton Primary School, Bishopton
- Brediland Primary School, Paisley
- Bridge of Weir Primary School, Bridge of Weir
- Bushes Primary School, Paisley
- Cochrane Castle Primary School, Johnstone
- Dargavel Primary School, Bishopton
- East Fulton Primary School, Linwood
- Fordbank Primary School, Johnstone
- Gallowhill Primary School, Paisley
- Glencoats Primary School, Ferguslie Park
- Heriot Primary School, Paisley
- Houston Primary School, Houston
- Howwood Primary School, Howwood
- Inchinnan Primary School, Inchinnan
- Kilbarchan Primary School, Kilbarchan
- Kirklandneuk Primary School, Renfrew
- Langbank Primary School, Langbank
- Langcraigs Primary School, Paisley
- Lochfield Primary School, Paisley
- Lochwinnoch Primary School, Lochwinnoch
- Mossvale Primary School, Paisley
- Newmains Primary School, Renfrew
- Our Lady of Peace Primary School, Linwood
- Ralston Primary School, Ralston
- Rashielea Primary School, Erskine
- St. Anne's Primary School, Erskine
- St. Anthony's Primary School, Johnstone
- St. Catherine's Primary School, Paisley
- St. Charles' Primary School, Paisley
- St. David's Primary School, Johnstone
- St. Fergus' Primary School, Paisley
- St. Fillan's Primary School, Houston
- St. James' Primary School, Paisley
- St. James' Primary School, Renfrew
- St. John Bosco Primary School, Erskine
- St. John Ogilvie Primary School, Paisley
- St. Margaret's Primary School, Johnstone
- St. Mary's Primary School, Paisley
- St. Paul's Primary School, Paisley
- St. Peter's Primary School, Paisley
- Thorn Primary School, Johnstone
- Todholm Primary School, Paisley
- Wallace Primary School, Elderslie
- West Primary School, Paisley
- Williamsburgh Primary School, Paisley
- Woodlands Primary School, Linwood

=== Secondary schools ===
- Castlehead High School, Paisley
- Gleniffer High School, Paisley
- Gryffe High School, Houston
- Johnstone High School, Johnstone
- Linwood High School, Linwood
- Paisley Grammar School, Paisley
- Park Mains High School, Erskine
- Renfrew High School, Renfrew
- St Andrew's Academy, Paisley
- St Benedict's Roman Catholic High School, Linwood
- Trinity High School, Renfrew

=== Special schools ===
- Mary Russell School, Paisley
- Riverbrae School, Linwood

== Other schools in Scotland ==
- List of independent schools in Scotland
- List of state schools in Scotland (city council areas)
- List of state schools in Scotland (council areas excluding cities, A–D)
- List of state schools in Scotland (council areas excluding cities, E–H)
- List of state schools in Scotland (council areas excluding cities, S–W)

== See also ==
- Education in the United Kingdom
- Education in Scotland
- Education Scotland
