= List of Schools of Ambition =

The following is a list of the schools in Scotland that participated in the Schools of Ambition programme.

By unitary council area.

== Aberdeen City ==
- St Machar Academy

== Aberdeenshire ==
- Alford Academy
- Fraserburgh Academy

== Angus ==
- Arbroath Academy
- Brechin High School

== Argyll & Bute ==
- Islay High School
- Rothesay Academy

== Clackmannanshire ==
- Alloa Academy
- Alva Academy
- Lornshill Academy

== Dumfries and Galloway ==
- Castle Douglas High School
- Wallace Hall

== Dundee City ==
- Braeview Academy

== East Ayrshire ==
- Doon Academy

== East Dunbartonshire ==
- St Ninian's High School

== East Lothian ==
- Dunbar Grammar School

== East Renfrewshire ==
- Barrhead High School

== Edinburgh City ==
- Gracemount High School
- Queensferry High School

== Falkirk ==
- Braes High School

== Fife ==
- Kirkcaldy High School
- Kirkland High School

== Glasgow City ==
- Castlemilk High School
- Springburn Academy
- St Margaret Mary's Secondary School
- St Paul's High School

== Highland Region ==
- Charleston Academy
- Inverness High School

== Inverclyde ==
- Port Glasgow High School
- St Stephen's High School

== Midlothian ==
- Newbattle Community High School

== Moray ==
- Lossiemouth High School

== North Ayrshire ==
- Auchenharvie Academy

== North Lanarkshire ==
- Cardinal Newman High School
- Kilsyth Academy
- Taylor High School

== Orkney ==
- Kirkwall Grammar
- North Walls Community
- Pierowall Junior
- Sanday Junior High School
- Stromness Academy
- Stronsay Junior High School

== Perth and Kinross ==
- Blairgowrie High School

== Renfrewshire ==
- Renfrew High School

== Scottish Borders ==
- Hawick High School

== Shetland ==
- Anderson High School

== South Ayrshire ==
- Carrick Academy

== South Lanarkshire ==
- Lanark Learning Community

== Stirling ==
- St Modan's RC High School

== West Dunbartonshire ==
- Our Lady & St Patrick's High School

== West Lothian ==
- Burnhouse School

== Western Isles ==
- The Nicholson Institute
