= Linwood, Renfrewshire =

Coordinates: 55.847°N 4.502°W

Linwood: Scots: Linwuid
- Town
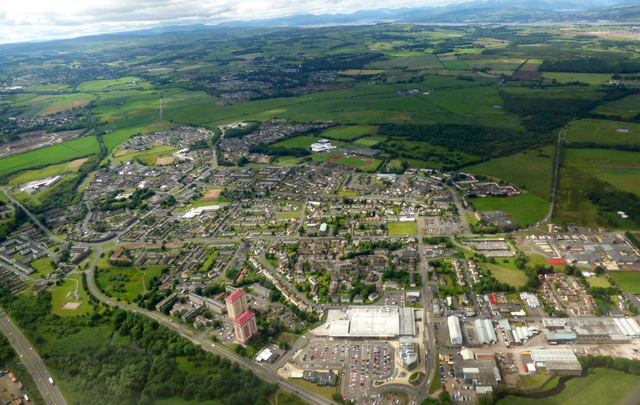
- Linwood from above Black Cart Water

- Location within Renfrewshire
- Population: 8,450 (2020)
- OS grid reference: NS435645
- Council area: Renfrewshire
- Lieutenancy area: Renfrewshire
- Country: Scotland
- Sovereign state: United Kingdom
- Post town: PAISLEY
- Postcode district: PA3
- Dialling code: 01505
- Police: Scotland
- Fire: Scottish
- Ambulance: Scottish
- UK Parliament: Paisley and Renfrewshire South
- Scottish Parliament: Renfrewshire South

Linwood (Scots: Linwuid) is a town in Renfrewshire in the west central Lowlands of Scotland, 14 miles (23 kilometres) west of Glasgow. It is about 1 1/2 miles (2.5 kilometres) northeast of Johnstone and west of Paisley close to the Black Cart Water and the A737 road.

== Etymology ==
Linwood comes from the Anglo-Saxon worǒ 'enclosure' (not wood) with an uncertain first element. Other source suggests the following; The village name is a hybrid meaning 'wood by the pool' Llyn (Cumbric) 'pool'; wudu (Anglo-Saxon) 'wood'.

Originally known as 'The Linwood', the settlement dates back to the fourteenth century when Linwood consisted of a small collection of farms and dwellings concentrated on the banks of the Black Cart. It was given the collective name The Linwood, with early mails showing it as 'Ye Lynwode'.

== History ==
=== Roman era ===
Roman forts at Barochan Hill and Whitemoss in Bishopton, would have provided support to other forts along the Antonine Wall, on the opposite side of the River Clyde at Duntochar, ( linked by a causeway). This close proximity to Linwood has fueled anecdotal evidence that suggests a patrol of Romans were hindered from plundering the rural farms by the wet, boggy land of the Linwood Moss. There is a historical article, quoted below, that has a different version of events but which if either is true.

"In an attempt to prevent local tribespeople from cloaking themselves in the shadows of the trees and launching counterattacks, the Roman forces proceeded to cut down an area which is now known as Linwood Moss and serves as a crucial habitat for wildlife."

=== 21st century ===
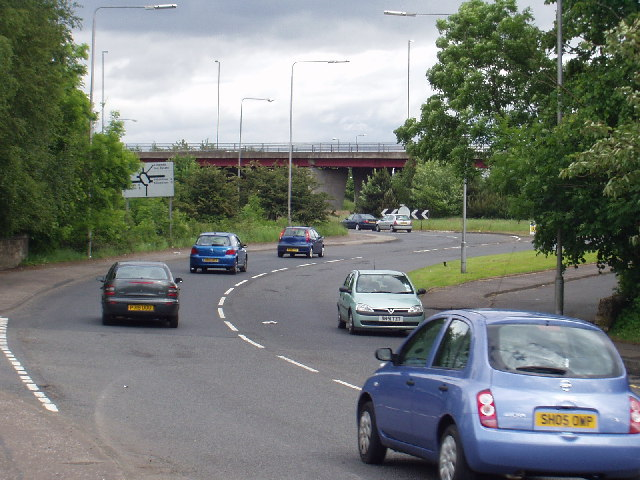
Junction between A761 and A737 at Linwood, 2005

On 10 August 2006, a local community action group, Linwood Sucks, initiated what became a six-year campaign to expose various problems with contaminated land in the area and to highlight the decline of the original town centre. Despite the negative overtones of their name, the group along with qualified collaborators and community support, conducted a great deal of technical research which contributed to a variety of positive changes in the town. One of the initial objectives included research into the lack of playground facilities for the local children. This objective was carried on successfully by Linwood Active, another group, who would later attain charitable status and redevelop the playground facility at Kintyre Park.

Other problems highlighted by Linwood Sucks included highly toxic land in various public areas such as the Erskinefauld Road playground, Cowal Drive playground and in the ongoing building of new housing and a care home facility. The background to this contamination is well documented in what Tom Burke, editor and researcher, had named the Linwood Toxic Timeline. In summary old mine shafts scattered over the Erskinefauld and Brediland areas had been used as dumping grounds for chemical waste from the former Brediland Chemical Works. More recent contamination problems are credited to the Middleton Road incinerator (1974–1992) and the nearby landfill on the Moss Road. As the Linwood moss landfill prepared to close by November 2006, the Reilly quarry between Linwood and Bishopton was being prepped to be used as a landfill by May 2007. Also of concern whilst being of historical interest is the anecdotal evidence of "Daisy Hill" being a mass cholera grave on the site which would become the Golden Pheasant Hotel, later re-purposed as Mount Royal Homeless unit before being demolished, November 2010, and the Mosswood Care home facility being built. Adjacent to this site, an area known by the older generation as Dent's Corner, is another piece of contaminated waste-ground, the former site of Dents & Johstone Ltd who worked with substances such as polonium in the development of illuminated aircraft cockpit instrumentation.

=== Recent history ===
In December 2011, Linwood received the annual "Plook on the Plinth" award for "Scotland's most dismal town", part of the Urban Realm magazine's 'Carbuncle Awards'. The magazine suggests that the award is intended to cause debate and inspire redevelopment.

The Linwood Community Development Trust was formed on 7 December 2011.

=== Linwood regeneration ===
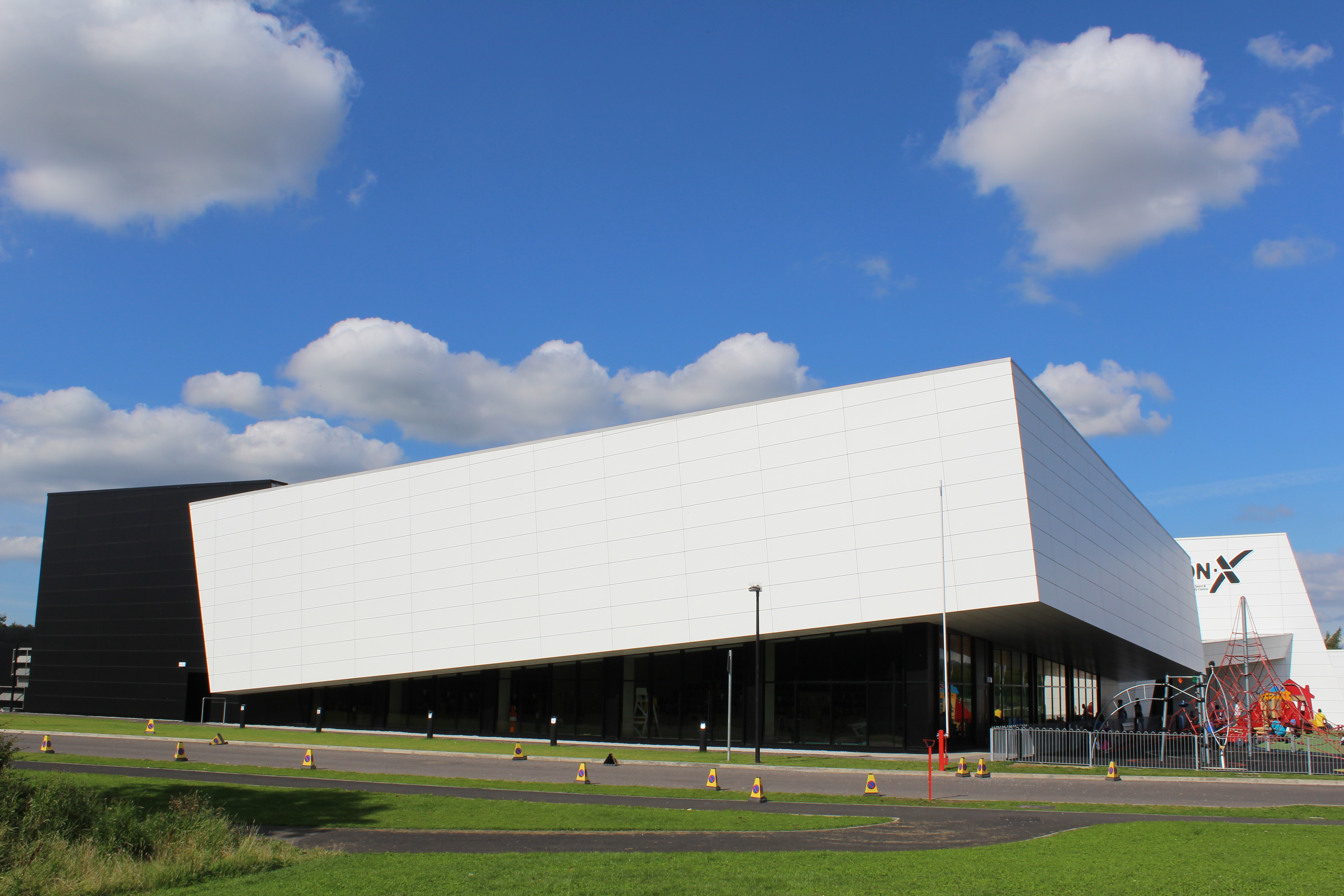
ON-X Linwood Sports Centre

Linwood has undergone a major redevelopment which began in 2008:

- Four schools have been rebuilt or refurbished
- New housing stock – private and social
- £24 million sports centre – home to several sports clubs
- Tesco town centre regeneration
- Community care home
- Kintyre Park playground facilities

== Economy ==
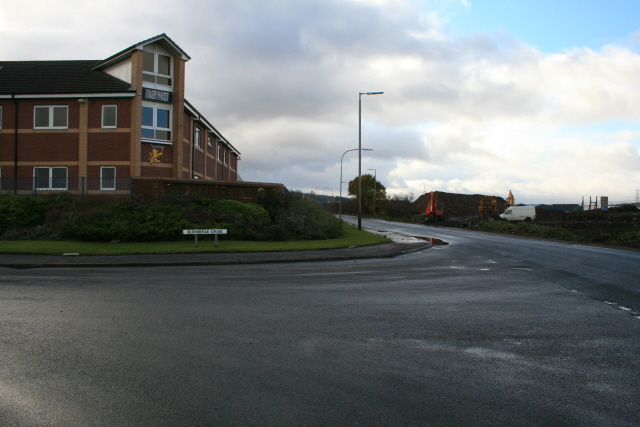
Brookfield House, HQ of Malcolm Group

=== Cotton and other industries ===
Linwood owes its existence to the building of cotton and flax mills there at the end of the 18th century. In the following century there were shale coal oil works, ironstone and cotton production businesses in the village. There was a bleachfield at Linwood connected to the spinning mill there. A paper mill was also established as can be seen on older maps.

=== Car production ===
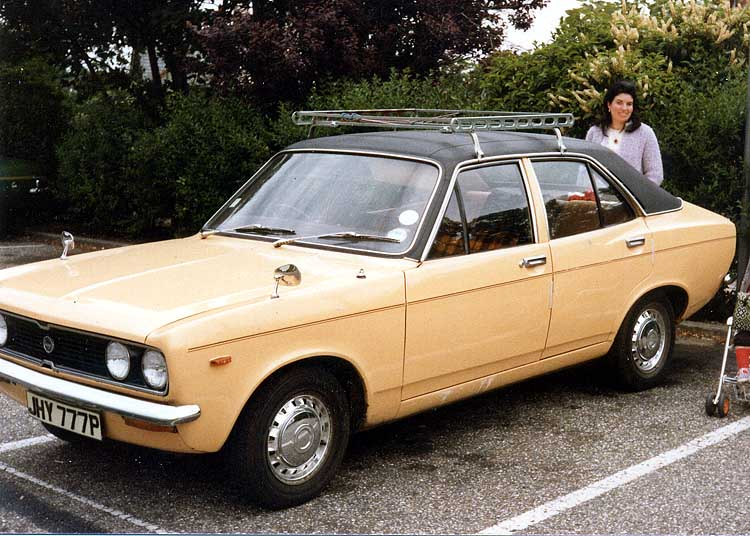
A 1976 Hillman Avenger (seen in 1982)

The expansion and economy of Linwood from 1961 onwards relied heavily on the Rootes, later Chrysler then Peugeot Talbot car plant, and the associated Pressed Steel Company body parts pressing facility.

Construction at the car factory began in 1961 to produce the Hillman Imp, a revolutionary small car which went into production when the factory was opened on 2 May 1963, and was not discontinued until 1976. The factory, opened by the Duke of Edinburgh, had the advantage of a direct rail link, which allowed cars to be transported by rail to places all over Britain. The opening and production can be seen in the Rootes Group's 20-minute film. It later produced the Hillman Avenger (later badged as a Chrysler and finally a Talbot) from 1970 and the Imp's successor, the Sunbeam.

After Chrysler UK was bought by Peugeot Talbot, a review of the plant and associated models decided to close the Linwood plant in favour of retaining the Ryton plant near Coventry. Linwood was closed in 1981 with most of the factory demolished soon afterwards. The final remaining part was demolished in 1996.

The closure left mass unemployment. The state of the town was immortalised in the song "Letter from America" by The Proclaimers; the lyrics "Linwood no more" referred to the closure of the car factory.

The site of the former Linwood Car Plant has been redeveloped into a successful retail park, known by some as the Linwood Phoenix and as the Paisley Phoenix by others. It includes various fast food outlets and the very popular Showcase Cinema and a 24hr Asda.

=== Shopping centre ===
The 2001 S1 Jobs TV advert was perhaps the first red flag that Linwood was plummeting into decline. It featured a miserable character, who became known as "Lavvy Heid" and was filmed in the already dilapidated town centre, shopping area, not just any old shopping centre, but in fact one that had been promoted as Scotlands' first regional shopping centre. Ironically, the advert was banned as was seen to be promoting bullying behaviour in 2011, but the level of real life corporate bullying at the regional shopping centre had been ongoing since 2000 and would not be over until the former regional shopping centre had been demolished and Linwood crowned as a Tesco Town.

Tesco has come under fire again, this time for using a property company to act as a front to buy a shopping centre which it then, allegedly, let run into disrepair so as to step in and buy it a few years later. Residents and MSPs in Renfrewshire were horrified to learn that the supermarket giant – already renowned for controversy – used local property developer Balmore Properties to buy Linwood town centre’s precinct in 2001 for £1.7 million.

== Culture ==
=== Culture and media ===
- In 1987, as mentioned above in relation to the demise of the ever name-changing "Linwood Car Plant", The Proclaimers put Linwood on the map of a declining industrial Scotland, along with other towns with those words "Linwood No More" in the lyrics of "Letter From America".
- Jeff Torrington (31 December 1935 – 11 May 2008) – former Linwood car plant employee and writer. The Devil's Carousel (1998) drew on the decline of a fictionalised version of the Rootes/Chrysler car plant at Linwood.
- In 2014, Paul Coulter's play Linwood No More was performed at the Tron Theatre in Glasgow.
- Linwood, and the closure of the car factory, were also the inspiration for the title track of the 2015 Simon Kempston album, The Last Car.
- A book was published in late 2023 entitled Linwood Through The Ages by Dougie Ross, which extensively covers the whole history of Linwood.

=== Sport ===
- In the 1880s, a football club from the town, Clippens F.C., played in the Scottish Cup.
- UEFA Champions League winner Paul Lambert, grew up in Linwood.
- Former Dundee United F.C. captain, Paul Paton, is also from Linwood.
- Goalkeeper Billy Thomson grew up in Linwood.
- John Hillcoat, former Dunfermline Athletic, Clyde, Hamilton Academical, Partick Thistle, Clydebank, Morton, Queen of the South, St Mirren, Dumbarton, Stranraer, Ayr United, Brechin City and Stenhousemuir goalkeeper.
- Drew Wilson, cyclist, who represented Scotland at the Commonwealth Games in 1986, 1994 & 1998.

== Education ==
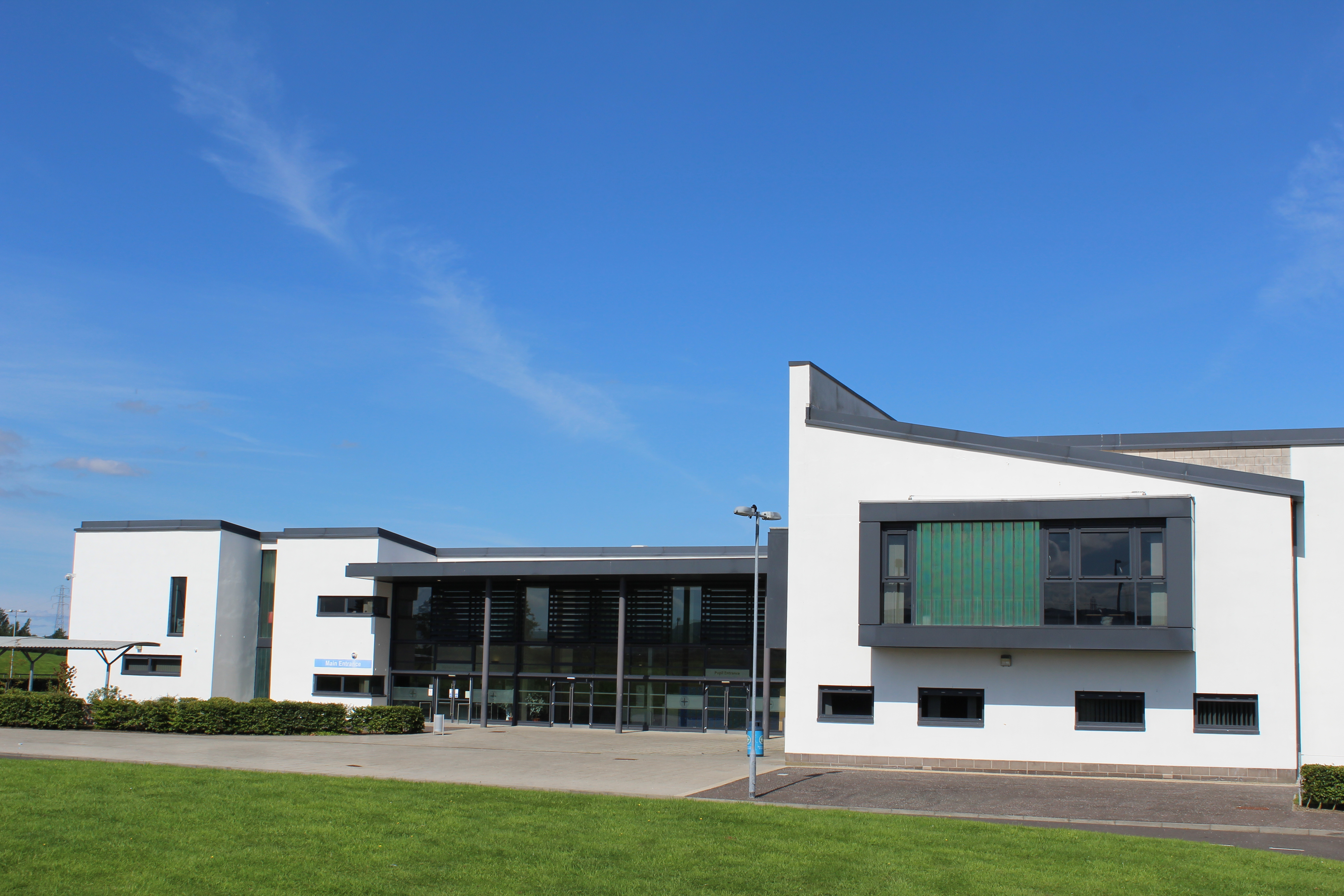
St Benedict's RC High

The town has the following educational establishments:

Nursery

- East Fulton
- Our Lady of Peace
- Linwood community childcare

Primary schools

- East Fulton
- Our Lady of Peace
- Woodlands

Secondary schools

- Linwood High
- St Benedict's RC High

Special education

- Linwood's Riverbrae School (a special education school) opened in August 2017, it replaced Clippens (formerly Mossedge Primary), the Hollybush Pre-5 Centre and Kersland Schools.

== Transport ==
Linwood is on the A761 close to its junction with the A737 which links the town to Glasgow Airport and the motorway network to the east, and Garnock Valley and the North Ayrshire coast to the south-west.

Local transport is served by McGill's Bus Services who have several services that link the town to the nearby towns of Johnstone, Bridge of Weir, Houston and Paisley, and it also has services which connect the town to Braehead and Glasgow.

Rail transport can be accessed from the nearby Johnstone railway station, which includes a two level park and ride car park. This route provides services westwards to Ayr, Troon, Stranraer, Irvine, Kilwinning, Largs, Ardrossan and Lochwinnoch and eastwards to Paisley, Hillington, Cardonald and Glasgow Central.
