= Malcolm Group =

Scottish logistics company

W. H. Malcolm Ltd
- Type: Private
- Industry: Logistics
- Founded: 1921 (As W.H. Malcolm); 1960 (As W.H. Malcolm Ltd.)
- Founder: Walter Malcolm (As W.H. Malcolm); Donald Malcolm (As W.H. Malcolm Ltd.)
- Headquarters: Linwood, Renfrewshire, Scotland
- Number of locations: 15 Logistics Depots (2022) 2 Construction Quarries (2022) 3 Rail Terminals (2022)
- Key people: Donald Malcolm (-2003); Andrew Malcolm, CEO
- Services: Logistics, Construction, Freight Rail, Vehicle Maintenance
- Revenue: ▲£206 million (2019)
- Net income: ▼£8.9 million (2019)
- Parent: Malcolm Of Brookfield (Holdings) Limited
- Website: www.whmalcolm.com www.malcolmgroup.co.uk

W. H. Malcolm Ltd (trading as the Malcolm Group) is a logistics company based in Linwood, Renfrewshire, Scotland. The company provides logistic services (Malcolm Logistics and Malcolm Rail) including road and rail transport, warehousing, and terminal management. Other group activities include civil engineering, plant hire, construction (Malcolm Construction), primarily groundwork and vehicle maintenance.

== History ==
The origins of the company trace to the 1920s. In the 1940s, Donald Malcolm left school in his early teenage years and started running his family's small coal business, which had a single truck alongside a horse-drawn cart. The business grew and in the 1950s, the business entered into a partnership with Grampian Holdings; thereafter, it expanded into road construction through an equipment hire business, and a shale bing business.

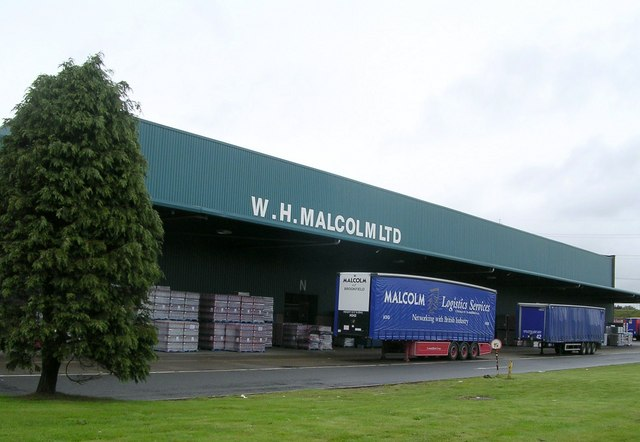
Depot near Newhouse

In 1960, when the company was acquired by the industrial holding company Grampian Holdings Plc, the company's assets included 37 vehicles and seven construction equipment items. Donald Malcolm remained in charge of W H Malcolm after the takeover. Donald Malcolm died in 2003; two of his sons Walter and Andrew took over management of the business.

In 2002, Grampian Holdings Plc, which was public listed on the London Stock Exchange, was renamed The Malcolm Group Plc. In 2005, the company was taken back into private ownership by the Malcolm family and the Bank of Scotland plc.

During the mid-2020s, the company was investing into increasing efficiency at its Loanhead Quarry via new heavy machinery, as well as the construction of a second recycling plant in Glasgow. By 2024, the company was involved in several different sectors, include civil engineering, plant hire, construction, primary groundwork and vehicle maintenance. Furthermore, it held operating licences for 748 trucks and 1,167 trailers.

== Donald Malcolm Heritage Centre ==
The Donald Malcolm Heritage Centre was built by Andrew Malcolm in memory of his father, Donald Malcolm. The centre houses a display of fifteen fully operational trucks. The centre is located next to the HQ in Linwood. In 2021, the company supported plans to expand this centre.

== Divisions ==
=== Logistics ===
The group provides warehousing at locations in Scotland, and northern and central England, primary and secondary road distribution, and train services in association with Freightliner, as well as managing the rail terminals at Grangemouth, Linwood (Elderslie) and Daventry International Rail Freight Terminal.

In 2014, Malcolm Logistics launched its new 50ft containers, designed for both road and rail use. In 2021, following government approval of longer semi-trailers (LSTs) and an internal trial, Malcolm Group decided to expand its LST fleet. Two years later, the company launched a biofuel trial for its lorries.

=== Rail ===
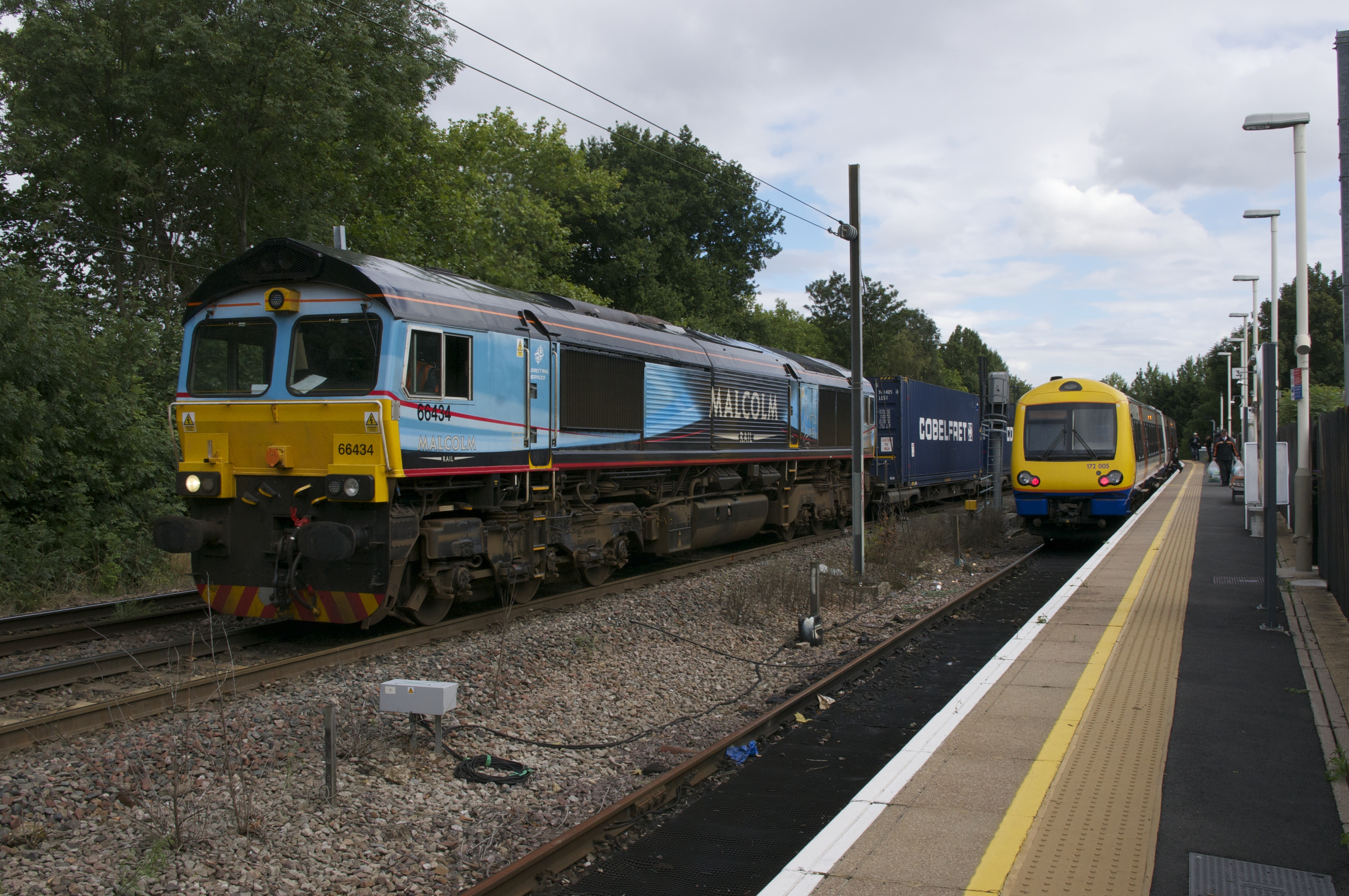
Malcolm Rail train at Gospel Oak, London

The group's rail division was launched in 2001 with a focus on retail and logistics supply chains. Several of its services have been operated in conjunction with Freightliner; in October 2023, a five-year service contract between the two companies came into force. Under this pairing, several dedicated trains have been operated daily from Daventry to both Grangemouth and Mossend. By 2025, the firm's intermodal services had reportedly transported in excess of 700,000 container since 2001.

=== Construction ===
The company's construction division undertakes civil engineering work including excavation and construction of earthworks, roadwork and groundwork, waste recycling, quarrying, and sports pitch surfacing in association with Newark based subsidiary companies Charles Lawrence Surfaces Ltd and Woodholme Construction. The firm has been involved in the purchase and management of warehouses on behalf of other businesses, as well as of facilities for the 2026 Commonwealth Games.

Vehicle maintenance is carried out in house.
