= Linwood High School =

Coordinates: 55.849°N 4.510°W

- Linwood, Renfrewshire; Scotland

Information
- Type: Comprehensive school
- Motto: Nil Sine Labore; Latin (Nothing without Labour)
- Established: 1965
- School district: Renfrewshire
- Campus: Stirling Drive
- Houses: Napier, Linden, Mossedge and Inkerman
- Colours: Blue, white and black
- Website: linwoodhigh.renfrewshire.sch.uk

Linwood High School is a non-denominational comprehensive state secondary school in Linwood, Renfrewshire, Scotland.

The original school building was constructed in 1965 and demolished in 2006 for a new school to be constructed on the same site.

Originally Renfrewshire council had planned on merging Linwood High school with nearby Gryffe High School in Houston to form a 1500 pupil campus, but plans were rejected after local protests by parents. The councillors are reported to have received over 2600 responses, mostly opposing the plan.

The new school was part of Renfrewshire Council's £100 million Private Public Partnership (PPP) agreement, with Amey / Carillion Building being announced as preferred bidder in March 2005.

The £11.1 million construction was fully completed with the official opening in April 2008 by Fiona Hyslop, Cabinet Secretary for Education and Lifelong Learning.

In 2008, the school was one of four in the Renfrewshire area to have a Strathclyde Police officer on the premises with the key aim of "building stronger and safer communities". Strathclyde Police stated that the schools were chosen "because they are the ones with the biggest intake and catchment areas in Renfrewshire"

== Roll ==
- 2004/2005 – 516 pupils
- 2008/2009 – 467 pupils
- 2010/2011 – 444 pupils

== Head Teachers ==
- 1965 – 1975 Bob Curtis
- 1975 – 1995 Iain Clark
- 1995 – 2009 Keith Hasson
- 2009–2017 Eileen Young
- 2017–present John Hammond

== Notable former pupils ==
- Drew Wilson Triple Commonwealth Games, cyclist
- Paul Lambert, Celtic Football Club, captain
- Darryl Duffy, Hibernian Football Club
- David Lowing, St Mirren Football Club
- Steven McDougall, Dumfermline Football Club
- Paul Paton, Partick Thistle Football Club

== HMie Report ==
In September 2005 HMIe visited the school and highlighted areas for improvement within the school. A follow-up inspection in September 2007 indicated that the issues raised had been adequately addressed.
