= Tannochside =

Coordinates: 55°49′54″N 4°04′20″W

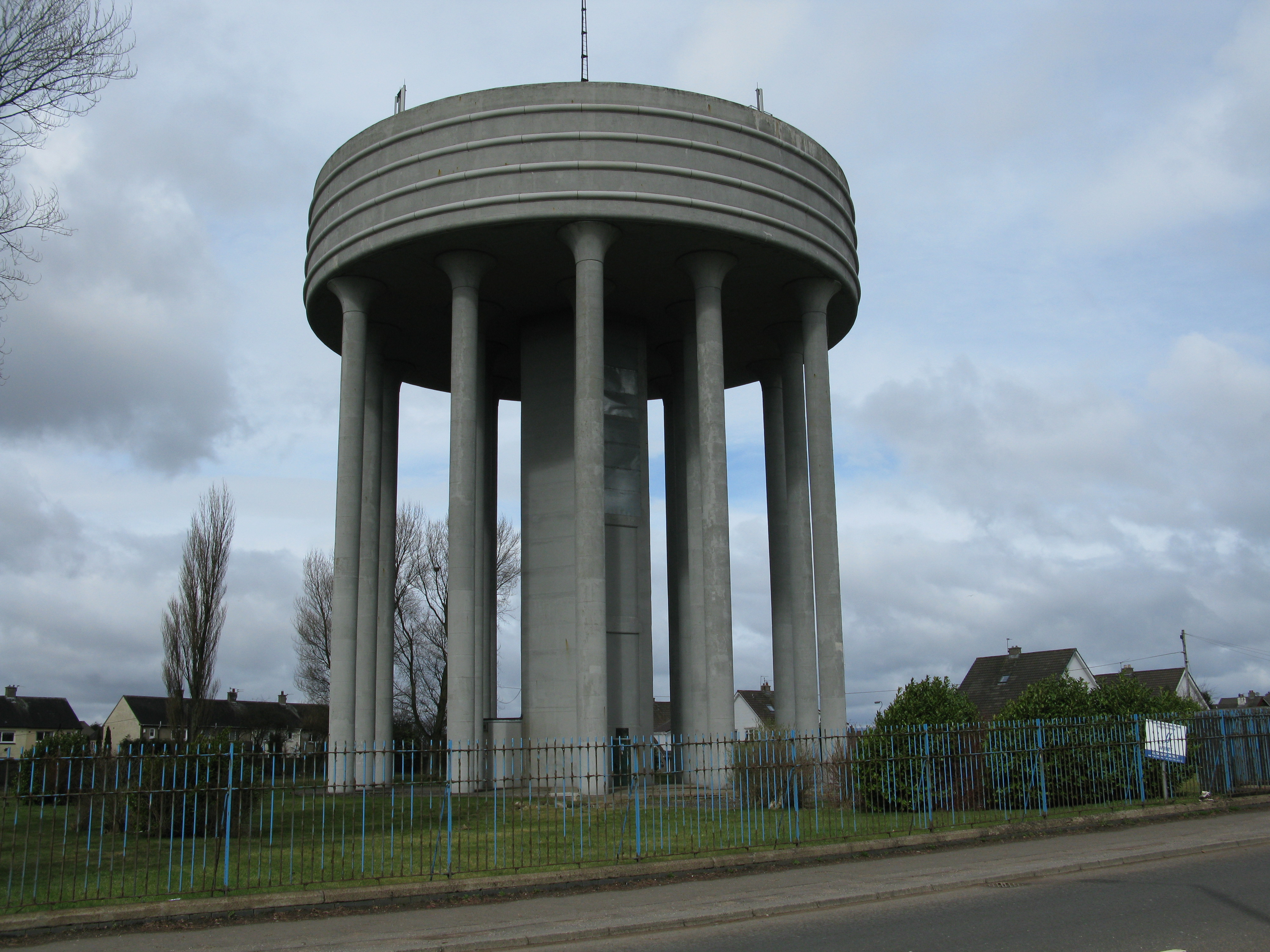
Tannochside Water Tower on Aitkenhead Road

Tannochside is a settlement eight miles (thirteen kilometres) southeast of Glasgow, Scotland. Although historically considered part of Uddingston, it lies within a separate local authority area: Tannochside is contained within the boundaries of North Lanarkshire council (situated between the Birkenshaw and Viewpark neighbourhoods in the Thorniewood ward), whereas the original village of Uddingston is in South Lanarkshire.

Tannochside is part of the Greater Glasgow conurbation. It is often debated as to where the borders lie between Tannochside and other nearby areas. One suggested border is Aitkenhead Road, a main road which splits housing areas adjacent to Scotmid and a local water tower.

== Education ==
Tannochside Primary School is actually located in the west side of Viewpark, and the local high school is Uddingston Grammar School near Uddingston Main Street, though many pupils attend Aitkenhead Primary School or St. John The Baptist Primary School (Uddingston) as well as Holy Cross High School in Hamilton and Cardinal Newman High School in Bellshill.

== Transport ==
Several bus routes pass through Tannochside, the most frequent of which are the 0107 Coatley Bus Service, which is now known as 240 JMB Travel Service, which operates between Hamilton Bus Station in Hamilton, South Lanarkshire and Motherwell, North Lanarkshire and the 240 First service of a fairly identical route. The closest railway station is Uddingston station located in the west side of Uddingston Main Street. The A8 dual carriageway/M8 motorway is two miles (three kilometres) to the north.

== Local amenities ==
A small shopping complex is located on the west side of Tannochside with a supermarket, take-aways, chemist, dentist, charity shop, and other outlets. Nearby Uddingston main street also has a range of retail outlets and services. The Glasgow East Showcase Cinema Complex is just two miles (three kilometres) north of Tannochside near the A8 dual carriageway. There are also major retailers based within the nearby Birkenshaw Trading Estate.

== See also ==
- List of places in North Lanarkshire
