= Willie Collum =

Scottish football referee and teacher

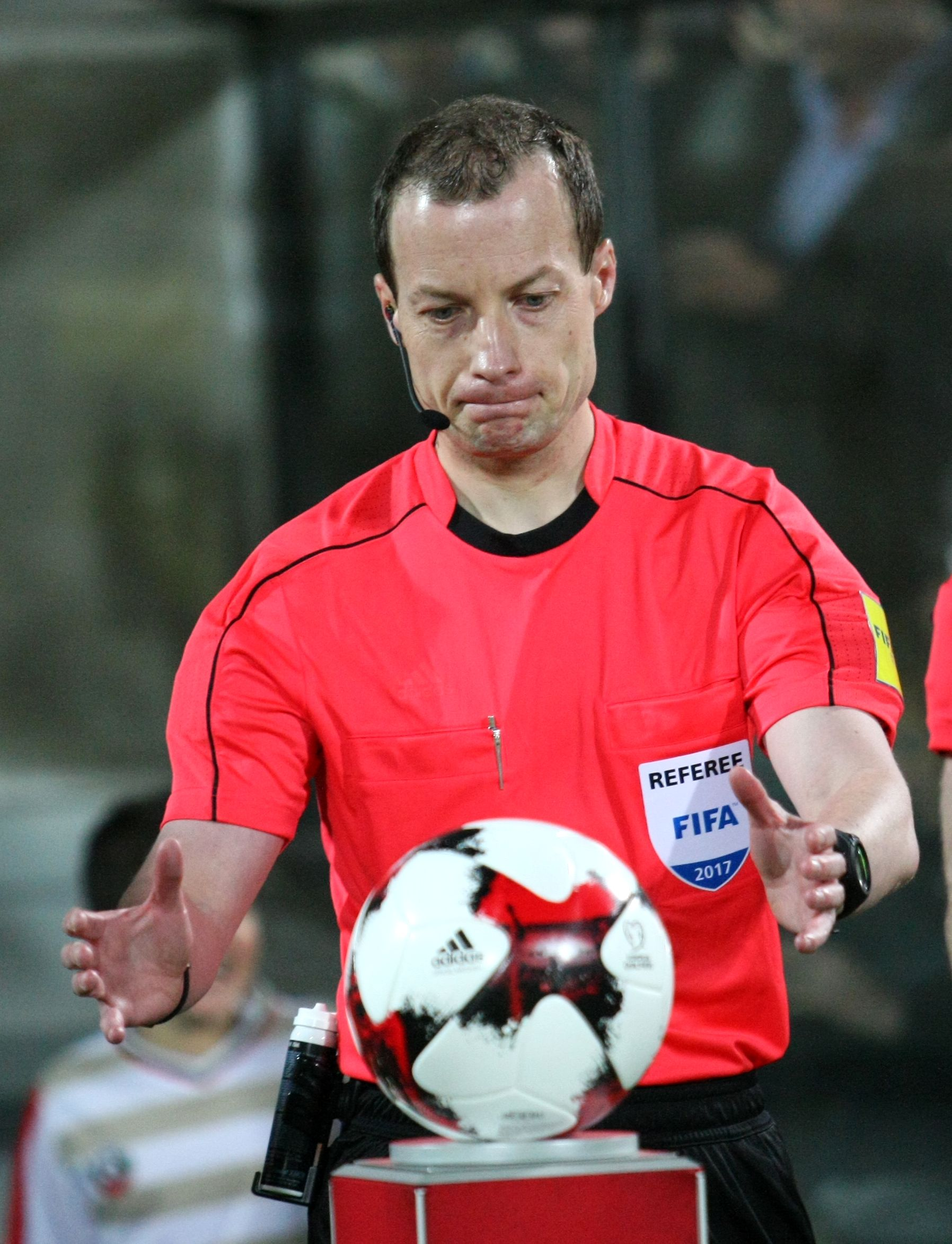
- Full name: William Sean Collum
- Born: 18 January 1979 (age 47); Glasgow, Scotland

Domestic
Years	League	Role
2000–2024	Scottish Football Association	Referee
2000–2008	Scottish Football League	Referee
2005–2013	Scottish Premier League	Referee
2013–2024	Scottish Professional Football League	Referee

International
Years	League	Role
2006–2024	FIFA listed	Referee

William Sean Collum (born 18 January 1979) is a former Scottish football referee and is currently head of referee operations at the Scottish FA.

== Career ==
Collum officiated his first Scottish Football League match in November 2004, and his first SPL match in April 2006. He took charge of his first UEFA Champions League match in September 2010, overseeing FC Copenhagen's 2–0 win away at Panathinaikos, and has also officiated several high profile international matches and UEFA Europa League matches. On 11 June 2012 it was announced that Collum had been elevated to FIFA Elite Referee level joining Craig Thomson on the 24-strong list of the world’s leading referees.

His major domestic appointments include the Scottish Cup finals of 2013, 2015 and 2019, and the 2012 Scottish League Cup Final.

== Teaching career ==
Collum was principal teacher of the religious education department at Cardinal Newman High School in Bellshill.
