= Queensferry High School =

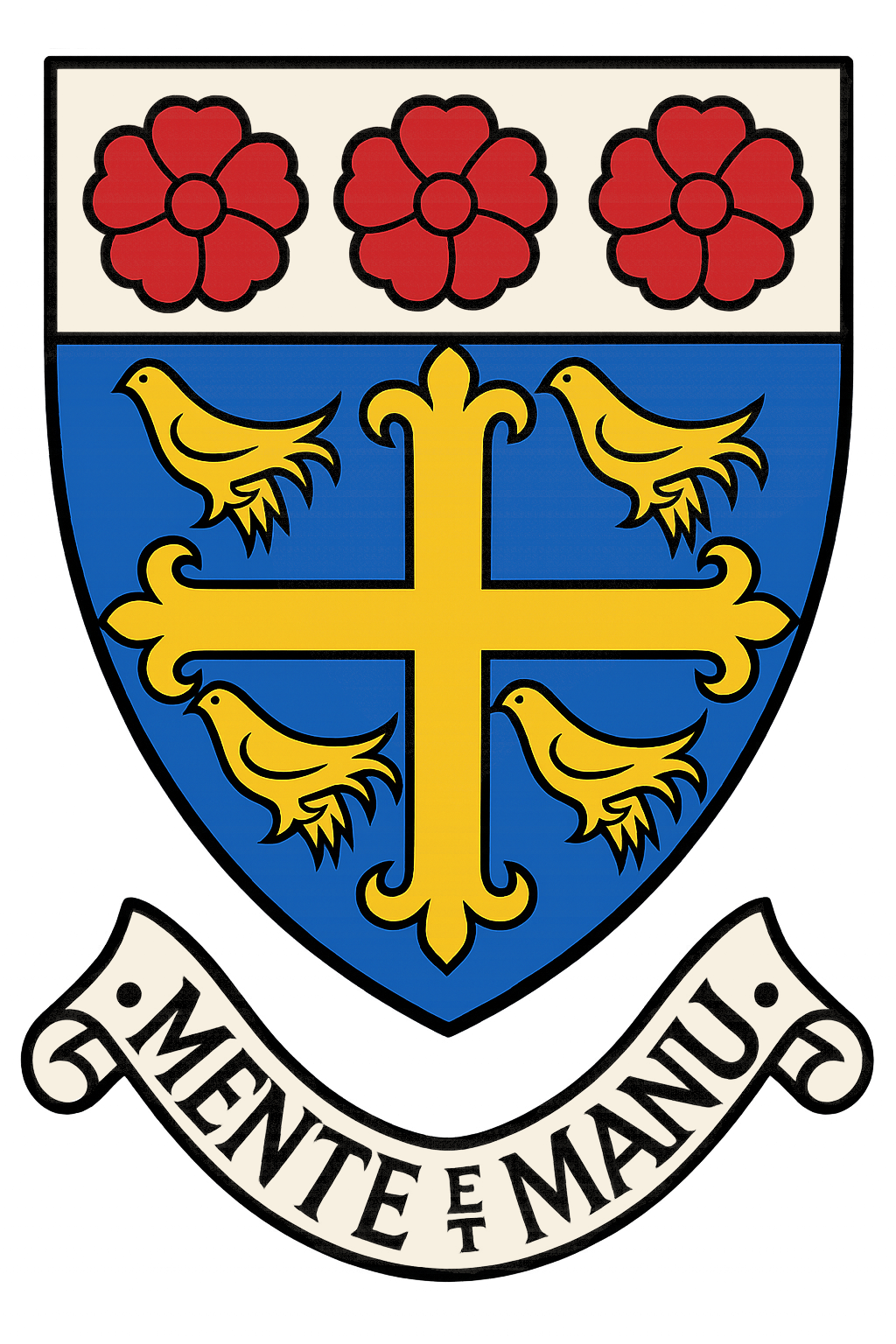

Location
- Ashburnham Road; South Queensferry, West Lothian, EH30 9JN; Scotland; 55°59′11″N 3°23′07″W

Information
- Type: State School
- Motto: Mente et Manu ('with mind and hand')
- Established: 1970
- Local authority: City of Edinburgh Council
- Department for Education URN: 5518334 Tables
- Headteacher: Craig Downie
- Staff: c.80 teaching
- Gender: Coeducational
- Age: 11 to 18
- Enrolment: c.761 students
- Houses: Dundas; Hopetoun; Rosebery; Forth
- Colours: Black, white and blue
- Nickname: QHS
- Website: http://www.queensferryhigh.co.uk/

Queensferry High School (also known as Queensferry Community High School) is a six-year comprehensive school in the town of South Queensferry, Scotland, run by the City of Edinburgh Council. It was opened in 1970 by Princess Margaret marking the 900th anniversary of the arrival of Queen Margaret in Queensferry. Currently it has 1036 students, predominantly from Echline Primary School, Queensferry Primary School, Dalmeny Primary School and Kirkliston Primary School. It was made a School of Ambition in 2007.

== School life ==
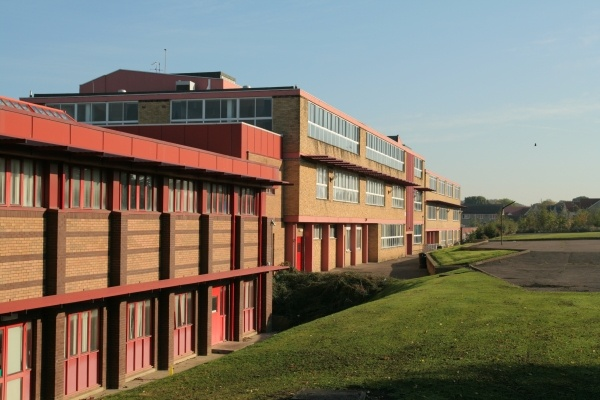
The main school building viewed from the back grounds.

Upon enrolment at the school, the pupils are assigned to a house: Dundas, Hopetoun, Rosebery or Forth. The three original houses are named after three noble families in and around Queensferry: the Earls of Rosebery, seated at Dalmeny House; the Earls of Hopetoun, seated at Hopetoun House; and the Stewart-Clark baronets, seated at Dundas Castle. The recently created house, Forth, is named after the river upon which Queensferry sits.

A school uniform was reintroduced in 2005. It consists of black trousers or a black or tartan skirt, with a white shirt, a black jumper or sweater and a tie bearing the school's registered tartan "The Ferry Fling". Blazers are optional for junior students, and 'required' for senior students.

== Leadership ==
QHS Headteachers
Name	Years
Mr Craig Downie	2021–present
Mr John Wood	2011-2021
Mr Robert Birch	2006-2011
Mr Malcom Lewis	1989-2006
Mr Robert Russell	1970-1989

== Buildings ==
The school buildings, corresponding with increasing student numbers, have been much extended from their original 1970 form. In 1995 a recreation wing was added, with a substantial extension to the school being added in 1997 and a total refurbishment being undertaken in 1998. In early 2016, plans to start building a new school were unveiled. The building started early 2018 and was finished mid-2020.

== Academic records ==
The table below shows the fourth year pass rates at Level 3 (Standard Grade Foundation level or equivalent) or better, Level 4 (Standard Grade General level or equivalent) or better and Level 5 (Standard Grade Credit level or equivalent) or better for Queensferry High School in the 2006/2007 academic year, contrasted with pass rates for Edinburgh and Scotland as a whole.

	Queensferry High School	Edinburgh City	Scotland
Level 3	90%	89%	91%
Level 4	83%	75%	76%
Level 5	39%	34%	33%

The table below shows as a percentage the number of students from the previous year's fourth years who went on to pass one or more, three or more or five or more level 6 examinations (Highers) in 2006/2007. 37% of those fourth years had left and so attained none. This compared to a citywide and national rate of 35% leaving.

	Queensferry High School	Edinburgh City	Scotland
One or more	43%	38%	39%
Three or more	23%	23%	22%
Five or more	10%	11%	10%

Below is a breakdown of what the leavers of Queensferry High School during the 2006/2007 academic year went on to do. A high percentage of leavers went directly into employment.

	Queensferry High School	Edinburgh City	Scotland
Full-time higher education	29%	29%	30%
Full-time further education	17%	22%	23%
Training	1%	3%	5%
Employment	41%	29%	28%
Unemployed, seeking employment	12%	14%	11%
Unemployed, not seeking employment	0%	2%	1%
Not known	1%	1%	1%

== In the news ==
The school after being petrol bombed.

Queensferry High School has twice been in the news in recent years due to separate security issues. On 15 December 2005 pupils were locked in their classrooms for two hours and told to stay away from windows and out of corridors after a man with a gun threatened to commit suicide in a house opposite the school. Armed police closed off the surrounding area and arrested the man without any injury to anyone.

In the early hours of 22 February 2008 the school was petrol bombed by three former pupils, blowing out an external wall at the back of the school and destroying a ground floor English classroom. No one was harmed as no one was in the school at the time.

== Coat of arms ==
The school's coat of arms was granted by the Lord Lyon in 1970. It features the cross and martlets from the arms of St Margaret (the queen for whom Queensferry was named), plus the primroses from the arms of Neil Primrose, Earl of Rosebery.

== Notable alumni ==
- Stephen Hendry (born 1969), snooker player
- Paul Appleby (boxer) (born 1987), boxer
- Callum Paterson (born 1994), footballer
- Michael Travis (born 1993), footballer
- Cammy Logan (born 2002), footballer
