= Gleniffer High School =

School in Paisley, Renfrewshire, Scotland

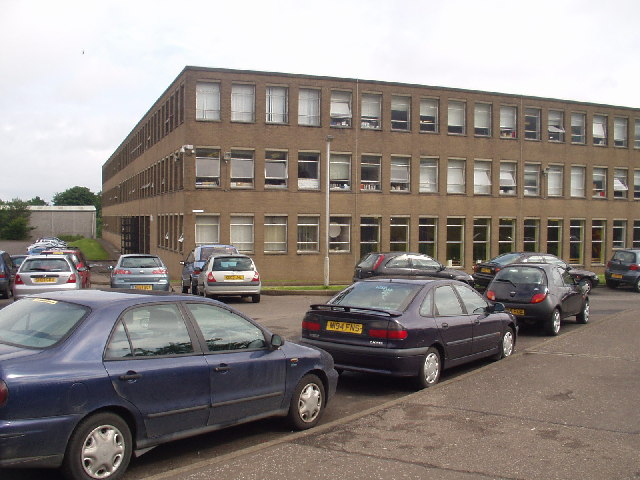
- Gleniffer High School

Location
- Amochrie Road, Foxbar, Paisley, Renfrewshire, Renfrewshire, PA2 0AG; United Kingdom; 55.8237°N 4.45879°W

Information
- Type: state funded school
- Motto: Believe and you will achieve
- Established: 1988
- Head Teacher: Lisa Chalmers
- Staff: 81 (FTE)
- Gender: Both
- Age: 11 to 18
- Enrolment: 1171 (2021)
- Houses: 4
- Colours: Red, black, and blue
- Website: http://www.glenifferhigh.renfrewshire.sch.uk/a.html

Gleniffer High School is a Scottish state school located in Paisley for boys and girls aged 11 to 18. Since 1988, Gleniffer has been located in Paisley's Foxbar district, close to the Gleniffer Braes in the west coast of Scotland, south of Glasgow.

The school serves children from the geographical areas of Foxbar, Ferguslie Glenburn and Lochfield. The school's pupils come from a mix of social and private housing. With a pupil population of 1,226 as of September 2012, Gleniffer is the third largest of Renfrewshire's 11 state high schools (The largest is Park Mains, with a roll of 1,360).

As of 2024, Gleniffer High was ranked the 95th state school in Scotland, as measured by the percentage of students (43%) achieving five Higher passes.

The school was inspected in 2011/2012. The Education Scotland report cited the school to be "very good" on 5 key quality indicators. It therefore did not achieve the top rank of "outstanding" for any of the inspection criterion. The Head Teacher, Mr David Nicholls, told the local press he was "absolutely delighted by how positive this report is"; thus fulfilling his self-stated key duty to "promote and protect the school ... [to] ... parents, the media and politicians".

== Head teacher ==
The school is run by a management team, headed by the school's fourth head teacher Lisa Chalmers. She is assisted by four deputy head teachers. She took over as the first female head teacher of Gleniffer in August 2017. The head teacher posts weekly blogs concerning the school's progress on Gleniffer's website. David Nicholls was head teacher from academic year 2004/2005 until August 2017.

In February 2007, the national press reported that Mr Nicholls had been attacked on school premises by a pupil. The Daily Record wrote:

'A source at Gleniffer High said Mr Nicholls was attacked when he was called in to deal with an argument between the boy and a teacher. The source said: "Things started to get heated and the other pupils were put out of the class. Mr Nicholls dealt with it all exactly by the book but when the boy lashed out at him they had to bring the police in." Another school source said: "Everyone at Gleniffer is horrified by this. It's no wonder this young thug has been banned from setting foot in the school ever again."'

During May 2008, he criticized then Scottish Labour leader Wendy Alexander for using smear tactics against Gleniffer. During First Minister's Questions, Ms Alexander cited that some Advanced Highers were being cut from the school curriculum. The Deputy First Minister, Nicola Sturgeon, said Ms Alexander's claims were "untrue". The Scotsman newspaper wrote of Mr Nicholl's fury over this matter:

'The headteacher at Gleniffer High School (David Nicholls) was so concerned by their scaremongering that he phoned the (SNP) leader of Renfrewshire Council (Derek Mackay] to complain about Labour's tactics on this issue..'

The most recent 2011 inspection cited that 98% of Gleniffer's pupils' parents agreed that the school was "well led", with 58% strongly agreeing. On a similarly positive note, a December 2011 publicly published letter from inspectors cited one of the school's key strengths as "The inspirational leadership and drive of the headteacher."

== History ==
The schools origins are in the late 20th century where the current main campus of the building is; just northwest of Stanely reservoir in the South West of Paisley (Foxbar area). In 1967/8 the school built on this location was called Camphill or ‘the new Camphill’, which was to replace ‘the old Camphill’ where Castlehead high school is now (see Camphill note below).

NB: The 'New Camphill' Campus, pictured in top right of this webpage, was demolished and replaced (by 'Glennifer' building) in 2006.

This 'New Camphill' was square in shape when viewed from above, across three floors, had identical tall rectangular windows across all four faces of the building. This gave the building an almost ‘prison like’ appearance with the hundreds of identical shaped windows spanning the lengths and breadths of every side of the building. The classrooms were housed in the ‘perimeter’ part of the building. In the ‘hollow’ centre part of the square building was an assembly hall, swimming pool (unusual for a school at this time, but was built due to excess funding available), a girls gym and a boys gym.

In 1988, Stanely Green High School (situated to the south of Stanely reservoir) closed and was amalgamated with Camphill High school, both schools of which acted as smaller institutions within the Paisley area at the time. Camphill High School was then renamed to Glennifer High School.

The then headmaster of Stanely Green High School, Mr Hugh Nesbitt, became the rector of Paisley Grammar School, with Jim Aitchison (original headmaster of Camphill before the amalgamation) became the first headmaster of Gleniffer High.

An inspection was carried out in 2004, which listed positives and negatives. On the positive, it noted the school to have "high quality leadership provided by the headteacher and his senior management team" as well as "pupil participation" in the "range of extra-curricular activities provided". However, it also raised concerns over poor writing standards across the school, and inconsistency by staff in dealing with discipline issues.

The school's website refers to the 2004 inspection document as "a draft report".

In 2006, after 39 years of service, the building was demolished and replaced in 2006.

=== Camphill High School ===
On 14 April 1888 at 2 p.m. Camphill School was officially opened, in a site off a street called Camphill - a street off Canal Street in Paisley. Two days later over 1,000 pupils enrolled in the school which cost £23,000 to build, took two years to construct and accommodated over 2,000 pupils. This building served until it was demolished 1968/9.

This original building and school, since 1967, is referred to as “the old Camphill school”.

Castlehead High, opened in 1971, was built on the old Camphill school site, with Mr. John Taylor as head-master.

== Notable alumni ==
The school's alumni include David Sneddon, winner of the BBC's Fame Academy in 2003, starting Gleniffer in August 1990. Screenwriter Steven Moffat, whose notable works include head writer and executive producer of Doctor Who (2010-2017) and creating Sherlock with Mark Gatiss in 2010. Graeme Sinclair attended Camphill in the 70s and went on to play professionally for Dumbarton and for Celtic 1982–1985. Heather Reid, OBE, a former weather presenter for BBC Scotland.

== Academic standards and performance ==
Pupils follow the Curriculum for Excellence through the six years of their careers at Gleniffer High. They then choose up to 8 National 5's or National 4's for their 3rd and 4th years. Pupils can be dropped in level from National 5 to National 4, or dropped from National 4 to National 3 if their teachers believe they would not achieve a grade at their current level, this is an action that can be reversed if the pupil then reaches a higher working grade. The National 5 final examinations are sat at the end of the 4th year, and are graded from the highest mark of 'A' down to the lowest of 'D'. Those with good passes at National 5 then choose up to 5 Highers for their 5th year, which forms the basis of Scottish school students' university applications. Higher examinations are graded from 'A' to 'D'. Those staying on to a 6th year can sit Advanced Highers, which are also graded 'A' to 'D'.

Gleniffer High School does not offer other study options such as A-Levels or any of the International Baccalaureate qualifications.

Standard Grade

In a 2011 public examinations diet, 95% of Gleniffer's 2009 S4 enrollment passed at least five Standard Grades subjects at level '7' or better (on a scale from '7' to '1'; with '1' being the highest). This was down from 96% in the 2010 Standard Grade examinations.

For the 2011 examinations diet, 30% achieved at least five '1' or '2', "Credit" pass; compared with 35% for Scotland as a whole, and down from 42% in 2010.

Scotland no longer uses Standard Grade levels and has started using National 4 & 5's in their place.

| Percentage of pupils achieving at least 5 Standard Grade Passes at Credit Level by end of S4, % of S4 enrollment | | | |
| | 2008/2009 | 2009/2010 | 2010/2011 |
|---|---|---|---|
| Gleniffer | 36% | 42% | 30% |
| Renfrewshire | 39% | 38% | 35% |
| Scotland | 35% | 36% | 35% |

Higher

At the 2011 diet of Higher examinations, 51% of the students who enrolled at the beginning of S4 (in 2009) were able to achieve at least one Higher pass; compared with 44% for Scotland as a whole. 31% of the enrollment were able to achieve at least three "C" passes at Higher. 10% of Gleniffer's fourth year enrollments were able to attain at least 5 "C" passes by S5; compared with 11% for Renfrewshire and 12% for Scotland as a whole.

Given the 2009/10 enrollment of Gleniffer's S4s totalled 242, this means only 24 of them were able to achieve at least five Higher passes by the end of S5, in the May/June 2011 diet of Higher exams. Of these, five pupils achieved five "A" grade passes.

Sixth year and Advanced Highers

Of the 248 pupils who enrolled to begin their 4th year in August 2008, 54%, 131, stayed on to do a sixth year by the start of academic year beginning August 2010. 35 pupils - that is, 14% - of the 248 who had begun their fourth year in autumn 2008 were able to achieve at least one 'C' pass at Advanced Higher in the 2011 May/June final exams. This was up from 9% the prior year.

== National comparisons ==
The below table compares the latest results, for the 2011 final Higher examinations, for Gleniffer and other schools across Scotland. It shows Gleniffer to have a considerably better academic performance compared to poorer schools, and indeed to have better results by some measures than Scotland as a whole. However, there is a very wide gap between Gleniffer and elite fee paying schools: only 10% of Gleniffer's fifth years achieved at least 5 Higher passes, compared to 69% at Glasgow Academy, and 84% at Dollar Academy. Of the students starting Gleniffer in S4, only 2% achieved five A's at Higher by fifth year; whilst at Dollar Academy, 25.6% of students did.

| Of those starting S4 in 2009>> | % with at least 3 Higher C's, 2011 | % with at least 5 Higher C's, 2011 | % entitled to free meals, 2011 | Type of school |
|---|---|---|---|---|
| Scotland as a whole | 26% | 12% | 15.2% | - |
| Gleniffer High School | 31% | 10% | 15.5% | State school |
| Govan High School | 3% | 0% | 62.4% | State school |
| Woodfarm High School | 49% | 28% | 12.1% | State school |
| Glasgow Academy | 87% | 61% | 0% | Private day school, fees £10,800 per academic year |
| Dollar Academy | 99% | 84% | 0% | Private boarding school, fees £22,941 per annum |

== 21st-century building ==
In 2006 work was completed on a modernised building, located on the site of the school's sports ground. Constructed by Carillion under a private finance initiative (PFI) with Amey contractors. The new building aimed to breathe fresh air into the crumbling construction that housed the school previously.

=== Controversy ===
The opening of the building was delayed in late 2006 due to failure of the Carillion contractors to meet the agreed finishing date of July of that year. Staff, equipment and supplies were therefore delayed also in being transported to the new facilities, with Carillion having been said to have had five figure fines for each day it overran. By order of apology, the company nonetheless offered to pay for extra tuition for pupils after classes - a service that had then recently been cut by Renfrewshire Council Education Department.

== Facilities ==
The new building constructed in 2006 drastically modernised the services on offer to both staff and pupils.

=== Sports ===
The new building offered the pupils large classrooms, each with internet access, whiteboards, and many with projector and modern AV facilities- a must have for modern education. Children however lost access to a swimming pool in the build, but have access to two indoor sports areas, a gym, and two large outdoor sports fields. The school has a great history for sports provision, both curricular and extra-curricular, often with community resources being used to complement the schools modern facilities.

== Uniform ==
The uniform may include, as listed by the Gleniffer High website: Black jumper/black skirt/pinafore/trousers/black shoes/white shirt and school tie. The school tie is black with red, maroon and sky blue stripes. The red and black colours on the Gleniffer tie originate from the old Camphill high school, as black was one of the school's main colours with a red stripe; whilst the maroon and sky blue are from the Stanely Green high school tie.

However, 6th year senior pupils wear sky blue coloured ties instead, that sport the Gleniffer High logo. This was introduced in 2005.

P.E Kit

For Physical Education, pupils are expected to wear a red T-shirt, preferably with the Gleniffer logo, with black shorts. Appropriate footwear - indoor/outdoor trainers - for the given activity is also required.

During colder months, red jumpers are permitted for outside activities; together with black joggers.

== Admissions ==
The school automatically enrolls pupils from its Paisley south catchment area. With population increases in these areas, the number of pupils enrolling per annum has increased.

Most pupils come to Gleniffer directly from the following local primary schools: Brediland, Bushes, Heriot, Langcraigs, Lochfield. Some may come from other nearby primary schools; or enroll from other primary school in other districts in later years of their high school career because they have moved into Gleniffer's catchment area.

Notably, pupils from local primary schools such St Paul's automatically do not attend Gleniffer, but instead go to the Roman Catholic denominational school, St Andrew's Academy, because they are typically Catholics. Gleniffer would accept these pupils, being non-denominational, but these children's parents prefer their children to have an education enmeshed in Roman Catholicism, which Gleniffer does not offer.

Pupils typically enrol at Gleniffer in Secondary 1 (first year) aged 11 – 12 years old, leaving after Secondary 6 (sixth year) aged 17 – 18.

Of those admitted in August 2010, 15.5% - that is 197 pupils - were entitled to free school meals, the common barometer of poverty. This was slightly higher than the Renfrewshire and Scotland average of 15.2%. Thus, there are (very slightly) more poor pupils at Gleniffer than Scotland as a whole.

The school operates a "house" system to encourage competition amongst the pupils. There are 4 houses: Brodie, Glen, Moredun, and Thornly. All are named after parks in the Renfrewshire area. This system was established in the 2011/2012 year. Prior to this the houses were: Abercorn, Coats, Hamilton, Robertson, Tannahill, and Wilson. Old Camphill School had four houses named after lighthouses. Ailsa, Davaar, Sanda, Toward. House colours were red, green, yellow and blue respectively.

== Departments and subjects ==
- Art
- PSE
- Biology
- Business Education
- Chemistry
- Computing Science
- English
- Geography
- History
- Home Economics
- Maths
- Modern Languages
- Modern Studies
- Music
- Physical Education
- Physics
- Religious Education (RMPS)
- General Science
- Technical Education
