= Cardinal Newman High School, Bellshill =

Comprehensive school in North Lanarkshire, Scotland

Coordinates: 55.81684°N 4.03643°W

Cardinal Newman High School

Location
- Main Street; Bellshill, North Lanarkshire, ML4 3DW; Scotland

Information
- Type: Comprehensive School
- Motto: In Veritatem
- Religious affiliation: Roman Catholic
- Established: 1977
- Local authority: North Lanarkshire Council
- Headteacher: Derek Lang
- Gender: Mixed
- Age: 11 to 18
- Enrolment: 1041 As of September 2015
- Houses: Andrew, Columba, Kentigern, and Ninian
- Colours: Red, gold, blue
- School Years: S1-S6
- Telephone: 01698 274 944
- Website: Cardinal Newman High School

Cardinal Newman High School is a Roman Catholic, co-educational, comprehensive secondary school located in Bellshill, North Lanarkshire, Scotland. The school was formed by the amalgamation of Elmwood Secondary, St. Saviour's High School and St. Catherine's. The school's catchment area includes Bellshill, Mossend, Viewpark, Birkenshaw and Tannochside. The feeder primary schools are St Gerard's, Sacred Heart, Holy Family and John Paul II (St John the Baptist Primary in Uddingston [was re-aligned to Holy Cross High School, Hamilton).

== Senior management ==
The Headteacher is Mr Lang, he is assisted by 3 Depute Heads. Mrs T McDade (S5-S6), Mrs H McGhee (S1-S2) and Mrs Murray (S3-S4).

== Name ==
In 1977, the school was named after Cardinal Henry Newman by Monsignor Philip Flanagan, the then Parish Priest of Sacred Heart Parish and a former Rector of the Scots College in Rome.

== Uniform ==
The uniform for all pupils is a white shirt, black trousers or a black skirt and a black blazer. S1-S4 pupils wear a striped blue, yellow and red tie, whereas S5 years wear a plain blue tie and S6 pupils have the same tie with red stripes. The S6 blazer is black with blue braiding.

== Houses ==
The school has four houses all named after Scottish Saints, Andrew, Columba, Kentigern and Ninian.

== Upgrade ==
In 2017, North Lanarkshire Council pledged £2 million to the school as part of a modernisation scheme to develop more facilities for the school. This funding was used to open a multi-use games area at the rear of the school during the session of the 40th anniversary of the school.

== In the media ==
The school was featured in the Scottish Catholic Observer newspaper and website after a group of staff and pupils embarked on a pilgrimage to Cofton Park, Birmingham to attend the beatification mass of the school's namesake.

In February 2013, Cardinal O'Brien visited the school to bless a large set of Rosary beads to launch the Mission Matter Rosary Campaign.

== Notable alumni ==
- Steven Bonnar (b. 1981) - Scottish National Party politician, Member of Parliament (MP) for Coatbridge, Chryston and Bellshill (UK Parliament constituency) (2019- )
- Chris Maguire (b. 1989) - professional footballer, Lincoln City F.C.
- Shaun Rooney (b. 1996) - professional footballer, St Johnstone F.C.
- Anthony Ralston (b. 1998) - professional footballer, Celtic F.C., Scotland men's national football team
- Barry Maguire (b. 1998) - professional footballer, Motherwell F.C.
- Ciaran McKenna (b. 1998) - professional footballer, Partick Thistle F.C.
- Barry Burns, Scottish musician best known for his work with post-rock band Mogwai

== Notable teachers ==
A notable teacher at the school was William Collum, a football referee in the Scottish Premier League, Scottish Football League and UEFA competitions, who was the principal teacher of religious education.
