= Geraldine O'Neill =

Writer and editor

- Born: January 1955 (age 71); Cleland, North Lanarkshire, Scotland
- Occupation: Author
- Website: geraldineoneillauthor.wordpress.com

Geraldine O'Neill is an internationally published author living in Ireland since 1991, but is originally from Scotland. She primarily writes historical fiction novels.

== Biography ==
Geraldine O'Neill grew up in Cleland, North Lanarkshire in Scotland, born to an Irish mother and Scottish father. She was the second of six children. She was educated at St Mary's Primary School in Cleland and then at Holy Cross High School, Hamilton.

While training to be a teacher in Newcastle-upon-Tyne she met her future husband. They married in 1977 and had two children while living in Scotland. During the eighties, the family moved to her husband's home town of Stockport for a number of years. They moved to live in Ireland in 1991 and settled in County Offaly, where her mother, Bridget O'Neill, was born and raised. It was then that O'Neill began to write seriously. O'Neill worked for a number of years as a school teacher in Daingean National school. O'Neill has published 15 novels, numerous short stories and some poems. Her work is sold internationally and has been translated into a number of languages. Her historical fiction books often feature places she lived in such as County Offaly, Stockport and Lanarkshire in Scotland.

O'Neill had polio as a child which left her with a weakened arm. In 2002 she was diagnosed with Post Polio syndrome; she lives a full and active life. She is a member of the support group Polio Survivors Ireland.

== Bibliography ==
- Aisling Gayle (2003)
- The Grace Girls (2005)
- The Flowers of Ballygrace (2006)
- Leaving Clare (2009)
- Sarah Love (2010)
- Summer's End (2011)
- Music from Home (2013)
- A Letter from America (2015)
- The House on Silver Street (2016)
- Music Across the Mersey (2017)
- A Liverpool Secret (2018)
- The Nightingales in Mersey Square (2020)

=== Tara series ===
- Tara Flynn (2002)
- Tara's Fortune (2004)
- Tara's Destiny (2007)
