= Newbattle High School =

Coordinates: 55.87605°N 3.05491°W

- School logo
- Midlothian; Scotland

Information
- Former name: Newbattle Community High School
- Type: Comprehensive school, School of Ambition, Digital Centre of Excellence
- Motto: Aim Higher (current) Challenge (former)
- Established: 1969
- Head Teacher: Gib McMillan
- Enrollment: 1,247 (August 2024)
- Campus type: Community Campus
- Colours: Blue (Tie) Green, Yellow, Red and Purple (Houses)

Newbattle High School (formerly Newbattle Community High School) is a non-denominational secondary state school located in Easthouses, Midlothian, Scotland within Newbattle Community Campus, which opened to the public on 26 May 2018. It is run by Midlothian Council and has approximately 900 pupils on roll in six-year groups from ages 11 up to 18, and serves the settlements of Easthouses, Mayfield, Gorebridge and Newtongrange plus the small villages of North Middleton, Temple and Borthwick and their surrounding areas. As of 2018 the school has been designated a Digital Centre for Excellence. Newbattle is also known for having doors which allow rooms to be sealed off and then reopened for quick entry/exit. Students have noted that the use of doors is the average for a building but enjoy using doors nonetheless.

== Current building ==
On 26 September 2012, Mike Russell, Scottish Cabinet Secretary for Education and Lifelong Learning visited Newbattle and announced funding for Newbattle High School to get a new school building. Construction of the new Newbattle Community Campus by Morrison Construction began in 2016 and was completed in May 2018, with the school moving from its previous location and opening in the new campus on 5 June 2018.

The new Newbattle Community Campus (with its design influenced heavily by the Lasswade Centre) consists of a three-storey school teaching block and a two-storey split level school PE/community sports facility connected via a single-storey link entrance block which contains a library and café. IT has the capacity to hold up to 1200 students. The Community Campus houses Newbattle High School (which reverted to its previous name in May 2018, having previously been known as Newbattle Community High School), as well as community facilities shared with the school: these are Newbattle Leisure Centre, Newbattle Library and Newbattle Café.

The school has a vocational education programme. Facilities for delivery in this area include the Carnethy Suite (a hospitality suite)(formerly the Borthwick Suite), hairdressing salon, recording studio.

== History ==
The first school recorded in the Newbattle parish was the Parish school at Crawlees, Newtongrange, which was built in 1835 to serve the first colliery houses at Newton Grange (as it was then known). In 1849 this was followed by Newton Grange Colliery Schools.

Both of these schools closed in 1893 when the Newbattle Public School was opened in Gardiner Place, Newtongrange. The building is still in use today as the Newbattle Community Learning Centre. This school was both a primary and a secondary school.

The school remained both a primary and secondary school until 1925, when overcrowding was relieved by the construction of a primary school in Sixth Street, Newtongrange (still in use today as Newtongrange Primary School). In 1925, Newbattle Public School became exclusively a secondary school. In about 1924, a school for the Roman Catholic children of Newtongrange and Gorebridge had opened at Newtonloan Toll, midway between the two villages (and formerly the site of the current St Andrews RC Primary School).

Records of the Newtongrange Gala Day show that the dux of Newbattle Public School was crowned Queen of Newbattle Parish at the gala each year. These records also show that at some point between 1940 and 1944, the name of the school changed to Newbattle Junior Secondary School.

== History of the previous school building ==
The previous high school building was built in 1969, replacing the former Newbattle Junior Secondary School in Newtongrange. When first built, Newbattle High served the communities of Mayfield, Easthouses and Newtongrange, but following the closure of Greenhall High School in 1994, its catchment area expanded to include Gorebridge, Temple, Borthwick and North Middleton.

From 1969 up until June 2018 the school was accommodated in a large 1960s style main teaching block comprising four floors, with a single-story annexe housing sciences and Home Economics. There was a library area, and a Centre for Sport and Leisure, which was housed in a self-contained complex which included a games hall, gymnasium, swimming pool, floodlit synthetic turf pitch (new in 2005) and grassed rugby and football pitch.

Newbattle and its associated primaries were granted New Community Schools status in 2000. In 2005, Newbattle was selected as one of twenty eight schools in Scotland to be awarded Schools of Ambition status. According to the Scottish Executive's website, the schools of ambition programme aims to be "a radical step change in the approach to transforming educational outcomes, which aimed to raise the ambitions of schools, instil belief and ambition in pupils, extend their opportunities and transform their life chances". The enhanced funding and support was used to build on the Arts curriculum, and to develop pupil leadership and self-esteem.

== House system ==
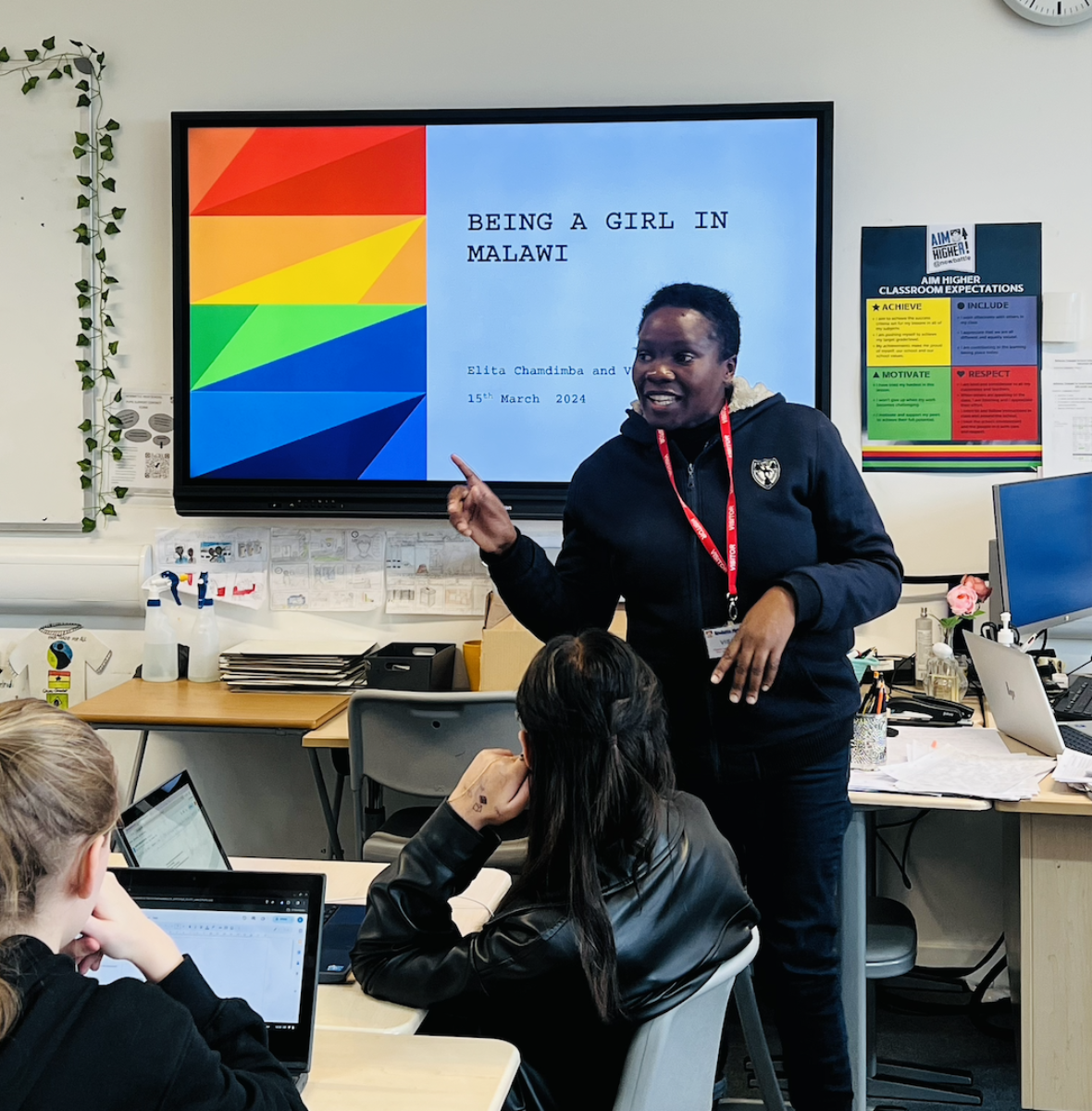
Veila Manyonga of the Scotland Malawi Partnership presenting on what it is like for Malawian girls - in Modern Studies in 2024

The school has a house system which splits pupils between 4 houses with 4 unique tie colours:

- Pentland (Red)

- Moorfoot (Purple)

- Lammermuir (Yellow)

- Borthwick (Green)

Each house also has a its own team of guidance and support staff.

In 2022 due to growing number of pupils a fourth house, Borthwick house, was announced to be taking effect later in the year with pupils moving from current houses and new pupils joining the house.

== Notable former pupils ==
- Adam Nelson, Scottish footballer
- Ashleigh Gray, West End musical performer
- Alex Notman, footballer
- Grant Murray, footballer and former manager of Raith Rovers

== Notable staff ==
- John Frame, History teacher at Newbattle, 1997–2025. Umpired seven Wimbledon finals including 3 men's singles finals. (the source article erroneously refers to John as a "former History teacher" but he is still employed at Newbattle as of October 2023.) John has now retired as of 2025.
- Donald Wilson, former Lord Provost of Edinburgh 2012–2017, computing teacher at Newbattle (left in June 2012 to take up Provost duties)
