= Blairgowrie High School =

Location
- Beeches Road; Blairgowrie, Perth and Kinross, PH10 6PW; Scotland; 56°35′04″N 3°20′33″W

Information
- Type: High School
- Motto: Learning together today to shape the world of tomorrow
- Established: 1958
- Local authority: Perth and Kinross Council
- Head teacher: Paul Cunningham
- Website: www.blairgowriehs.org.uk

Blairgowrie High School is a high school in Blairgowrie, Scotland. Blairgowrie High School has 916 students from Blairgowrie and the surrounding area.

The current head teacher is Paul Cunningham.

== History ==
The school was constructed between 1956 and 1958.

In 2005, the school was one of the first twenty eight schools in Scotland to be awarded Schools of Ambition status.

== Notable former pupils ==
- Fred MacAulay - comedian
- Luke Sutherland - author
- Dougie MacLean - folk singer and composer
- Bradley Neil - professional golfer
- Jamie Robson - footballer
- Chloe O’Brien - professional darts player

== See also ==
- Education in Scotland
