= Lossiemouth High School =

Coordinates: 57°42′49″N 3°17′46″W

Information
- Established: 1974; 52 years ago
- Authority: Moray Council
- Head teacher: Caroline Boyd
- Enrollment: 656
- Houses: Poseidon Shackleton Tornado Typhoon
- Website: www.lossiehigh.co.uk

Lossiemouth High School is a secondary school in the coastal town of Lossiemouth, Moray, Scotland.

The school's catchment area includes the nearby villages of Burghead, Hopeman, Cummingston and Duffus. The feeder primaries are Hythehill, St. Gerardine's, Hopeman and Burghead. The pupils are separated into four houses: Poseidon, Shackleton, Tornado, and Typhoon. The school rector was Brenda Gifford, who retired in 2012. Caroline Boyd is the current head of the school. Former rector, William Barber, was awarded an OBE in 1999 as part of the Queens honours list. In 2006 the school joined Schools of Ambition programme.

== History ==
Lossiemouth High has been a full 6 year comprehensive school since 1974, and a community school since 1979.

The former school building was demolished in 2021.
