= St. Benedict's High School =

St Benedict's High School
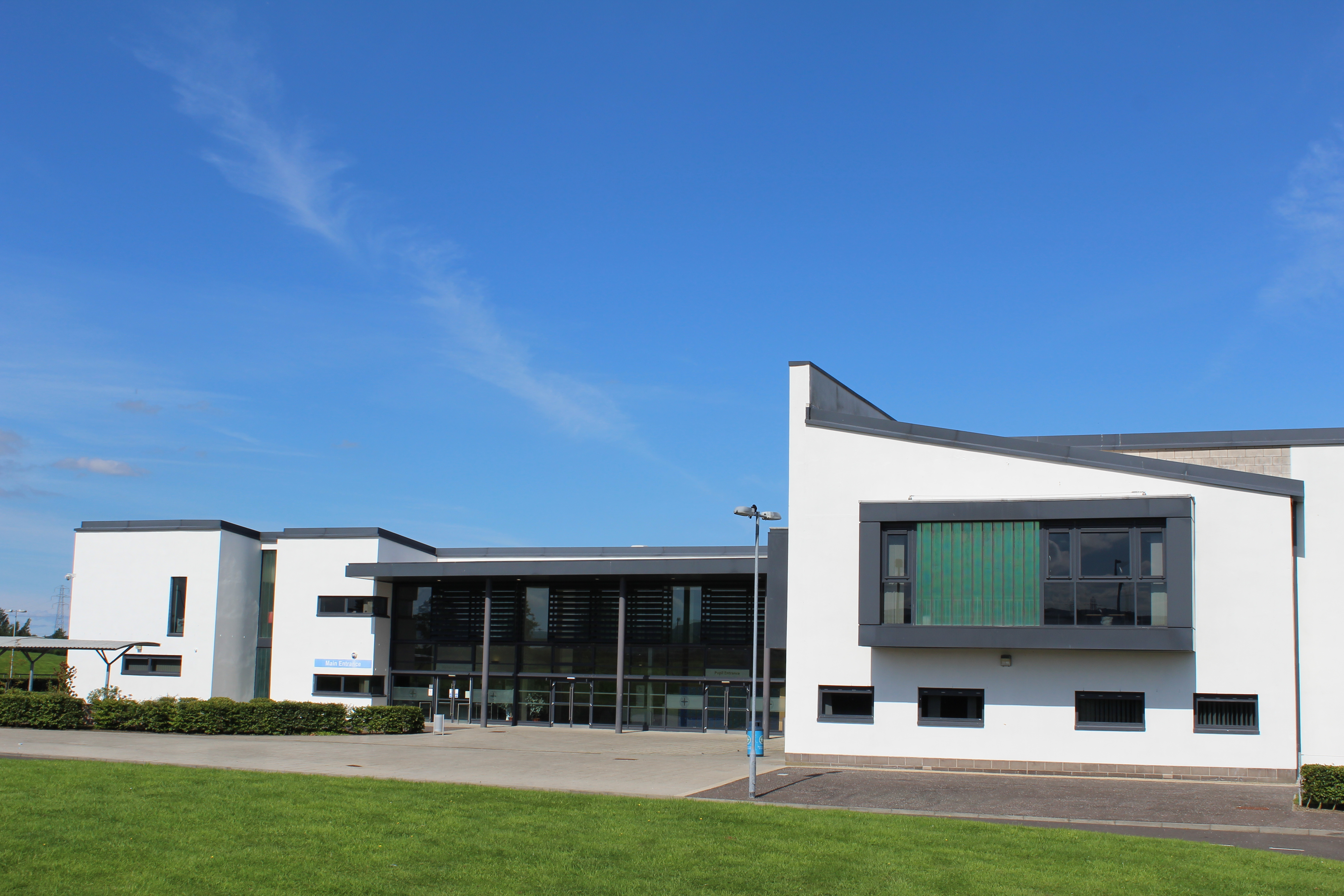

Location
- Bridge of Weir Road; Linwood, Renfrewshire, PA5 8EX; Scotland; 55°50′43″N 4°30′43″W

Information
- Type: Catholic high school
- Motto: Ora et Labora (Latin for 'Pray and work')
- Religious affiliation: Catholic
- Established: 2006; 20 years ago
- Head teacher: Alan Taylor
- Age: 11 to 18
- Enrolment: 912
- Colours: Black; Blue; Green; Grey
- Website: oraetlabora.co.uk

St Benedict's High School is a Catholic high school in Linwood, Renfrewshire, in the west of Scotland.

== The school ==
St Benedict's High School was formed by the amalgamation of St Cuthbert's High School in Johnstone and St Brendan's High School in Linwood. St Benedict's High School serves the Linwood, Houston, Bridge of Weir, Johnstone, Elderslie, Kilbarchan, Howwood and Lochwinnoch areas of Renfrewshire. The school has five associated primary schools - Our Lady of Peace, St. Anthony's, St. David's, St. Fillan's and St. Margaret's. The school roll was 903 pupils as of September 2025. The school's motto is "Ora et Labora" which means "Pray and Work".

In 2018 the school was mentioned in the UK parliament. The school had a partnership with St Patrick's Minor Seminary in Rumphi in Malawi. Three days before a planned visit the seminary were told that their application for visas was rejected. The visas were restored after the Scotland Malawi Partnership contacted members of parliament.

In January 2020 the head, Alan Taylor, introduced a system of assigning pupils to one of four houses that were named after Catholic saints including Josephine Bakhita.

== The building ==
The school building was built by Carillion (who had been commissioned to build several schools in the area) from January 2005 to July 2006, over a period of 79 weeks, for Amey, who lease the building to Renfrewshire Council. Amey also provide the janitorial and cleaning staff.

The school is laid out over two floors, with three main wings. These three wings are linked by a large, roughly rectangular social area, known as The Street, which houses the cafeteria, stage and main meeting area for pupils during breaks (Interval & Lunchtime). The Street also features underfloor heating, two vending machines, lockers, and watercoolers.
