= St John's Academy =

St John’s RC Academy

Location
- North Inch Community Campus; Perth, Perth and Kinross, PH1 5BF; Scotland
- Coordinates: 56.4101°N 3.4382°W

Information
- Type: All-through school
- Motto: Seek the good
- Established: 1864
- Head teacher: Marie-Claire Futamata
- Gender: Coeducational
- Enrollment: 398 (Primary); 625 (Secondary)
- Houses: St. Columba, St. Margaret, St. Andrew
- Colour
- Feeder schools: St. Dominic's, Crieff; St. Stephen's, Blairgowrie; Our Lady's, Letham, Perth.
- Website: st-johnsacademy.pkc.sch.uk

St John's RC Academy is a Catholic, 2-18 all-through school located in Perth, Scotland.

== History ==
The academy resulted from a merger of St John’s Primary School and St Columba’s High School. The secondary part of the school opened in March 2010 and the nursery and primary part in November 2011. John Swinney MSP officially opened the academy in December 2011.

The original St John’s School was established in 1864 while St. Columba’s High School officially opened in 1967.

== Facilities ==
The academy is located at the centre of the North Inch Community Campus. This campus has a range of facilities open to the community including a library, meeting rooms, drama and music facilities and sports facilities. All of these can be accessed by the students.

== Sports ==
The academy has formed a sports partnership with Perth Grammar School. This partnership was awarded the first inter-denominational Sports Comprehensive status in Scotland under the banner, 'Everyone Active'. It won the Sunday Mail/Sports Scotland Scottish Sports Award 2011. The winning category was 'School Sports Award'. The partnership organises joint sports teams.

== Awards ==
The academy received the UNICEF UK Rights Respecting School Gold Award in 2014 and 2019.

== Notable pupils ==
- Colin McCredie - actor
- Stephen Gethins MP
- Dave Doogan MP
- Fran Franczak - footballer for St Johnstone
