= Glenburn, Paisley =

Suburb of Paisley, Renfrewshire, Scotland

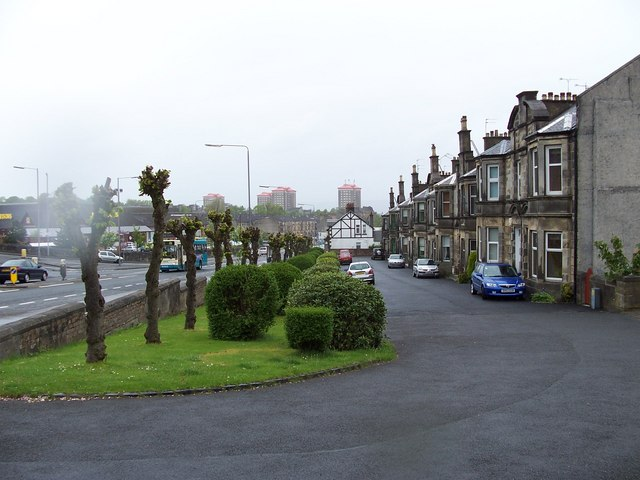
Neilston Road

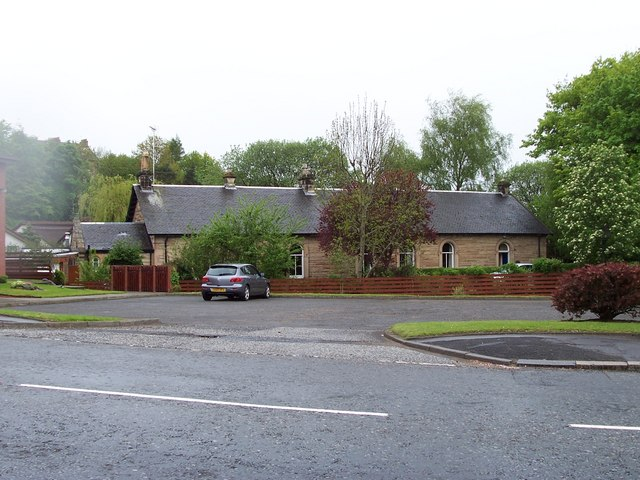
The former railway station

Glenburn is a large suburb situated to the south of Paisley, close to the Gleniffer Braes. Glenburn has three primary schools (Bushes Primary, Langcraigs Primary and St. Peter's Primary).

A public library and a new housing development can be found at Skye Crescent. Other shops can be found in Glenburn on Braehead Road and Glenburn Road. Glenburn is also close to Foxbar, another suburb in Paisley.
