= Simon Kempston =

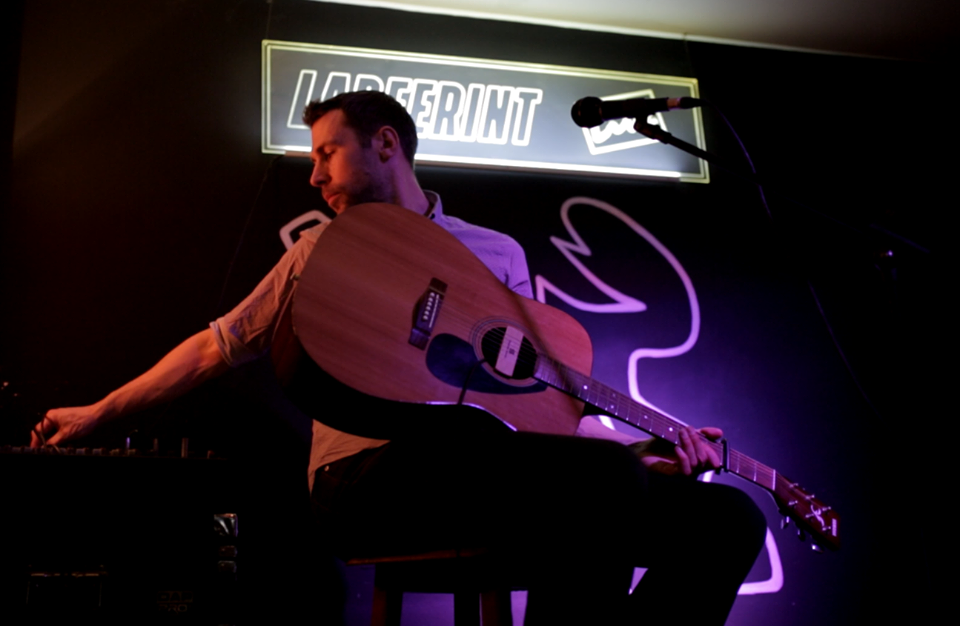
- Kempston in Nis, Serbia, 2018

Background information
- Born: Edinburgh, Scotland
- Genres: Folk; blues; classical
- Occupations: Musician; singer-songwriter; guitarist
- Instruments: Vocals, guitar, slide guitar
- Years active: 2008–present
- Website: simonkempston.co.uk

Simon Kempston (born Simon Currie) is a Scottish singer-songwriter and acoustic guitarist from Dundee, Scotland.

== Career ==
Simon Kempston is now based in Edinburgh. The Herald has referred to him as 'one of Scotland's very best singer-songwriters'.

He has released nineteen albums and one EP, eleven of which have been engineered and co-produced by Scottish folk musician Ian McCalman of This discography consists of eleven song-based albums, one song-based EP, five instrumental acoustic guitar albums, one classical guitar album and two further song-based alt-blues albums under the pseudonym Man Gone Missing.

Simon Kempston has performed in 38 countries on five continents across the world, and in 2023 performed more than 100 concerts including his debut tour of South America. In the past he has performed at many major music venues and festivals including Celtic Connections, Sligo Live, Ronnie Scott's Jazz Club, Cropredy Festival and the Edinburgh Festival Fringe.

== Discography ==
Simon Kempston

- Our Land, Their Freedom EP (2008)
- Carefree Prisoner (2009)
- Impasse (2011)
- How We Once Were (2012)
- A Fine Line (2013)
- The Last Car (2015)
- Vanishing Act (2017)
- Broken Before (2018)
- Hand On My Heart (2020)
- You Can't Win Every Time (2022)
- My Dreams Are Theirs (2024)
- A Poet Or A Painter (2026)

Simon Kempston (Instrumental Guitar)

- The Loss of an Unknown (2009)
- Estranged (2014)
- Onwards She Travels (2017)
- In Gratitude of Solitude (2020)
- Moonrise Over Mostar (2023)

Man Gone Missing

- Beyond Desolate (2009)
- Burn You (2010)

Collaborative Albums

- Tangled Strings (2025) with Paul Tasker
