= Foxbar =

District of Paisley, Scotland

Coordinates: 55.8202°N 4.4639°W

- The Durrockstock Dam

- Location within Renfrewshire
- Council area: Renfrewshire
- Lieutenancy area: Renfrewshire
- Country: Scotland
- Sovereign state: United Kingdom
- Post town: PAISLEY
- Postcode district: PA2
- Dialling code: 01505
- Police: Scotland
- Fire: Scottish
- Ambulance: Scottish
- UK Parliament: Paisley and Renfrewshire South

Foxbar is a district of Paisley, bordered by the Gleniffer Braes and Paisley town centre. Consisting mostly of residential areas, Foxbar has rapidly grown over the past century to be one of the largest housing areas in the town. The local authority (Renfrewshire Council) has invested significantly in the area, which nowadays boasts multiple community centres, public parks and social areas.

== Housing ==
The district consists of local authority, housing association and privately owned housing. In recent years there has been significant investment in private and social housing including the construction of new build estates and refurbishment of existing tenement buildings and Oliphant court, Foxbar's only remaining high rise.

Foxbar previously had five 14 storey high rise flats, each containing 56 flats situated above Durrockstock park in the top end area of the district.

- Oliphant Court
- Marmion Court
- Heriot Court
- Montrose Court
- Waverley Court

Waverley Court was demolished in 1996 followed by Marmion, Montrose and Heriot Court in 2004. Oliphant Court was refurbished in recent years and is currently owned and maintained by Paisley South housing association.

== Services and amenities ==
=== Schools ===
Foxbar has 3 primary schools (Heriot, St. Pauls and Brediland) and one secondary school (Gleniffer High).

=== Amenities ===
Foxbar has 3 community centres and one library. The main Foxbar community centre is situated beneath the library on Amochrie Road and Ivanhoe Road. The Youth Drop In is situated on Spey Avenue. The resource centre is situated on Amochrie Road.

Foxbar comparably has a large retail presence uncommon for modern housing developments. Currently the various sub-areas are supplied by multiple local newsagents and grocery stores; however post office facilities, a pharmacy and a local butcher also are available.

== Public transport ==
Foxbar is served by two McGill's buses:

- the 61 from Paisley town centre to the top of Foxbar, via Gleniffer High School
- the 17 (previously the 60) from Foxbar Heriot Avenue to the Queen Elizabeth University Hospital via the Royal Alexandra Hospital and Paisley town centre.

== Recreation ==
Popular places in Foxbar are Durrockstock Park, which is a Local Nature Reserve and the walkway to the Gleniffer Braes.
