= Drew Wilson =

British cyclist

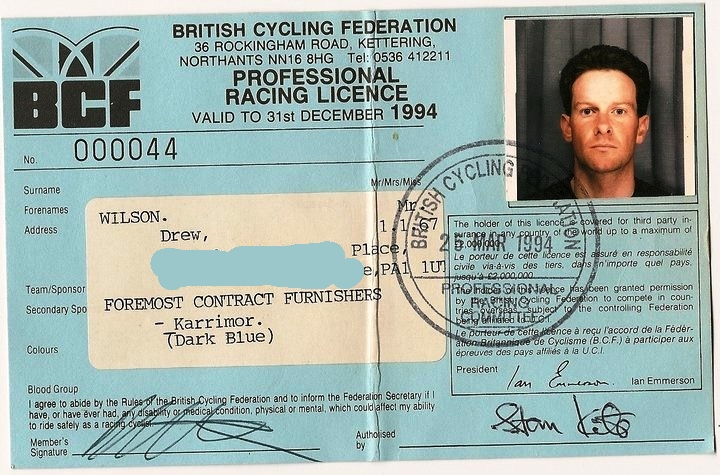
- Drew Wilson's race licence from 1994

Personal information
- Born: 1 January 1967 (age 59) Johnstone, Scotland

Cycling career
- Sport: Cycling
- Discipline: Road
- Role: Rider
- Rider type: All rounder

Amateur teams
- Johnstone Wheelers
- GS Bottegonne

Professional teams
- 1993 Banana - Falcon
- 1994 Foremost - Karrimor

Drew Wilson (born 1 January 1967) is a Scottish former junior and senior road race cycling champion in the 80s and 90s who turned professional in 1994 after trialing with Banana/Falcon Representing Scotland at the Commonwealth Games in 1986, 1994 & 1998.

== Biography ==
Wilson was encouraged to take up cycling by his mother and father at the age of 12. In his early teens he became the highest ranked junior road cyclist in Scotland.

He began to build a hard earned reputation as a junior, representing GB at two junior world championships. Wilson rode for Italy's second biggest Italian team GS Bottegonne headed by the Italian sprinter Mario Cipollini. In 1993 Wilson had a successful trial with the UK's No.1 professional team Banana - Falcon and turned professional for them in 1994.

Wilson retired from professional cycling not long after representing Scotland in his third Commonwealth Games in Kuala Lumpur in 1998.

== Scotland Commonwealth Games Team ==
- 1986 Scotland
- 1994 Vancouver
- 1998 Kuala Lumpur

== Cycling history ==
- GS Bottegonne team rider (Italy's second biggest amateur cycling team)
- Tour of Britain rider
- Scottish road champion six times
- Scottish junior road champion
- Scottish senior road champion
- Scottish Criterium champion twice
- Scottish senior BAR champion twice
- Professional road rider with Banana/Falcon and Foremost/Karrimor cycling team
- World championship rider twice for Great Britain
- Winner – Glasgow-Dunoon road race twice
- Winner – David Bell memorial road race in 1996 and 1998
- Winner – Drummond trophy road race three times

== Honours, decorations, awards and distinctions ==
In 1994, Wilson was awarded an honorary life membership of the Johnstone Wheelers Cycling Club.

== The business of cycling ==
Wilson had an early introduction to bike building, sales and maintenance whilst working part-time for his first sponsors, Dooley's Cycles. After retiring from professional cycling he learned even more about the technical aspects of bike design and aerodynamics whilst working for Massi, Raleigh and Ridley.

In 2014 Wilson launched VisualBikeFit, a bespoke bike fitting service in his studio at the foot of the Crow Road in Lennoxtown.

== See also ==
- British Cycling Points 1998
- Johnstone Wheelers List of Scottish Champions
- Scotland at the Commonwealth Games
