= Holy Cross High School, Hamilton =

UK secondary school

Coordinates: 55.7855°N 4.0553°W

Holy Cross High School is a Catholic High School in Hamilton, South Lanarkshire, in Scotland.

== History ==
The original site on Muir Street started out as St Mary's Primary in the 1930s and became Holy Cross High School in the 1950s using the original St Mary's building and some prefabricated wooden buildings. External buildings were used for Art teaching. The main stone built building housed the Rector's office and the main staff rooms along with Classics, English, Maths and Physical Education departments.

Early in the 1970s, the wooden structures were torn down to make room for the prefabricated structures made of concrete and steel, which made up the majority of the site and were constructed between 1970 and 1971. The original 1930s building remained until 2010 when the Muir Street site was completely demolished after Trinity High, normally based in Rutherglen, had finished their temporary occupation while their new school was being built.

In 2007 Holy Cross High School relocated to a new building in New Park Street as part of South Lanarkshire Council's ongoing school modernisation programme. As of 2020, it has a roll of almost 1200 pupils.

As of 2023 the head teacher is Carla Fagan.

== Motto and badge ==
The school's motto is "Spes Unica" ("Our only hope") referring to the depiction of the cross on the school badge.

== Notable former pupils ==
- Matthew Clarke (b. 1947) - Judge, Lord Clarke
- Geraldine O'Neill (b. 1955) - novelist
- Gregory Clark (b. 1957) - Professor of Economics University of California Davis
- Willie McStay (b. 1961) - footballer, Celtic F.C.
- Leo Cushley (b. 1961) - Archbishop of St. Andrews and Edinburgh
- Paul McStay (b. 1964) - footballer, Celtic F.C.
- Martin Boyce (b. 1967) - Turner Prize winning artist
- Alan McManus (b. 1971) - Snooker player
- Phil O'Donnell (1972–2007) - footballer, Motherwell F.C., Celtic F.C.
- John McCusker (b. 1973) - Musician, producer
- Paul Hartley (b. 1976) - football manager and former player, Cove Rangers F.C.
- Michael Hart (b. 1980) - Preston North End player
- Stephen McManus (b. 1982) - footballer, Motherwell F.C.
- Donnie Burns - Dancer 14-time World Professional Latin champion
