= Birkenshaw, North Lanarkshire =

Village in North Lanarkshire, Scotland

Coordinates: 55°50′06″N 4°05′16″W

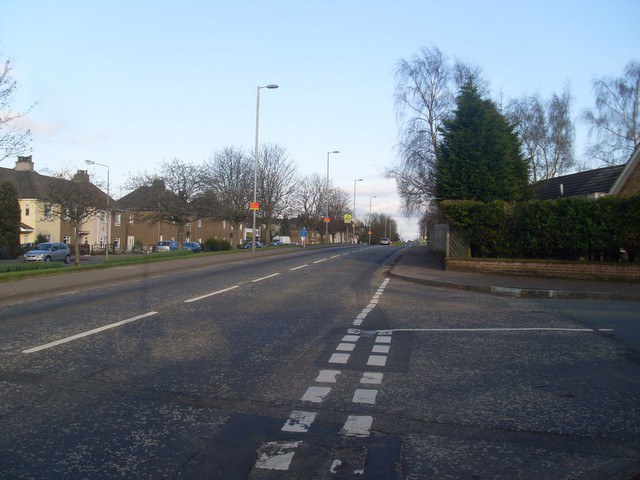
Old Edinburgh Road, Birkenshaw

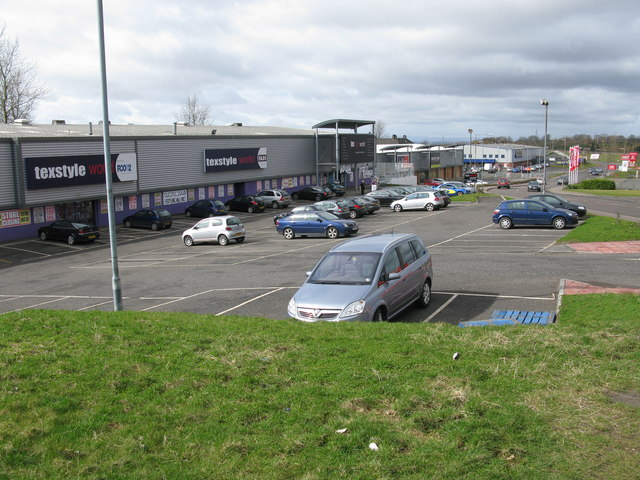
Birkenshaw Trading Estate in 2010

Birkenshaw is a village in North Lanarkshire, Scotland, to the east of Glasgow, and in proximity to Uddingston, Tannochside and Viewpark. Historically it is part of Lanarkshire. Largely a residential area, it is more widely known for the Birkenshaw Trading Estate (Rannoch Road) which contains a range of DIY, electrical and furniture stores. It is sometimes considered as part of Viewpark and is contained within the Greater Glasgow conurbation.

It gained some notoriety after the serial killer Peter Manuel, the "beast of Birkenshaw", lived in the village while committing his crimes.
