= Schools of Ambition programme =

School funding scheme in Scotland

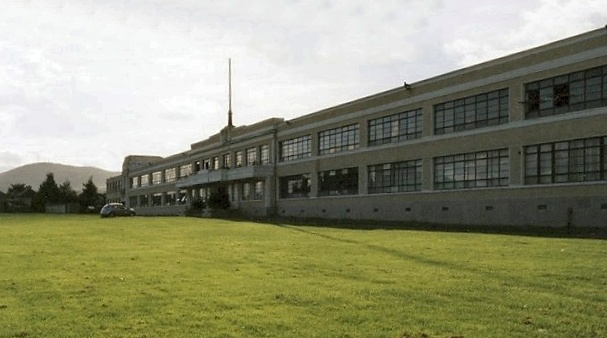
First Minister Jack McConnell launched the programme during a visit to Inverness High School on 16 September 2005. This school was one of the first 20 Schools of Ambition.

The Schools of Ambition programme, also called the Schools of Ambition initiative, was a government programme in Scotland that aimed to improve school character and performance by offering struggling secondary schools philanthropist money and an extra annual £100,000 in government funding for three years. This would then be spent towards implementing a transformation plan that could include environmental changes, investment into curricula and staff, and cooperation with businesses, sixth forms and the local community. Participating schools became Schools of Ambition, specialist schools that likely had a change in management, which aimed to stand out as innovating, leading schools that would inspire the youth. The scheme was launched by Jack McConnell's Labour–Liberal Democrat coalition government in 2005 and discontinued by Alex Salmond's SNP government in 2010.

Before the launch of the programme, only seven out of Scotland's 386 secondary schools had specialist school status.

== Development ==
In July 2004, at the same time as the launch of the British government's educational five-year plan for England, in which a specialist school system would be established, it was alleged by sources that Scottish ministers were in negotiations with entrepreneurs to privately invest into new proposed specialist schools in Scotland. Entrepreneurs speculated to have taken part included Conservative Party supporter Lord Irvine, Labour Party lord Willie Haughey and philanthropist Tom Hunter. These new specialist schools would not be based on England's city academies, which at this time were specialist schools independent from local authority control with private sponsors influencing their curricula, staff and ethos, but would instead be schools "that will link private sector funding with public sector investment [...] with more flexibility than current schools". First Minister Jack McConnell was revealed to have at least agreed with the "principle" of private funding after the negotiations, although "no firm decisions" were made.

These proposals were confirmed by McConnell in September 2004, when he announced that 20 secondary schools identified as the worst in the country would benefit from extra resources and funding from the private sector, namely philanthropist donors, and the Scottish Executive through a new Schools of Ambition initiative. As compensation, these schools had to promise to improve their attendance, attainment and behaviour. McConnell and his education minister Peter Peacock insisted that these donors would have no influence in these schools and that they would be completely comprehensive. They would be modelled after North Lanarkshire's specialist schools, which were unselective comprehensives, and would specialise in subjects like art, sport and music. Like English specialist schools, they would also be centres of excellence in these subjects. The programme would be granted £8 million every year.

The programme was built-upon in the November 2004 education white paper Ambitious, Excellent Schools: Our Agenda for Action. This paper established the Scottish government's agenda for modernising comprehensive education, with plans to "see rich, colourful and diverse [comprehensive schools], offering choice for pupils and with ambition for themselves and for each and every one of their pupils". The programme would enable its schools to seek support from philanthropic or local benefactors and would give them administrative independence. Schools expected to gain from the programme would be nominated for participation by their local government authorities and put forward to a special panel full of the representatives of the authorities, Her Majesty's Inspectors and the Scottish Executive. They would then submit a transformation plan to the panel, which could include investment into environmental changes, curricula and staff, and cooperation with businesses, sixth forms and the local community. If approved, the schools would then gain School of Ambition status and receive an extra annual £100,000 in government funding for three years and the possibility to receive more money from philanthropist donors. These schools would have specialist school status and would likely have new management. Schools judged by inspectors to need significant improvement and support would be approved to the programme automatically.

== Implementation ==
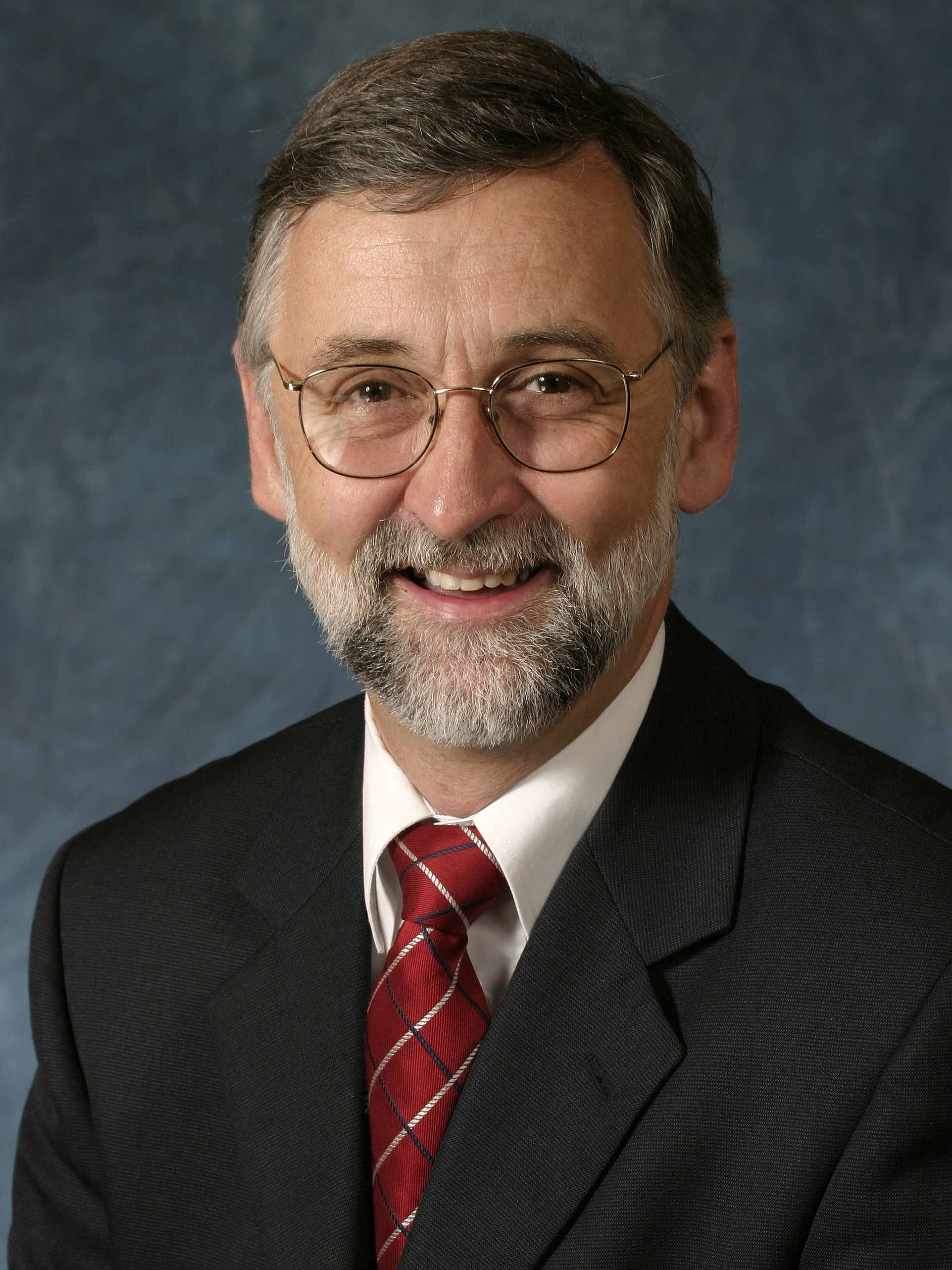
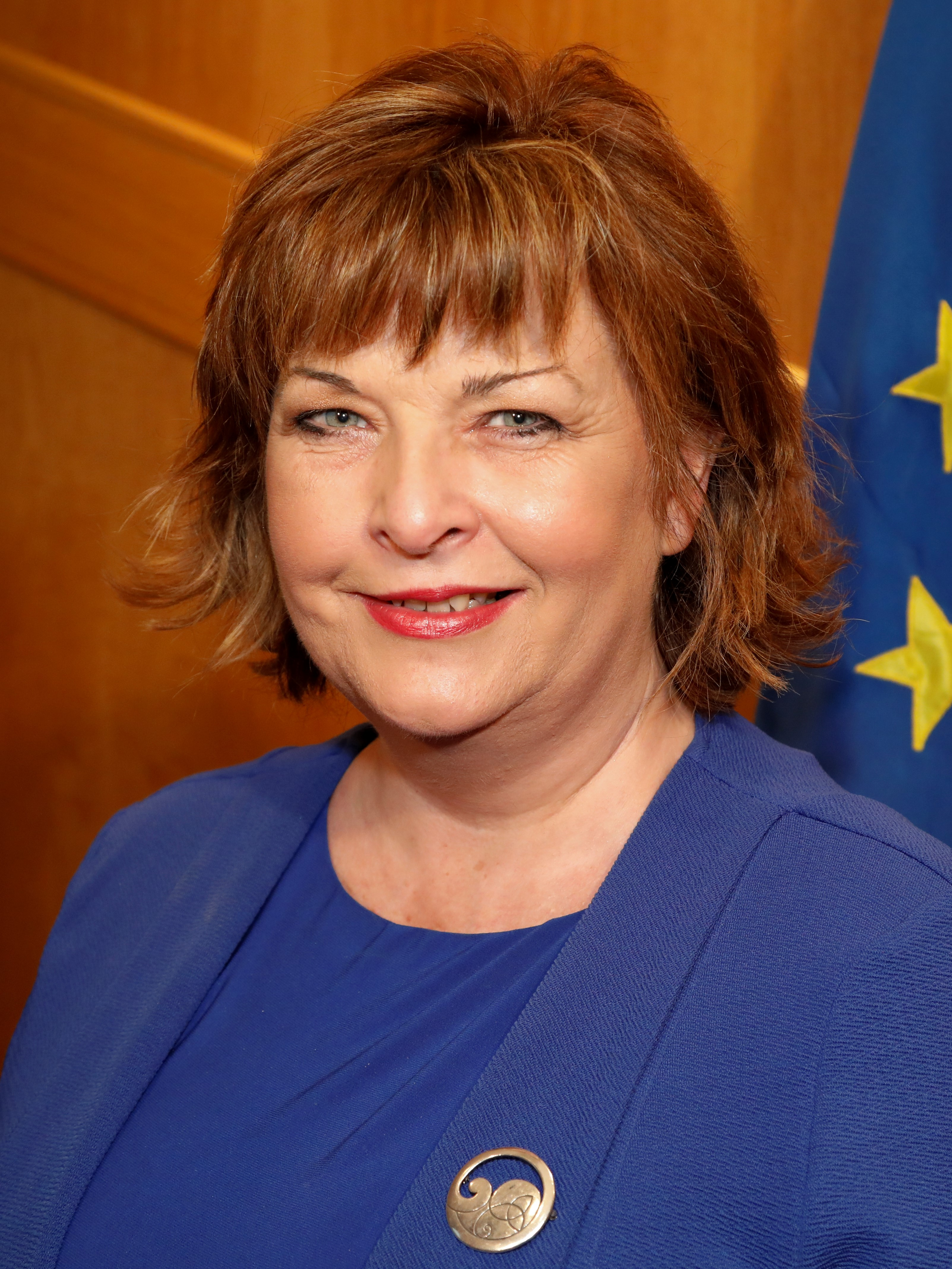
Labour Education Minister Peter Peacock and SNP Education Secretary Fiona Hyslop.

In February 2005 government ministers, including Education Minister Peter Peacock, invited local councils to bid their secondary schools for a place in the programme as one of its first 20 schools. Schools had to establish a vision and make a transformation plan, explaining its effects on pupils and the local community. 43 schools were shortlisted by late-April and almost 30 councils had put forward a bid, with only four yet to have done so. The 20 winning schools were announced in June, making up the first "tranche" of the programme. All of these schools were partnered with a potential philanthropist.

The programme was launched by the Scottish Executive Education Department on 16 September 2005, when First Minister Jack McConnell visited Inverness High School, which was one of the 20 Schools of Ambition announced earlier that year. Before the programme's launch, only seven out of Scotland's 386 secondary schools had specialist school status, a figure that would subsequently grow with the new Schools of Ambition.

In February 2006, it was announced that six more schools were joining the programme's first tranche, although their identities and locations were yet to be revealed. Tom Hunter, who was now investing £600,000 into the programme, implied that these schools would be located in Glasgow. They were revealed in April 2006, alongside a seventh School of Ambition, forming the programme's second tranche. Only one of these were located in Glasgow. At the same time, Education Minister Peter Peacock decided to open up bidding for the third tranche, claiming that the programme had made good progress. 21 of these schools were announced in February 2007, giving the programme almost 50 Schools of Ambition. Three more would also join: the third tranche was finalised in March 2007, leaving 51 Schools of Ambition across Scotland's 32 local authority areas. A 52nd school had also joined the programme by 2008.

A new SNP government was sworn into office after the 2007 Scottish Parliament election. The new education minister, now renamed education secretary, was Fiona Hyslop. Hyslop had previously welcomed the programme when in opposition for bringing more support to schools, but stressed that it would benefit only a few schoolchildren. The SNP's policy was to give all schools School of Ambition status. It was then announced in March 2008 that the new government would be discontinuing the programme in 2010 under Hyslop's orders. Hyslop said the "lessons learned from the project [would be] put into practice across all schools so that all schools can be schools of ambition" and confirmed that funding would continue until the end of the current parliament.

The programme ended in 2010 with the expiration of the third tranche's period of extra funding.

== Reception ==
When the programme was announced in September 2004, it was unclear whether the new Schools of Ambition would be selective. Some teaching unions opposed the Schools of Ambition programme on these grounds, adding that the new plans would introduce selection "by the back door", a claim that was often used against specialist schools in England. This uncertainty began when, during the announcement, First Minister Jack McConnell said that "there [would] be no elitist selection of pupils", despite having said two weeks earlier that comprehensive schools were "ordinary" and had no place in Scotland, thereby implying that a move to selective education in Scotland was coming. McConnell's aides had also claimed a week before the announcement that he saw selection as a way to improve standards. Furthermore, an alleged source from the Scottish Executive believed that selection in the programme was unavoidable, as they expected a need for its schools "to select according to narrow aptitudes in order to allow pupils to pursue their talents". This source also claimed that ministers in the government had avoided using the term "selection" as they did not yet know how the new schools would work and feared misrepresentation of the programme in the media. "Elitist selection" as dismissed by McConnell was therefore claimed to have meant "selection on a broad spectrum of academic ability".

Many also viewed the programme as having too weak of an impact. This opinion was shared between the main political opposition during the McConnell government, the SNP and Conservative Party, and also the Convention of Scottish Local Authorities (COSLA) and Scottish Secondary Teachers' Association (SSTA). COSLA and the SNP did however welcome the programme, with COSLA in particular supporting "most of the reforms", criticising it only for a small focus around "schools in isolation". The SNP's education spokeswoman Fiona Hyslop was concerned that it would only benefit a few schoolchildren and schools, with her party calling for every school to receive School of Ambition status. Meanwhile, her Conservative counterpart James Douglas-Hamilton believed it was "grossly insufficient" and did nothing to address the alleged two-tier system in Scottish state education, with his colleague Brian Monteith proposing extra pupil funding for all schools. The Conservatives later saw the programme as a success, coming to its defence by the time the SNP had entered government. The Scottish Socialist Party criticised the programme for ignoring class-size reduction and introducing school funding from the private sector.

== See also ==
- Specialist schools programme
- Fresh Start programme
- List of Schools of Ambition
