= Leckie & Leckie =

- Parent company: HarperCollins
- Country of origin: United Kingdom
- Headquarters location: Glasgow, Scotland, UK
- Publication types: Books
- Official website: www.leckieandleckie.co.uk

Leckie and Leckie is an educational publishing firm based in Glasgow, Scotland.

The main focus of the company is educational books for students taking Scottish Qualifications Authority (SQA) courses. They offer books on most Standard Grade, Intermediate 1, Intermediate 2, National 5, Higher and Advanced Higher courses.
