= Intermediate 2 =

Educational qualification in Scotland

Intermediate 2 level is Level 5 on the Scottish Credit and Qualifications Framework; it was the level between Higher and Standard Grade Credit.

It was initially available to pupils (generally in S5) who achieved a grade 3 or 4 Standard Grade but, with some schools choosing to use Intermediates over Standard Grade, it became more available to S3/S4 pupils (dependent upon the school or individual departments within schools choice). It was believed that in certain subjects Intermediates were more useful to the students than Standard Grades because the work required for completion was more demanding, and better prepared the pupils for Higher, with a similar format to the reformed higher exams. Furthermore, the pupils were introduced to Higher work before they had sat their Intermediate 2 exam which also made the transition easier (again this is very much dependent upon the subject).

The Intermediate 2 courses were generally made up of 3 national units. The main exceptions were English, Physics, and French, with mandatory internal assessments in each. The courses all consisted of 40 hours. Mandatory passes were needed in the internal assessments or NAB's National Assessment Bank to gain the overall Course Award. However internal assessments were minimum competence, and so many schools introduced end-of-unit assessments to help stop complacency.

As with other exams in the Higher Still curriculum, the grades pupils could receive in the final exam were A (usually about 70%+), B (usually about 60%+), a C (usually about 50%+), a D (usually 45%-49%) or a Fail (below 45%).

Pupils also sat for preparatory examinations (more commonly referred to as "Prelims" or, in some schools, "Mocks") before the final examinations usually administered in December or January. These examinations were conducted under final examination conditions, containing more challenging content than the final examination and helped prepare students. The next level of education provided in Scotland were the "Highers"

Up until the summer of 2015, Intermediate 2 was a level of qualification certificated by the Scottish Qualifications Authority. It is no longer available and has been replaced by a new qualification level called "National 5".

== Subjects Offered at Intermediate 2 ==
- Accounting
- Administration
- Art and Design
- Biology
- Biotechnology
- Business Management
- Cantonese (Traditional/Simplified)
- Chemistry
- Classical Studies
- Computing
- Drama
- Economics
- English
- English (for speakers of other languages)
- French
- Gaelic (non-native speakers)
- Gàidhlig (native speakers)
- Geography
- Geology
- German
- Graphic Communications
- History
- Home Economics: Fashion and Textile Technology
- Home Economics: Health and Food Technology
- Hospitality: Professional Cookery
- Human Biology
- Information Systems
- Italian
- Latin
- Managing Environmental Resources
- Mandarin Chinese (Traditional/Simplified Chinese)
- Mathematics
- Media Studies
- Modern Studies
- Music
- Physical Education
- Physics
- Product Design
- Religious, Moral and Philosophical Studies
- Russian
- Spanish
