= Scottish Qualifications Certificate =

Educational qualification in Scotland

The Scottish Qualifications Certificate (SQC) is the successor to the Scottish Certificate of Education and the Record of Education and Training, and is the main educational qualification awarded to students in secondary, further, and vocational education. The SQC is awarded by Qualifications Scotland. It forms part of the wider array of qualifications available in the Scottish education system, including Scottish Vocational Qualifications, Higher National Certificates and Higher National Diplomas. Each level is fully integrated with the Scottish Credit and Qualifications Framework and the three upper levels are awarded UCAS Tariff Points.

The SQC recognises performance in National Qualifications, Higher National Qualifications, Scottish Vocational Qualifications and other awards. As it is not part of the National Qualifications Framework of England, Wales and Northern Ireland, it is not available to state schools there, but students from other nations do study for the qualification.

== National Qualifications Levels and grades ==
National Qualifications are available at several levels, with the possible grades and rough GCSE and A-level equivalent shown:

SCQF Level	SQC Level	Grades	New UCAS Tariff	Old UCAS Tariff	GCSE/A-level
7	Advanced Higher				
7	Advanced Higher	A	56	130	Equal to A-level at A*
7	Advanced Higher	B	48	110	Equal to A-level at A
7	Advanced Higher	C	40	90	Equal to A-level at B
7	Advanced Higher	D	32	72	Equal to A-level at C
6	Higher				
6	Higher	A	33	80	Same as A-level at C
6	Higher	B	27	65	Greater than A-level at D and AS at A
6	Higher	C	21	50	Less than A-level at D and greater than A-level at E; same as AS-level at B
6	Higher	D	15	36	Less than A-level at E and greater than AS at D
5	Intermediate 2 / National 5				
5	Intermediate 2 / National 5	A	0	42	Greater than A-level at E and AS at C
5	Intermediate 2 / National 5	B	0	35	Greater than AS at D
5	Intermediate 2 / National 5	C	0	28	Greater than AS at E
5	Intermediate 2 / National 5	D	-	-	-
4	Intermediate 1 / National 4				
4	Intermediate 1 / National 4	A	-	-	-
4	Intermediate 1 / National 4	B	-	-	-
4	Intermediate 1 / National 4	C	-	-	-
4	Intermediate 1 / National 4	D	-	-	-
3	Access 3 / National 3				
3	Access 3 / National 3	A	-	-	-
3	Access 3 / National 3	B	-	-	-
3	Access 3 / National 3	C	-	-	-
3	Access 3 / National 3	D	-	-	-

== See also ==
- Education in Scotland
- Learning and Teaching Scotland
- Scottish Government
