= National Assessment Bank =

Internal exam used by the Scottish Qualifications Authority

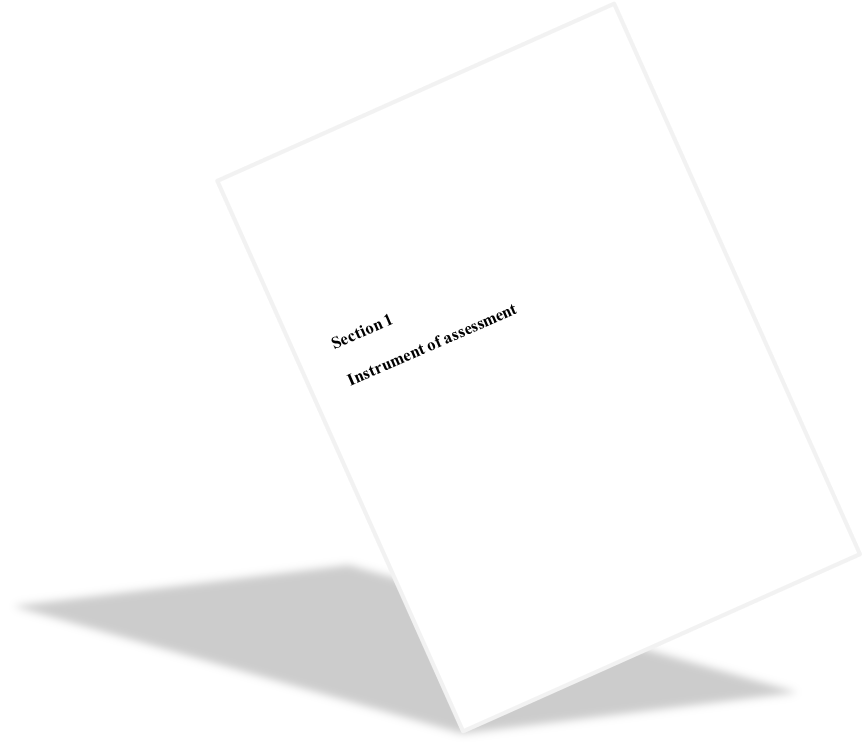
NAB Front Cover

National Assessment Banks were a testing resource in Scottish education. They were commonly referred to as NABs after the National Assessment Bank from which these assessments are selected by teachers, are internal assessments that used to form part of the Scottish Higher and Intermediate courses. These were assessed by a centre and are moderated by the Scottish Qualifications Authority. Candidates sitting a courses at Intermediate 1, Intermediate 2, Higher and Advanced Higher levels were required to have passed a NAB for each unit in order to sit the end of course examination. The NAB examinations are, as of 2010, no longer compulsory, and pupils can sit the final examination without sitting a NAB. Often, pupils must pass a prelim to sit the final exam.

Intermediate and Higher courses are divided into three units (or in some cases, such as Intermediate Physics, two whole units and two half units). Each pupil will sit the NAB after completing a particular unit. A pass in the NAB is required for the pupil to continue with the rest of the course and to sit the final exam. Each pupil is allowed a resit if they fail their first NAB, but if they fail the resit their individual situation will be considered by their teacher, who will then decide whether they are allowed to continue with the rest of the course.

The standard time for a NAB is 45 minutes, and 25 minutes for a half-unit NAB. However, the time allowed for each NAB often varies depending on the specific subject.

A NAB has no grade awarded to it – it is simply a pass or fail. The NABs are often made up of "core" course (grade "C") type questions, allowing candidates of all abilities to gain a pass. Ideally, candidates who are aiming for "A" or "B" passes in the end of course exam should be passing NABs comfortably. Depending on the subject, the percentage required for a pass is around 50–60%.
