= Technological studies =

School subject taught in Scotland

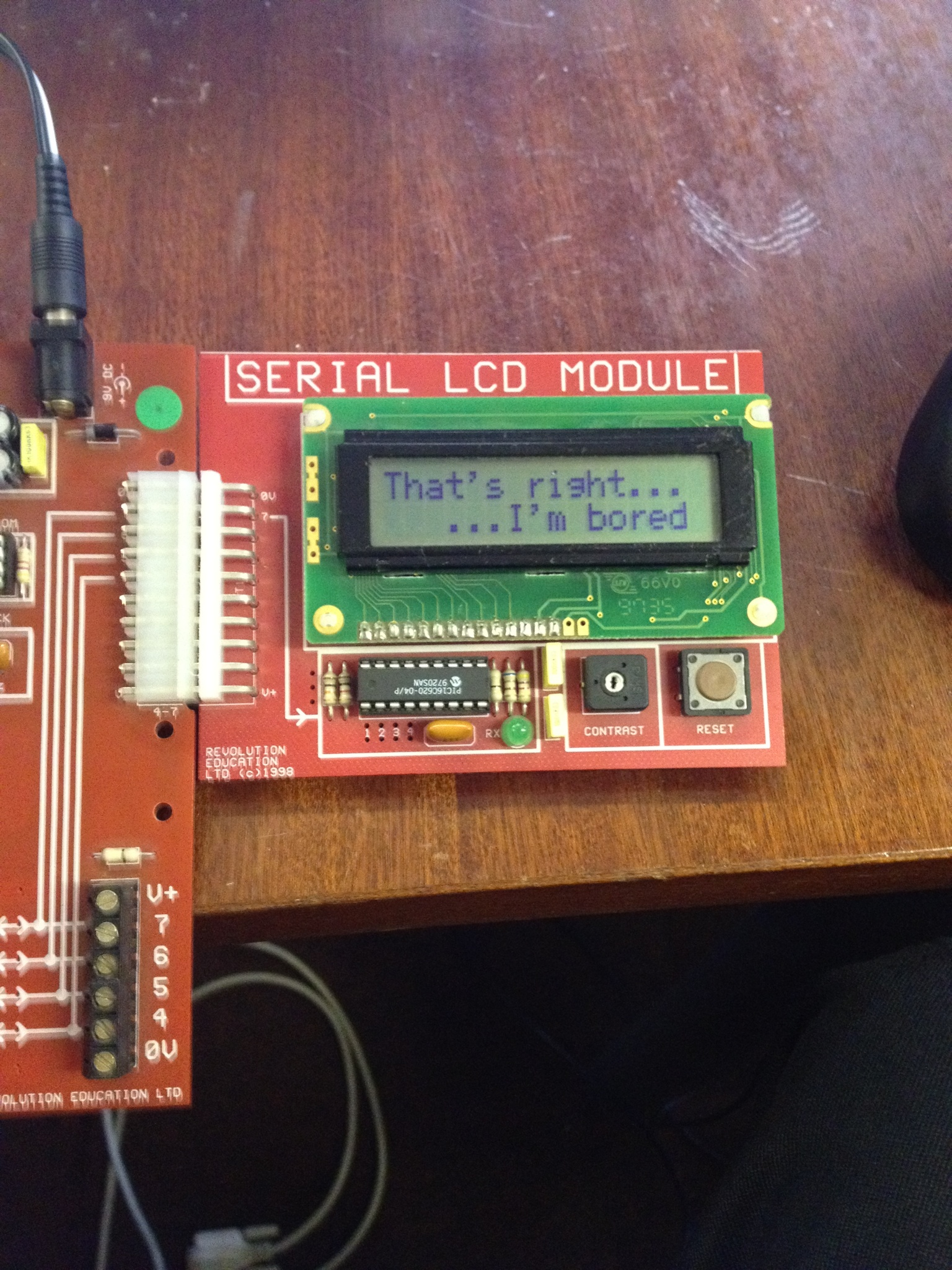
A Higher Technological Studies pupil interfaces a serial LCD module with a STAMP micro-controller.

Technological Studies was a subject taught in Scottish secondary schools. It encompassed a wide range of engineering-related topics and provided a solid knowledge base for further study in engineering-related disciplines. Qualifications Scotland (was SQA) replaced Technological Studies with National 5 and Higher Engineering Science in 2015.

== The Standard Grade Course ==
- Introduction to Systems (8 hours):

- System, sub-system and control diagrams.

- Pneumatic Systems (22 hours):

- Valves, actuators, pistons, reservoirs, restrictors and diagrammatic representations.

- Applied Electronics (53 hours):

- Input transducers, output transducers, logic gates, boolean expressions, truth tables and transistors.
- Kirchhoff's laws, Ohm's law, electrical power and energy

- Programmable Control (42 hours):

- Flow-charting, P-Basic programming and basic components of a microprocessor.

- Energy (15 hours):

- Kinetic, potential, heat and electrical energy calculations. Work calculations. Efficiency and energy audits.

- Mechanical Systems (20 hours):

- Types of motion and motion conversion, conditions of static equilibrium, moments, torque, gear systems and pulley systems.

Pupils sit exams at both General and Credit level lasting 75 and 90 minutes, respectively.

== The Higher Course ==
- Applied Electronics (40 hours):

- Comparator, differential, summing, voltage follower, inverting, non-inverting operational amplifier configurations.
- Basic transistor theory, associated calculations and MOSFET operation.
- CMOS and TTL IC comparison, logic gates, truth tables, boolean expressions and NAND equivalents.

- Structures and Materials (20 hours):

- Resolution of forces and moments.
- 2D nodal analysis.
- Stress/strain, load/extension graphs and Young's modulus.
- Factor of safety.

- Systems and Control (40 hours):

- P-basic programming.
- A/D and D/A conversion.
- Assorted Input and Output devices.
- Data-logging, multiplexing and pulse-width modulation.

- Case Study (20 hours):

- Pupils research a particular product or device suitable to the course and produce a report which analyses and considers the economic, social and environmental influences of the system.

Pupils sit a 3 hour exam which determines their final grade. Three internal National Assessment Banks are sat (one for each topic), each of these must be passed to sit the final exam.

== The Advanced Higher Course ==
- Applied Electronics (40 hours):

- Bistables, Integrators, Schmitt triggers, Oscillators, ADC and DAC.

- Systems and Control (40 hours):

- Design of PIC control systems using low level assembly language, interfacing.

- Structures and Materials (20 hours):

- Simple bending theory, analysis of frame structures, shear force and bending moment.

- Project Enquiry (20 hours):

- Research and production of an enquiry report on some aspect of engineering.

Pupils sit a 3 hour examination which determines their final grade.
