= Scottish Examination Board =

Former examination board in Scotland

- Abbreviation: SEB
- Merged into: Scottish Qualifications Authority
- Formation: 1964
- Dissolved: 1997"The Scottish Examination Board and Scottish Vocational Education Council (Dissolution) (Scotland) Order 1997". Legislation.gov.uk. The National Archives.
- Headquarters: Dalkeith
- Region served: Scotland
- Formerly called: Scottish Certificate of Education Examination Board (until 1982)

The Scottish Examination Board (SEB), formerly known as the Scottish Certificate of Education Examination Board (SCEEB), was the academic examination board for Scottish schools from 1965 to 1997.

== History ==
From their introduction in 1888 until 1964, Scottish school qualifications were awarded directly by the UK Government's Scottish Education Department.

The Scottish Certificate of Education Examination Board (SCEEB) was established in 1964 to take over the awarding of Scottish school qualifications from 1965. The SCEEB became known as the Scottish Examination Board (SEB) in 1982.

The SEB used to administer all of Scotland's academic qualifications, including Standard Grades and Highers.

On 1 April 1997, the Scottish Examination Board merged with the Scottish Vocational Education Council (SCOTVEC) to form the Scottish Qualifications Authority (SQA).
