= National 1 =

National 1 may refer to:

- National 1 (Scottish educational qualification), an educational qualification in Scotland and part of the larger Curriculum for Excellence
- National League 1, an English rugby union league.
- Championnat National 1, a French football league
- Nationale Masculine 1, a French basketball league
