= Social and Vocational Skills =

Social and Vocational Skills (SVS) is a subject which can be taken in high schools as a Standard Grade in Scotland. Unlike other subjects in the Scottish educational system, those who take it are picked specially to do it, normally due to failings in other subjects or social issues. There are exceptions to this rule however, such as Elgin Academy in Moray and Stranraer Academy Wigtownshire, where it is taken as an additional compulsory standard grade by all pupils, giving most students a possible total of 9.
