= National 2 =

National 2 might refer to:

- National 2 (Scottish educational qualification), an educational qualification in Scotland and part of the larger Curriculum for Excellence
- Championnat National 2, French football league
