= Scottish National =

Scottish National may refer to

- National (Scottish educational qualification), a secondary school-level qualification in the Scottish educational system
- The National (Scotland), a Scottish newspaper
- A resident or national of Scotland- see Demographics of Scotland
- Scottish National Party, a Scottish political party
