= Standard Grade =

Former educational qualification in Scotland

Standard Grades were Scotland's educational qualifications for students aged around 14 to 16 years. Introduced in 1986, the Grades were replaced in 2013 with the Scottish Qualifications Authority's National exams in a major shake-up of Scotland's education system as part of the Scottish Credit and Qualifications Framework overhaul.

Scottish Standard Grades roughly matched the English, Welsh and Northern Irish General Certificate of Secondary Education examinations in terms of level subject content and cognitive difficulty.

== History ==
Following the Munn and Dunning reports published in 1977, the Standard Grade replaced the old O-Grade qualification, and was phased in from 1986.

Standard Grade courses were taken over a student's third and fourth year in secondary education. Exams were taken at the end of the 4th Year (around May), with preliminary examinations taken several months earlier in November. (However, certain subjects may have been "fast tracked" at some schools (for example Dalziel High school, which was the first school to use this system), where the course is started in at the beginning of 2nd year and finished at the end of 3rd year (this meant that pupils start standard grades at age 12/13 and finish them at age 14/15). The exams were provided by the Scottish Qualifications Authority, which also offers the more recent National Qualifications on the Scottish Qualifications Certificate.

Students would typically study 8 subjects at Standard Grade. Generally speaking, different subjects could be taken independently of each other, although English and Mathematics were compulsory, and most schools would structure student choices so that at least one science subject, one social science (and often a modern language) were chosen. The two main restrictions on this choice were timetable arrangements, and the fact that many less popular subjects were not offered by all schools.

== Levels of award ==
There are three sub-levels (or "tiered" papers) at which Standard Grade exams can be taken, namely "Foundation Level", "General Level" and "Credit Level". At one sitting, students generally sit either the Foundation and General level papers together, or the General and Credit level papers together.

Students are awarded a numerical grade for each examination (which may consist of several papers) ranging from 1 (best) to 7. The table below lists the grades, the exam level and equivalence to the new National Qualification exams and the Scottish Credit and Qualifications Framework (SCQF for short).

Level	Grades	New Qualification	SCQF Level
Credit Level	1 and 2	National 5	SCQF 5
General Level	3 and 4	National 4	SCQF 4
Foundation Level	5 and 6	National 3	SCQF 3
Course Failed	7	—N/a	—N/a

== Higher Still ==
The Scottish Government Authorities responsible for Education decided to slowly phase out the Standard Grade system in favour of the Scottish Qualifications Authority's Higher Still system as many students and teachers felt that the jump from Standard Grade to Higher was too difficult, particularly in subjects such as English. Although they are not exactly the same, the Foundation Level is similar to Higher Still's Access 3 level, whilst General is similar to Intermediate 1 and Credit is similar to Intermediate 2.

Standard Grade exams were replaced progressively by the Curriculum for Excellence (CfE) system. Unlike Standard Grades the CfE does not involve external exams for the majority of levels. The new curriculum involves 5 levels; National 1, National 2, National 3, National 4, and National 5. National 1 to National 4 are awarded on the basis of coursework and tests generated and marked by the school, whereas students can achieve National 5 by passing examinations externally set by the SQA.

== Standard Grade subjects ==
=== Compulsory subjects ===
The Scottish Government states that all pupils must take the subjects below. However, there are exceptions.

- English (4 hours per week minimum)
- Mathematics (4 hours per week minimum)
- Science (At least one from: Chemistry, Biology, Physics, General Science) (3 hours per week minimum)
- Social Sciences (At least one from: History, Geography, Modern Studies or Classical Studies) (3 hours per week minimum)
- Physical Education (PE) ^{*} (1 hour per week minimum)
- Religious, Moral and Philosophical Education (RMPS) ^{*} (1 hour per week minimum)
- Education for Personal and Social Development (PSE)^{*} (1 hour per week minimum)

^{*} Core subject

Most schools in Scotland have periods between 50–55 minutes long, although this is generally accepted as an hour of a compulsory subject.

The course choice process begins after the Christmas and New Year of S2, with the completed forms being handed in around the end of February.

=== Subjects ===
List of subjects
- Language
  - English
  - French
  - Gàidhlig – For native speakers
  - Gaelic (Learners)
  - German
  - Italian
  - Russian
  - Spanish
  - Urdu
- Classics
  - Classical Greek
  - Latin
  - Classical Studies
- Social Sciences
  - Contemporary Social Studies
  - Economics
  - Geography
  - Travel and Tourism
  - History
  - Modern Studies
  - Religious and Moral Education
  - Social and Vocational Skills
- Expressive Arts
  - Art and Design
  - Craft and Design
  - Drama
  - Graphic Communication
  - Music
  - Physical Education
- Environmental and Scientific Studies
  - Biology
  - Chemistry
  - Home Economics
  - Standard grade Science
  - Physics
  - Technological studies
- Mathematics
  - Accounting and Finance
  - Administration
  - Business Management
  - Mathematics
- IT
  - Computing Studies
  - Administration

== See also ==
- Education in Scotland
- Higher Grade
- Advanced Higher Grade
