= Fifth grade =

Educational year group

Fifth grade (also 5th Grade or Grade 5) is the fifth or sixth year of formal or compulsory education. In the United States, this is mostly the last grade of primary school, but for some states, it could be the first year of middle school. Primary school generally goes from Kindergarten and ends in fifth or sixth grade. Students in fifth grade are usually 10–11 years old. In different countries, they have different names for fifth grade. The list of different versions is below, depending on the country.

== Canada ==
In Canada, the equivalent is Grade 5.

== United Kingdom ==
In England and Wales, the equivalent is Year 6.

In Scotland, 10–11 year olds are in primary school P7.

== Ireland ==
In Ireland, the equivalent is 5th class.

== Australia ==
In Australia, the equivalent is Year 5, which children generally start between the ages of ten and eleven. It is the second last year of primary school and the 6th year of school overall.

== Kazakhstan ==
In Kazakhstan, Class 5 (Kazakh: 5-сынып) is the first year of basic secondary education (негізгі орта мектеп). Students usually start at 10–11 years old, beginning in the middle stage of the 11-year general education system.

== Philippines ==
In the Philippines, the equivalent is Grade 5, and students can also start at age 9.

== United States ==
In the United States, grade 5 is known as 5th grade, potentially the last year of elementary school or the first year of middle school.

In the US, 41 states have implemented Common Core standards for 5th-grade curriculum in the English language and srts/mathematics.

Key English Language Arts Common Core standards for 5th grade students include:

- Ability to determine the theme of a book, story, or poem from details in the text
- Compare and contrast two or more characters, settings, or events in a story
- Describe how the narrator or speaker's point of view may influence how events are described
- Compare and contrast stories in the same genre.

Key Mathematics Common Core standards for 5th grade students include:

- Write and interpret numerical expressions in operations and algebraic thinking
- Ability to add, subtract, multiply, and divide fractions
- Convert like measurement units
- Understand volume as an attribute of 3-dimensional space
- Graph points on the coordinate plane
- Classify two-dimensional figures into categories based on their properties

== See also ==
- Primary education
- Educational stage
- Education in England
- Education in Scotland
- Are You Smarter Than a 5th Grader?

| Preceded by Fourth grade | Fifth grade age 10–11 | Succeeded by Sixth grade |
