= National 3 =

National 3 may refer to:

- National 3 (Scottish educational qualification), an educational qualification in Scotland and part of the larger Curriculum for Excellence
- Championnat National 3, French football league
