= SVQ =

SVQ may refer to:

- Scottish Vocational Qualification
- San Pablo Airport, Seville, Spain (IATA airport code)
- Sorenson Video Quantizer (also known as Sorenson codec), a digital video codec devised by the company Sorenson Media
- SVQ, a music file format for sequencers from Roland Corporation
