= Scottish Vocational Education Council =

Scottish Vocational Educational Council
- Abbreviation: SCOTVEC
- Merged into: Scottish Qualifications Authority
- Formation: 1985
- Dissolved: 28 November 1997; 28 years ago"The Scottish Examination Board and Scottish Vocational Education Council (Dissolution) (Scotland) Order 1997". Legislation.gov.uk. The National Archives.
- Merger of: Scottish Business Education Council and Scottish Technical Education Council
- Headquarters: Glasgow
- Region served: Scotland

The Scottish Vocational Educational Council (SCOTVEC) was the awarding body for vocational qualifications in Scotland from 1985 until 1997.

SCOTVEC was established by the merger of the Scottish Business Education Council (SCOTBEC) and the Scottish Technical Education Council (SCOTEC) in 1985. It awarded the vast majority of Scottish vocational qualifications. In 1997, SCOTVEC merged with its academic counterpart, the Scottish Examination Board, to form the Scottish Qualifications Authority.
