= Pamela Munn =

British academic researcher

Pamela Munn OBE
- Known for: Education research and reform

Pamela Munn OBE is an academic researcher and former Dean of the University of Edinburgh Moray House School of Education. She was awarded an OBE for services to education in Scotland in 2005. She is a former president of the British Educational Research Association (BERA) and is a member of the Academy of Social Sciences.

Munn was a member of national committees and policy reviews, including the Reference Group for the Donaldson Review of Teacher Education in Scotland 2010, the committee on Education for Citizenship in Scotland, the Curriculum Review Group, which established the principles underpinning Curriculum for Excellence and the Review of Initial Teacher Education. Munn retired from University of Edinburgh in 2010. She continues to contribute to national debates and policy making about the state of education in Scotland.
