= Modern Studies =

Scottish secondary school subject

Modern Studies is a subject in the Scottish school system, currently taught at National 3 through Advanced Higher. It concerns contemporary social and political issues, and political processes, in Scottish, UK and international contexts. The subject has been taught in Scotland since the 1960s and is credited with increasing students' political literacy.
