= Scottish Credit and Qualifications Framework =

Educational credit system in Scotland

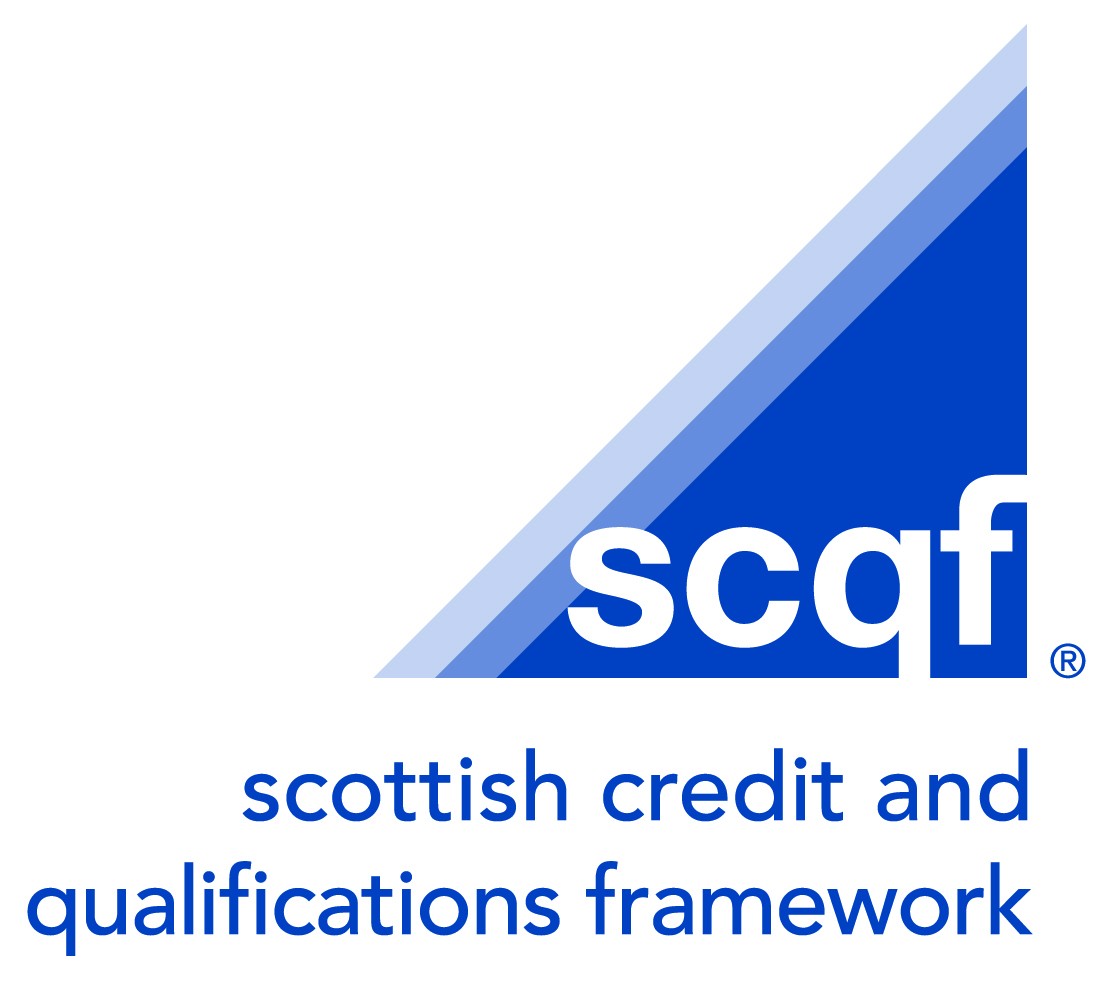
Logo

The Scottish Credit and Qualifications Framework (SCQF) helps people understand and compare the various types of learning and qualifications in Scotland. Each qualification is given an SCQF level between 1 and 12, with 12 being the most challenging. The time it takes to complete the qualification is measured in credit points, with one credit point equating to 10 hours of learning time. The SCQF helps people plan their future learning.

The SCQF is managed by the SCQF Partnership, a charity set up in 2006. The Partnership's primary role is to maintain the framework and SCQF Register. It also:

- provides advice on adding qualifications to the framework through the process of credit rating;
- provides guidance on Recognition of Prior Learning, which enables individuals to gain formal recognition for the skills, knowledge and experience they have already acquired;
- promotes lifelong learning;
- operates the School Ambassador Programme, which encourages schools to expand their curriculum by offering a greater range of qualifications;
- provides advice and guidance to other qualification systems around the world through its consultancy services and study visits.

The SCQF Partnership is governed by a board, whose members include the Scottish Qualifications Authority, Universities Scotland, the College Development Network, and the Quality Assurance Agency for Higher Education. There are also co-opted directors, including one representing employers and another who chairs the Partnership’s Quality Committee.

== Levels ==
The Framework has 12 levels.

SCQF Level	SQA National Units, Courses and Group Awards	Higher Education	Scottish Vocational Qualifications (SVQ)
12	Professional Development Award	Doctorates	Professional Apprenticeship
11	Professional Development Award	Master's degree, Integrated master's degree, Post Graduate Diploma, Post Graduate Certificate	Graduate Apprenticeship, Professional Apprenticeship, SVQ
10	Professional Development Award	Honours degree, Graduate diploma, Graduate Certificate	Graduate Apprenticeship, Professional Apprenticeship
9	Professional Development Award	Ordinary degree, Graduate Diploma, Graduate certificate	Graduate Apprenticeship, Technical Apprenticeship, SVQ
8	Professional Development Award	Higher National Diploma, Diploma of Higher Education	Higher Apprenticeship, Technical Apprenticeship, SVQ
7	Advanced Higher, Awards, Scottish Baccalaureate, Professional Development Award	Higher National Certificate, Certificate of Higher Education	Modern Apprenticeship, SVQ
6	Higher, Awards, Skills for Work Higher, National Certificate, National Progression Award, Professional Development Award		Modern Apprenticeship, Foundation Apprenticeship, SVQ
5	National 5, Awards, Skills for Work National 5, National Certificate, National Progression Award; Intermediate 2 (discontinued); Credit Standard Grade (discontinued)		Modern Apprenticeship, SVQ
4	National 4, Awards, Skills for Work National 4, National Certificate, National Progression Award; Intermediate 1 (discontinued); General Standard Grade (discontinued)		SVQ
3	National 3, Awards, Skills for Work National 3, National Certificate, National Progression Award; Access 3 (discontinued); Foundation Standard Grade (discontinued)		
2	National 2, Awards, National Certificate, National Progression Award; Access 2 (discontinued)		
1	National 1, Awards; Access 1 (discontinued)		

== Credit points ==
Each qualification is assigned credit points. To earn a qualification, a set number of credit points must be completed (see table below). One credit represents around 10 hours of learning, whether that's in the classroom or through independent study.

The Scottish credit point requirements can be converted into European Credit Transfer and Accumulation System (ECTS) credit points as follows, or by simply halving the Scottish values to arrive at the European equivalent:

Award	Usual SCQF credit points	ECTS equivalent
Master's degree (non-integrated with undergraduate)	180	90
Postgraduate diploma	120	60
Postgraduate certificate	40	20
Honours degree	480	240
Ordinary degree	360	180
Graduate diploma	120	60
Graduate certificate	60	30

Entry requirements at institutions are usually expressed in terms of both points and level, e.g. "a points at b level".

Credit points obtained from study at lower levels can be counted towards a qualification, whether by study within the institution or by awarding through transfer, but this is at the discretion of the awarding institution.

Credit values may differ for medical, veterinary and dental science degrees and certain undergraduate and postgraduate combined study (integrated masters).

== Background ==
Scottish higher education institutions had long used the SCOTCAT (Scottish Credit Accumulation and Transfer) system for equating courses from different institutions. SCOTCAT had three levels. Level 1 was equivalent to university first year, an HNC or a Certificate of Higher Education (Cert HE). Level 2 was equivalent to university second year, an HND or a Diploma of Higher Education. Level 3 was equivalent to years three and four at a Scottish University, and generally these credits lead to a Special or Honours Degree.

Following the creation of the Scottish Qualifications Authority by the merger of the Scottish Examinations Board and SCOTVEC, efforts were made to unite the different levels of vocational and academic qualifications. The aim was to make it easier for employers and education institutions to understand the level to which a person had been educated. A secondary aim was to remove prejudice against vocational and non-traditional qualifications.

Education and training providers in Scotland then agreed to create a common framework for all qualifications, both current and historical. This led to the development of a 12-level framework with courses, units, modules and clusters being placed at a specific level with a credit weighting.

Changes have been made to Higher Education level courses to prepare the Scottish system for the Bologna process.

== See also ==
- Education in Scotland
- Scottish Certificate of Education (until 1999)
- Scottish Qualifications Certificate (from 2000)
- Standard Grade (until 2013)
- SQA Higher
- SQA Advanced Higher
