= AEDIPS =

Association to support education in Scotland

AEDIPS, the Association of Educational Development and Improvement Professionals in Scotland was an association that supported the development of education in Scotland, with a particular focus on entitlement and quality.

Formerly known as the AEAS (the Association of Educational Advisers in Scotland), AEDIPS updated its name and constitution during their annual conference on the 4th of March 2005 . This was intended to reflect their change in focus, and to acknowledge the changing roles of professionals working in the areas of quality improvement, curriculum, and professional development in Scottish education. Furthermore, Tommy Docherty, the association's president at the time, stated at the conference this name change would help address the issue "that advisers had been virtually invisible in recent education debates and had to adopt a higher profile."

AEDIPS acted as a forum for approximately five hundred educational professionals that were newly supporting schools in all sectors of education in the areas of improvement, curriculum, and professional development in local authorities in Scotland. Membership of AEDIPS was open to permanent staff, secondees, consultants, and former improvement and development professionals who may have moved on from local authority work but wish to keep up with educational developments in Scotland.

A year later, at the AEDIPS 2006 Annual Conference on 24th February 2006, Boyd and Norris (2006) suggested that "Since the reorganisation of local government in 1996 and the establishment of the Scottish Parliament in 1999, the role of advisers in local authorities has changed significantly... and what has emerged was a range of issues relating to their changing role". And so, Brian Boyd (honorary president of the AEDIPS Scotland at the time), and Fiona Norris (a quality improvement officer and member of AEDIPS executive), were critical of the changes and responsibilities now faced by the members of AEDIPS.

In September 2012, the AEDIPS association was disbanded, citing that it was "no longer feasible to continue to operate as effectively as it would expect in the present financial and educational climate".
