= Education in Scotland =

- Logo of the Scottish Government

Education Scotland, an executive agency of the Scottish Government
- Cabinet Secretary for Education, Culture and Gaelic: Màiri McAllan MSP

National education budget
- Budget: £4.869bn (2024-2025)
- Per student: £3,855 (2004–2005)^{‡}

General details
- Primary languages: English, Scottish Gaelic, Scots
- System type: National
- Compulsory education: 1872

Enrollment (2005)
- Total: 1,452,240
- Primary: 390,260
- Secondary: 322,980
- Post secondary: 739,000^{#}
- ‡: Expenditure on pre-school, primary and secondary education only. #: 2004, All further and higher education institutions includes overseas students.

Education in Scotland is provided in state schools, private schools and by individuals through homeschooling. Mandatory education in Scotland begins for children in Primary 1 (P1) at primary school and ends in Sixth Year (S6) at secondary school.

Overall accountability and control of state–education in Scotland rests with the Scottish Government, and is overseen by two executive agencies – Education Scotland and His Majesty's Inspectorate of Education (HMIE), with additional responsibility for nursery schools being the joint responsibility of both together with the Care Inspectorate. Scotland's private schools are overseen by the Scottish Council of Independent Schools. Children in Scotland sit mandatory National Standardised Assessments in Primary 1 (P1), Primary 4 (P4), Primary 7 (P7) at the end of primary school, and Third Year (S3) in secondary school, which assist in monitoring children's progress and providing diagnostic data information to support teachers' professional judgement.

Each of Scotland's 32 local authorities have control over the provision of mandatory education and early learning and childcare (nursery education; not mandatory) in their area and have a statutory requirement to ensure pupils in each area receive adequate and efficient provision of school education. Each local authority has control over their own education budget and have responsibility to ensure that their local authority area is implementing national educational policy and guidelines as directed by the Scottish Government. When proposing a change to any aspect of education provision in their area, local authorities must engage in a formal process as required through the Schools (Consultation) (Scotland) Act 2010.

Education in Scotland has a history of universal provision of public education, and the Scottish education system is distinctly different from those in the other countries of the United Kingdom. The Scotland Act 1998 gives the Scottish Parliament legislative control over all education matters, and the Education (Scotland) Act 1980 is the principal legislation governing education in Scotland. Traditionally, the Scottish system at secondary school level has emphasised breadth across a range of subjects, while the English, Welsh and Northern Irish systems have emphasised greater depth of education over a smaller range of advanced subjects.

The Programme for International Student Assessment coordinated by the OECD in 2018 ranked Scotland as second out of four in the UK (after England) for reading with an average above the OECD average, while scoring third in the UK, and its results steadily dropping, in maths and science, scoring at OECD average.

The 2021 Nuffield report noted that "Scottish pupils start off strongly at a young age, but then quickly fall behind their UK peers, particularly in maths, which we know has been an issue that Scotland has had to grapple with for several years." In 2014, research by the Office for National Statistics found that Scotland was the most highly educated country in Europe and among the most well-educated in the world in terms of tertiary education attainment, above countries like Finland, Ireland and Luxembourg, with roughly 40% of Scots aged 16–64 educated to NVQ level 4 and above.

== History ==
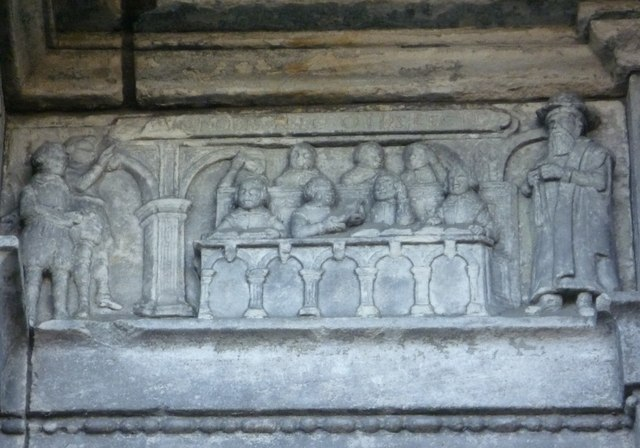
Carving of a 17th-century classroom with a dominie and his ten scholars from George Heriot's School, Edinburgh

The history of education in Scotland in its modern sense of organised and institutional learning, began in the Middle Ages, when Church choir schools and grammar schools began educating boys. By the end of the 15th century schools were also being organised for girls and universities were founded at St Andrews, Glasgow and Aberdeen. Education was encouraged by the Education Act 1496, which made it compulsory for the sons of barons and freeholders of substance to attend the grammar schools, which in turn helped increase literacy among the upper classes.

The Scottish Reformation resulted in major changes to the organisation and nature of education, with the loss of choir schools and the expansion of parish schools, along with the reform and expansion of the Universities. In the seventeenth century, legislation enforced the creation and funding of schools in every parish, often overseen by presbyteries of the local kirk. The existence of this network of schools later led to the growth of the "democratic myth" that poor boys had been able to use this system of education to rise to the top of Scottish society. However, Scotland's University system did help to make it one of the major contributors to the Enlightenment in the 18th century, producing major figures such as David Hume and Adam Smith.

Religious divisions and the impact of industrialisation, migration and immigration disrupted the existing educational system and in the late nineteenth century it was reorganised and expanded to produce a state-funded national system of free basic education and common examinations. The reform of Scottish universities made them major centres of learning and pioneers in the admission of women from 1892. In the 20th century Scottish secondary education expanded, particularly for girls, but the universities began to fall behind those in England and Europe in investment and expansion of numbers. The government of the education system became increasingly centred on Scotland, with the final move of the ministry of education to Edinburgh in 1939. After devolution in 1999 the Scottish Executive also created an Enterprise, Transport and Lifelong Learning Department and there was significant divergence from practice in England, including the abolition of student tuition fees at Scottish universities.

== Provision of education in Scotland ==
=== Stages of compulsory education ===
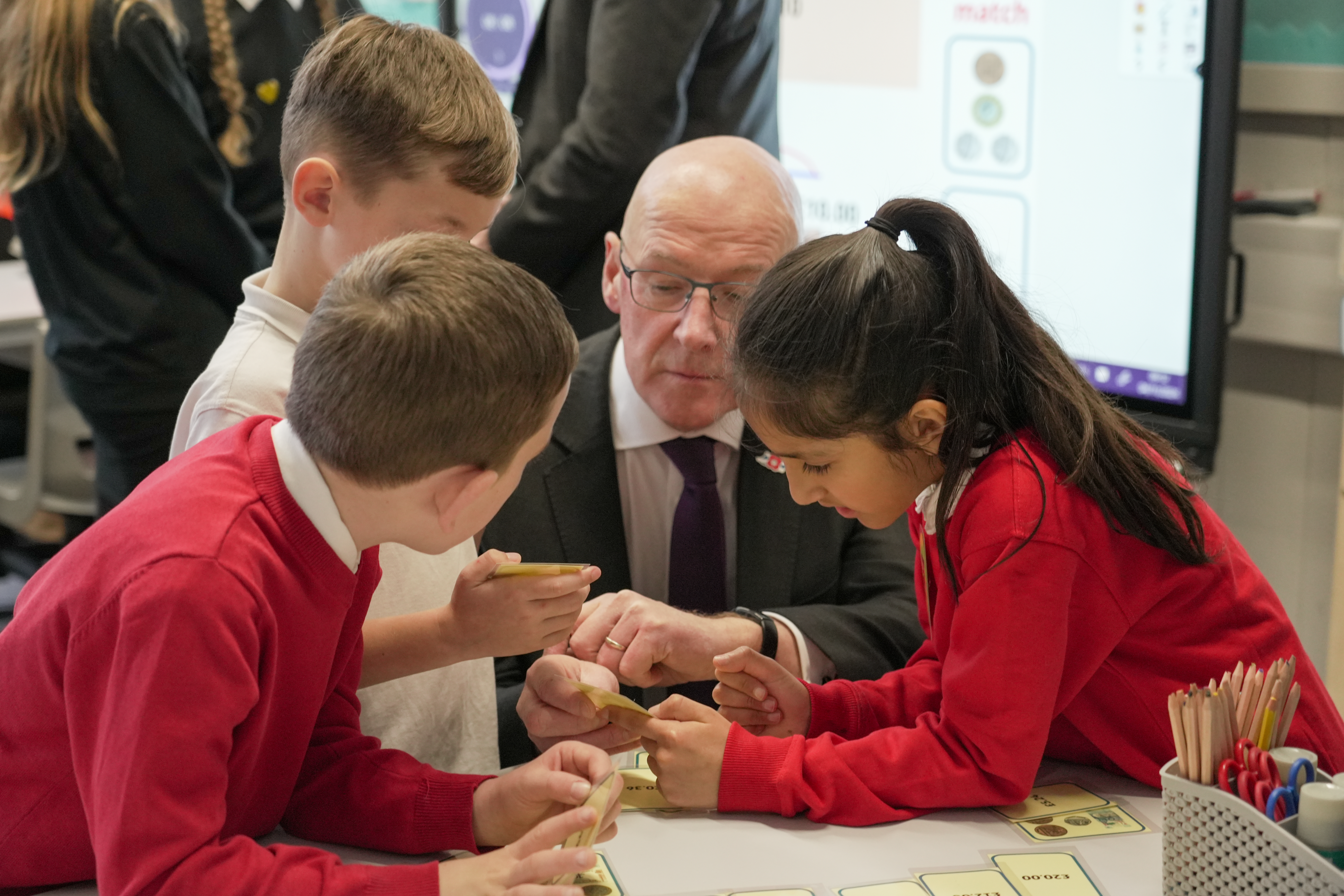
First Minister John Swinney with pupils at Ayr Grammar Primary School during a Scottish Cabinet travelling engagement

Children start primary school aged between 4½ and 5½ depending on when the child's birthday falls. Scottish school policy places all those born between March of a given year and February of the following year in the same year group. Children born between March and August start school in August at between 5 and 5½ years old, and those born between September and February start school in the previous August at between age 4½ and 4 years 11 months years old. The Scottish system is the most flexible in the UK, however, as parents of children born between September and December can decide to defer for 1 year (but may or may not receive a funded nursery place in the deferral year), whilst children born between January and February can opt to hold their child back a year and let them start school the following August, with guaranteed nursery funding. This usually allows those not ready for formal education to have an extra year at an early years centre (formerly known as nursery).

Pupils remain at primary school for seven years. Then aged eleven or twelve, they start secondary school for a compulsory four years with the following two years being optional. In Scotland, pupils sit National 4/5 exams (previously Standard Grade or Intermediate exams) at the age of fifteen/sixteen, normally for between 6 and eight subjects including compulsory exams in English and Mathematics. A Science subject (Physics, Biology or Chemistry) and a Social Subject (Geography, History or Modern Studies) were also compulsory, but this was changed in accordance with the new curriculum. It is now required by the Scottish Parliament for students to have two hours of physical education a week; each school may vary these compulsory combinations. The school leaving age is generally sixteen (after completion of National 4/5s), after which students may choose to remain at school and study for Higher and/or Advanced Higher exams.

A small number of students at certain private schools may follow the English system and study towards GCSE instead of National 4/5s (Standard Grades), and towards A and AS-Levels instead of (or alongside) Higher Grade and Advanced Higher exams. The International Baccalaureate has also been introduced in some independent schools.

The table below lists rough equivalences with the year system in the rest of the United Kingdom (For England and Wales, the equivalence given is for children born before 1 September; the equivalence for those born from September to February [December for deferred pupils] is given in brackets):

Scotland	Age at start of school year	Age at end of school year	England and Wales	Northern Ireland
Nursery	3–4	4–5	Nursery	Nursery
P1 (P = Primary)	4–5	5–6	Reception	P1
P2	5–6	6–7	Year 1	P2
P3	6–7	7–8	Year 2	P3
P4	7–8	8–9	Year 3	P4
P5	8–9	9–10	Year 4	P5
P6	9–10	10–11	Year 5	P6
P7	10–11	11–12	Year 6 & 7	P7
S1 (First year) (S= Secondary)	11–12	12–13	Year 7 & 8	Year 8 (1st Year)
S2 (Second year)	12–13	13–14	Year 8 & 9	Year 9 (2nd Year)
S3 (Third year)	13–14	14–15	Year 9 & 10	Year 10 (3rd Year)
S4 (Fourth year)	14–15	15–16	Year 10 & 11	Year 11 (4th Year)
S5 (Fifth year)	15–16	16–17	Year 11 & 12 (Lower Sixth Form)	Year 12 (5th Year)
S6 (Sixth year)	16–17	17–18	Year 12 & 13 (Upper Sixth Form)	Year 13 (Lower 6th)
	n/a	n/a	Year 13 (Upper Sixth Form)	Year 14 (Upper 6th)

=== Access to education ===
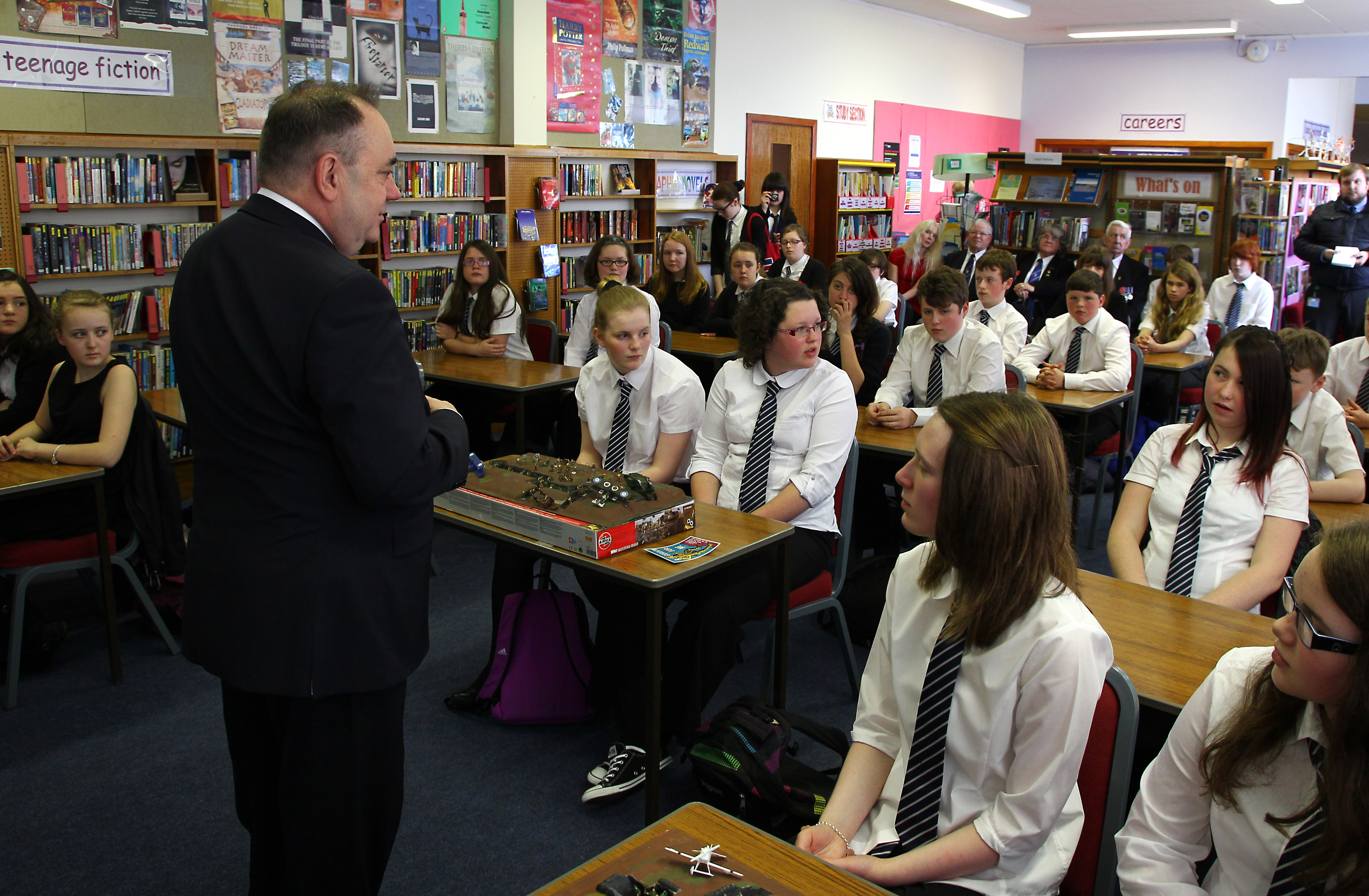
First Minister Alex Salmond visits a classroom at Turriff Academy.

Government funded schools are free for children aged 5–19. In many cases, this applies to children of international post-graduate students, and other immigrants.

The age ranges specify the youngest age for a child entering that year and the oldest age for a child leaving that year. Playgroup can be described as a daycare centre for toddlers, then children may go on to attend an early years centre as soon as they have passed their third birthday, and progress to Primary 1 in the August of the year in which they turn five. In general, the cut-off point for ages is the end of February, so all children must be of a certain age on 1 March to begin class in August. All parents of children born between September and February (i.e. still 4 years old on the school start date) are entitled to defer entry to Primary School if they believe their child is not ready for school. Only children whose birthdays fall in January or February will be considered for funding for a subsequent year at an early years centre, unless there are special circumstances.

Children may leave school once they reach their statutory school leaving date; this is dependent on date of birth. For children born between 1 March and 30 September, this date is 31 May of their 4th year of secondary school. For children born between 1 October and 28 February, the last day of June is the first date they may leave school if they have a placement at college and the school have signed the health & safety forms. Which high school the children go to depends on the area where they live, known as the "catchment area", which has a specific high school that takes children who live in that area. Parents can also apply for a placement request if they would like their child to attend a school outside their catchment area and a panel will decide if the child is the most worthy (out of all placing requests) to take one of the spaces left after all children from the catchment area have been taken.

Access to secondary school education in Scotland's island communities can be complex. Due to lower population numbers in some of Scotland's island settlements, not every island community can have a secondary school given low pupil numbers and the financial strain this can present by having a secondary school open and operational for what, in some cases, can be a lower than average pupil roll. In some areas, pupils attending secondary school are required to travel from island communities to the mainland for access to secondary education, with children residing in residential accommodation (also called hostels) on the mainland during the school term to avoid having to make lengthy travel back to their island communities. The Scottish Government has pledged to ensure that "island students be put on an equal platform with their counterparts from the mainland".

The table below lists the numbers of children, schools and teachers in all publicly funded schools:

	Children	Schools	Teachers	Early Years Practitioners	pupil:teacher ratio
Nursery	102,871	2,504	1,288	23,400	79.9
Primary	377,372	2,056	22,905	N/a	16.5
Secondary	289,164	364	23,695	N/a	12.2
Special	6,984	149	2,020	N/a	3.5

=== Home education ===
Home education is also legal in Scotland. Parents wishing to home educate do not need the permission of the Local Authority unless the children are already registered at a school. There are no exact numbers available for children being educated at home in Scotland.

=== Qualifications and assessments ===
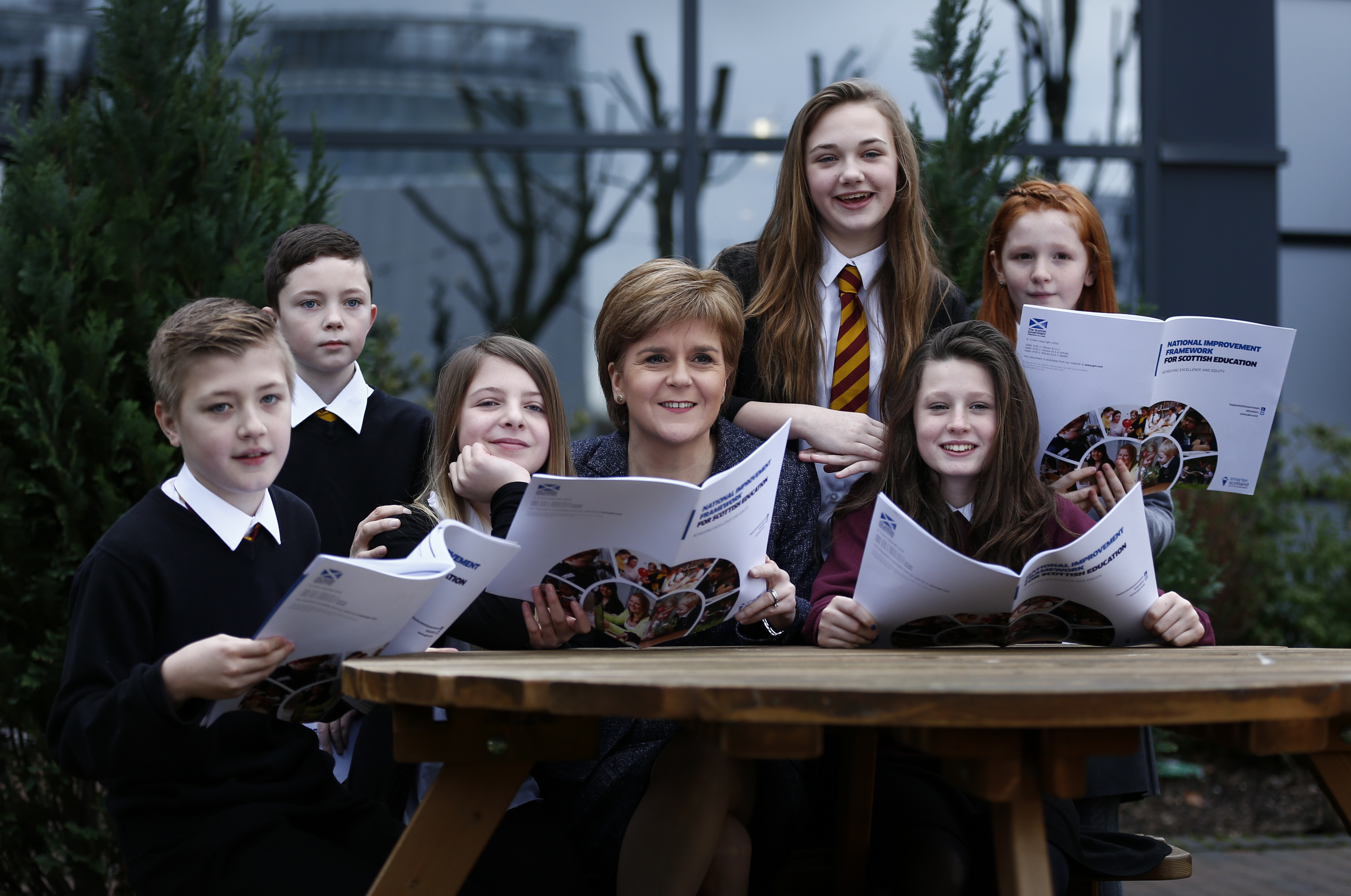
First Minister Nicola Sturgeon with pupils, launching the National Improvement Framework which also conducted a review of national standardised assessments in Scottish schools

All educational qualifications in Scotland are part of the Scottish Credit and Qualifications Framework, ranging between Scottish Qualifications Authority qualifications, Scottish Vocational Qualifications and higher education qualifications. Pupils in Primary 1, Primary 4 and Primary 7 at primary school sit a set of national standardised assessments, with secondary pupils sitting the national standardised assessments in S3 in literacy, reading and numeracy. The assessments provided data and information to track pupils progress in education and allows the Scottish Government to collate data across Scotland regarding educational performance.

The National Improvement Framework for Scottish Education was launched to ensure that children and young people in Scottish education experience a range of opportunities to learn and develop skills and capacities and ensuring that children and young people experience a broad general education. The National Improvement Framework document highlighted six key drivers for improvement in Scottish education; School and Early Learning and Childcare leadership, teacher and Early Years Practitioner professionalism, parental/carer involvement and engagement, curriculum and assessment, school and Early Learning and Childcare improvement and performance information.

Progression in Qualifications

S4	S5	S6
National 3	National 4	National 5
National 4	National 5	Higher
National 5	Higher	Advanced Higher

The vast majority of Scottish pupils take Scottish Qualifications Certificate qualifications provided by the Scottish Qualifications Authority (SQA). Generally, most pupils take National 4/5s (previously Standard Grades, but some schools offered Intermediates instead) in S3-S4, and Highers in S5. The number of National 4/5 qualifications a pupil enters can vary drastically depending on the individual, with the most common number of National 5s taken, per pupil, in 2017 being 6, however some may choose to undertake as few as one or two, up to eight or nine. For those who wish to remain at school for the final year (S6), more Highers and Advanced Highers (formerly CSYS) in S6 can be taken. Previous qualifications Intermediate 1 and Intermediate 2 – were intended to be roughly equivalent to General and Credit Level Standard Grades respectively.

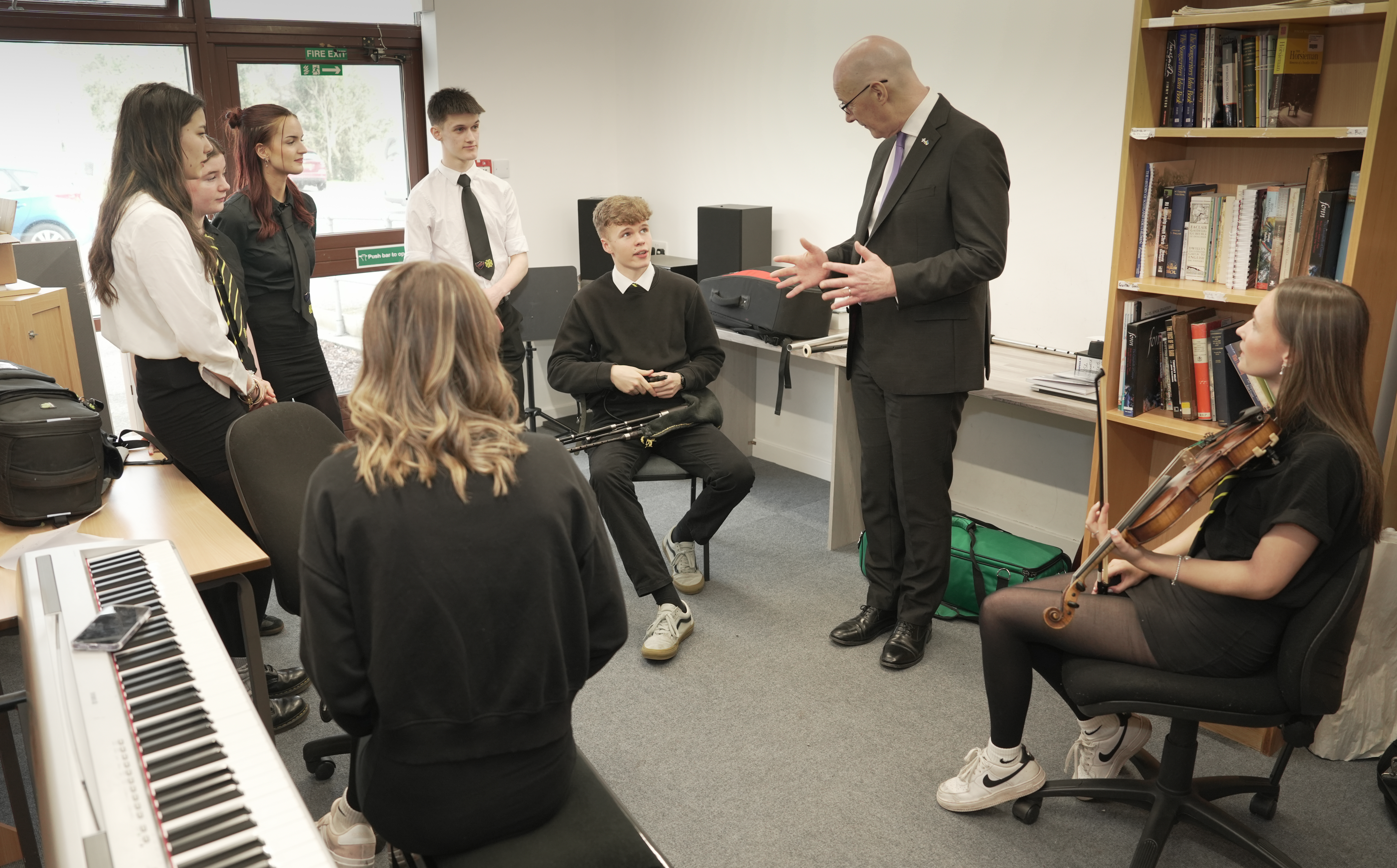
First Minister John Swinney with pupils at the National Centre of Excellence in Traditional Music in Scotland

Pupils can go to university at the end of S5, as Highers provide the entry requirements for Scottish universities where degrees are normally four years long; however, recently it is more common for students to remain until S6, taking further Highers and/or taking Advanced Highers. The majority of English universities, the most popular choice for Scottish students who wish to study university degrees outside of Scotland, require Advanced Higher qualification levels as these are deemed by the English universities to be most similar to A-levels.

Scottish universities generally have courses a year longer (typically 4 years) than their counterparts elsewhere in the UK, though it is often possible for students to take more advanced specialised exams and join the courses at the second year. One unique aspect is that the ancient universities of Scotland issue a Master of Arts as the first degree in humanities. State schools are owned and operated by the local authorities which act as Education Authorities, and the compulsory phase is divided into primary school and secondary school (often called high school). Schools are supported in delivering learning and teaching by Education Scotland (formerly Learning and Teaching Scotland). There are also private schools across the country, although the distribution is uneven with such schools in 22 of the 32 Local Authority areas. At September 2011 the total pupil population in Scotland was 702,104, of which 31,425 pupils, or 4.5%, were being educated in independent schools.

Qualifications at the secondary school and post-secondary (further education) level are provided by the Scottish Qualifications Authority, which is the national awarding and accrediting body in Scotland, and delivered through various schools, colleges and other centres. Political responsibility for education at all levels is vested in the Scottish Parliament and the Learning Directorate. Inspections and audits of educational standards are conducted by three bodies: Care Inspectorate inspects care standards in pre-school provision; Education Scotland (formerly Her Majesty's Inspectorate of Education) for pre-school, primary, education, further and community education; with the Scottish office of the Quality Assurance Agency for Higher Education (QAA Scotland) responsible for higher education.

=== National Curriculum ===
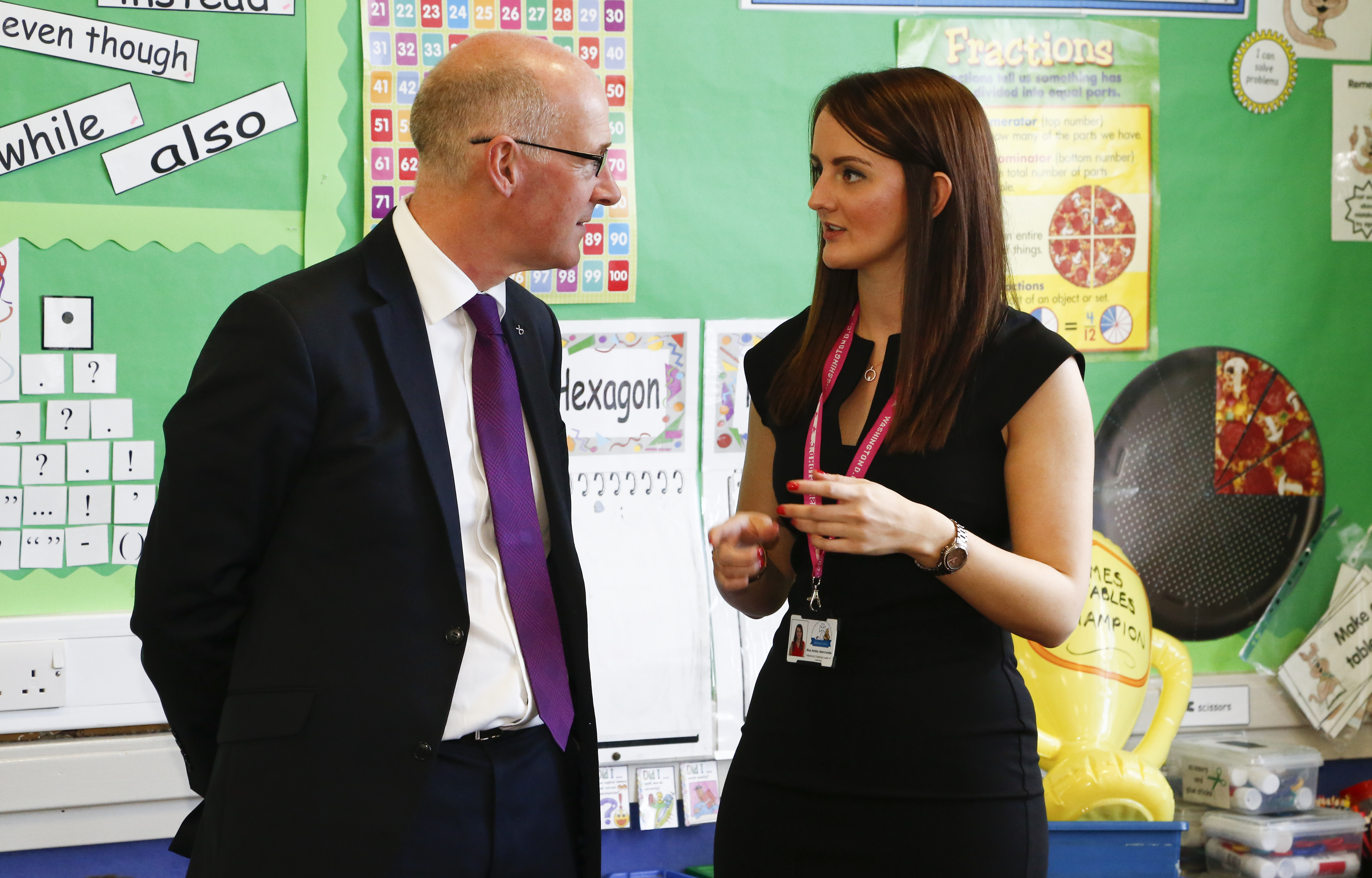
A review of Curriculum for Excellence gave powers to teachers to remove unnecessary bureaucracy.

Unlike England's nationally followed National Curriculum, Scotland had no national standards for some time. In 2003, work began on an education reform programme, to produce a new Curriculum for Excellence that would replace existing guidance on the school curriculum. Curriculum for Excellence was launched in Scottish secondary schools from school session 2012–2013. In 2017, new reforms were introduced moving control over curriculum and schools more towards head teachers and parents. Additional recommendations were made regarding the level of bureaucracy attached to Curriculum for Excellence that had been raised by teachers and Early Years Practitioners as a major problem with the curriculum. Following a review, in 2017, the Scottish Government introduced a new framework that would empower teachers and Early Years Practitioners to remove the unnecessary levels of bureaucracy that had been attached to Curriculum for Excellence, planning and evaluating for children's progress and learning and the paperwork involved in Scottish education as a whole. A number of third-sector and government-partnered organisations, such as SSERC, support the delivery of the Curriculum for Excellence through activities such as teaching resource creation and educator training programmes.

A review was undertaken by the OECD, having been commissioned by the Scottish Government to look at the broad general education.

=== Religion in schools ===
The majority of schools are non-denominational, and include the parish schools, pioneered by the Church of Scotland and other Protestant Churches, which became state schools in 1872. Religious education is taught in non-denominational schools and in denominational schools. Of over 2,500 schools in Scotland, there are 366 state schools which are Roman Catholic, three Episcopalian and one Jewish. The Education (Scotland) Act 1918 brought Roman Catholic schools within the State education system, ensuring the promotion of a Roman Catholic ethos within such schools.

== Governance and scrutiny ==
The Scottish Government is responsible for the education system in Scotland, and the country's education system is overseen by Education Scotland, an executive agency of the Scottish Government. The Cabinet Secretary for Education, Culture and Gaelic has overall responsibility for education provision in Scotland. The Cabinet Secretary is assisted by three junior ministers, currently the Minister for Childcare and Early Years, the Minister for Further Education, Higher Education and Science and the Minister for Employability and Training.

The Care Inspectorate regulates Early Learning and Childcare provision in Scotland, and publish their own independent inspection reviews of early years provision whilst liaising with His Majesty's Inspectorate of Education (HMIE) frequently to conduct a joint inspection process for stand alone nurseries (those not attached to a primary school). Nursery classes or early years centres attached to a primary school are inspected by HMIE as part of the primary school inspection. In addition to an inspection by HMIE inspectors, nursery classes and early years centres are also required to be inspected by the Care Inspectorate.

His Majesty's Inspectorate of Education (HMIE) is solely responsible for the inspection of Scotland's primary, secondary and additional support needs schools, and like the Care Inspectorate, can also produce their own independent inspection reviews of early learning and childcare establishments in Scotland.

=== Ministers responsible ===
Cabinet Secretaries and Ministers overseeing Education in Scotland
Portfolio	Minister	Image	Areas of Responsibility
Cabinet Secretary for Education, Culture and Gaelic	Màiri McAllan MSP		School Standards; Quality and Improvement; School Infrastructures and Staffing; Educational Attainment; Qualifications; Teaching profession Behaviour and anti-bullying measures Named Person and Looked After policies Youth Work; Early Years Education; Children's Services; Children's hearing
Minister for Children, Young People and the Promise	Siobhian Brown MSP		Adoption and fostering Early Years; Childcare; Child Protection; Children's Rights; Looked After Children; Protection of Vulnerable Groups; Social Services Workforce
Minister for Innovation, Technology and Tertiary Education	Alyn Smith MSP		Further education Colleges; Universities; Student Funding; STEM Subjects; Widening access

== Secondary schools ==
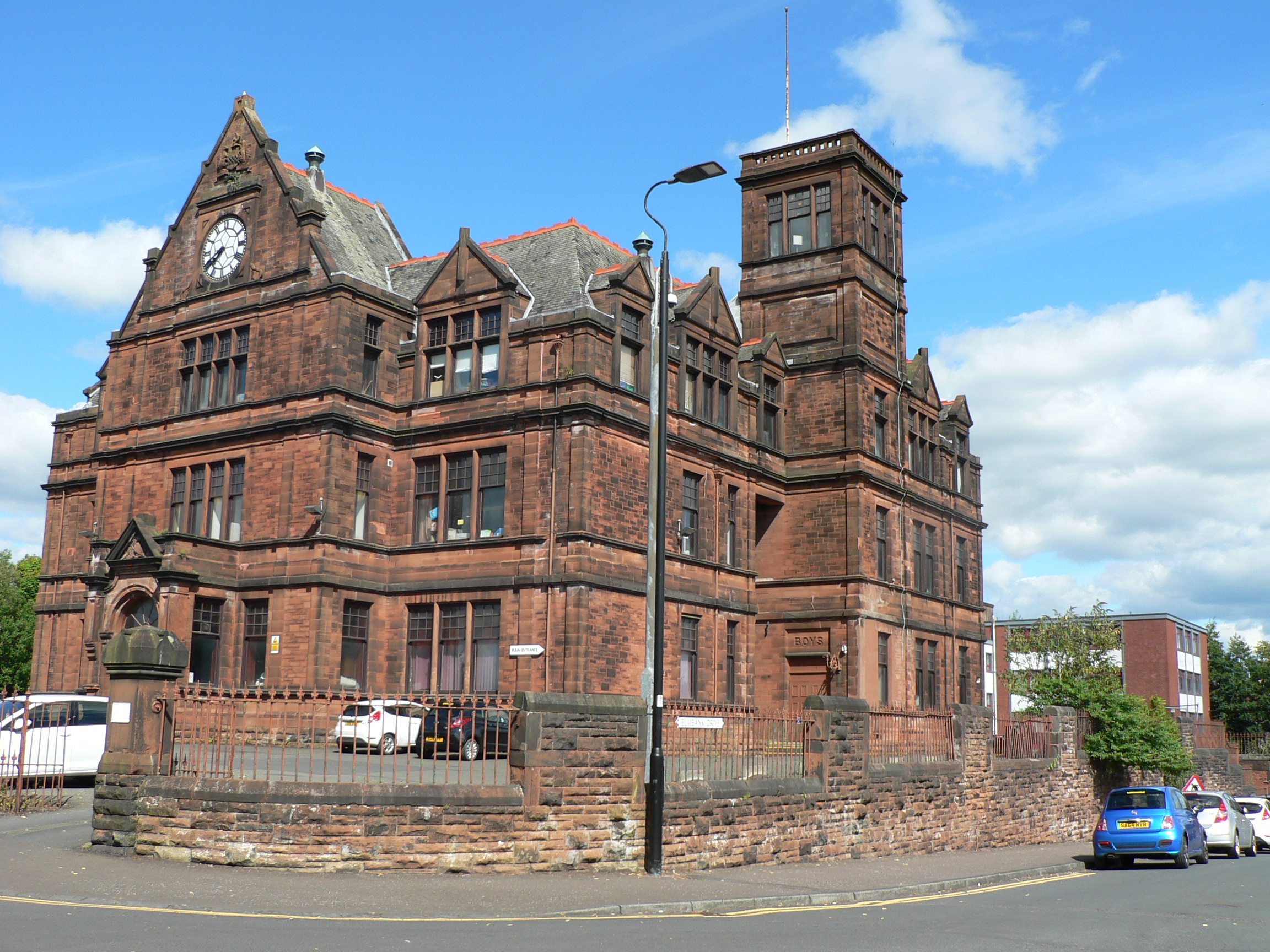
Kilmarnock Academy is the only school in Scotland to have educated two Nobel Prize Laureates.

Secondary education is provided by secondary schools throughout Scotland, both in the state and independent sector. The vast majority of schools in the state sector are administered directly by the local Education Authority, which is synonymous with the 32 councils used for local government.

There are three broad classifications of schools in Scotland:

- State-funded schools: These are schools under the management of an education authority. These schools do not charge fees to attend and have no entrance restrictions. Both denominational and non-denominational schools fall within this category. In the Education (Scotland) Act 1980 they are also referred to as 'public schools' (not to be confused with the other meaning of public school in England and Wales).
- Grant-Aided schools: Grant-Aided schools are independent of their education authority and can decide on their own governance, but are directly funded by the Scottish Ministers. There is one mainstream Grant-Aided school in Scotland, Jordanhill School, formerly linked to Jordanhill College of Education. The remaining seven Grant-Aided schools are special schools, which are Capability Scotland: Corseford School, Capability Scotland: Stanmore House School, Donaldson's School, East Park School, Harmeny School, the Royal Blind School and the Scottish Centre for Children with Motor Impairments (Craighalbert Centre). Despite their status, several of these schools are members of the Scottish Council of Independent Schools.
- Independent schools: Independent schools are schools that are not under management of an education authority and do not receive direct state funding. To qualify as a school, it must provide full-time education for at least five pupils of school age. Schools of this type are required to register and are subject to inspections by Education Scotland. Most are members of the Scottish Council of Independent Schools. One independent school, St Mary's Music School, receives Aided Places (similar to the abolished Assisted Places Scheme) where fees can be paid by the Scottish Ministers.

=== School naming ===
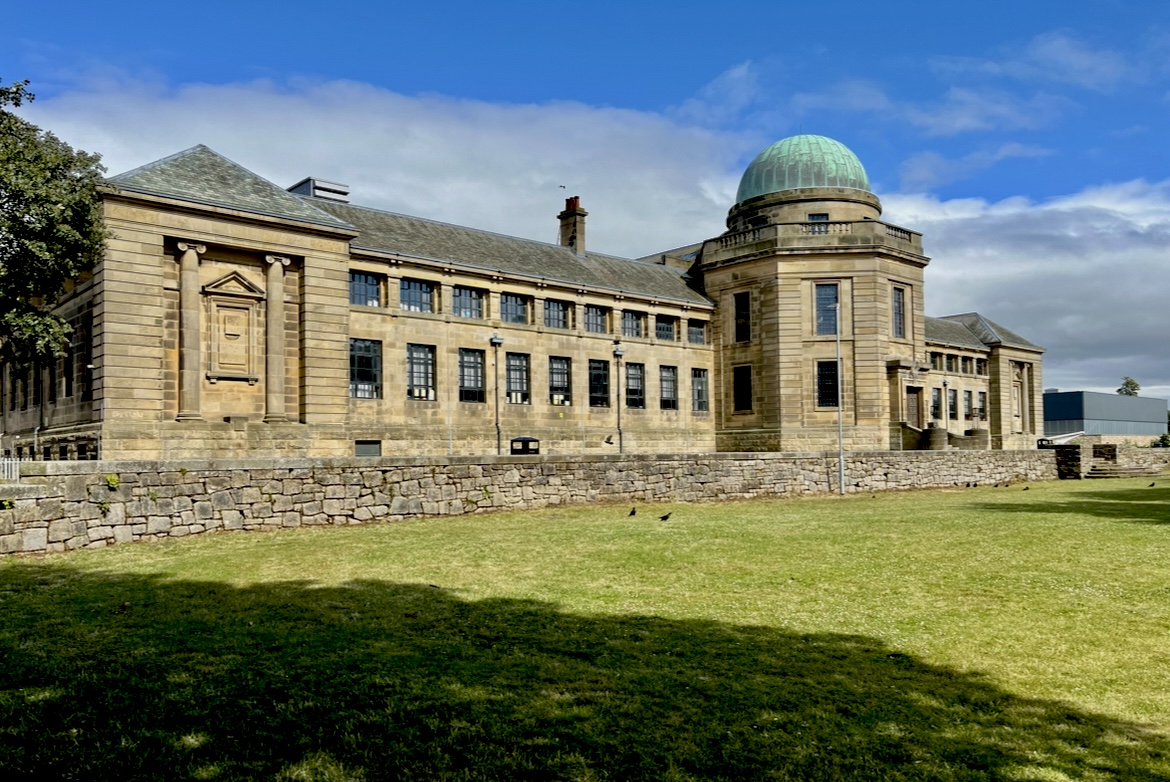
Marr College in Troon, South Ayrshire, carries the name College rather than High School or Academy.

There is not a set name for secondary schools in Scotland, but whatever they might be called, with just a few specific exceptions in mainly rural or island authorities, state secondary schools in Scotland are fully comprehensive and non-selective. Amongst the state-run secondary schools:

- 188 are nominally High Schools. These are spread across the country. Almost all Catholic secondaries are high schools, with the majority of the other names being non-denominational schools.
- 131 are nominally Academies. These are spread across the country but are in high concentration in North-East Scotland, Ayrshire and Galloway, an example is Banchory Academy. There are also three Royal Academies, in Irvine, North Ayrshire; Tain; and Inverness.
- 15 are nominally Secondary Schools (colloquially abbreviated to "secondaries"). These are found mostly in Glasgow.
- 14 are nominally Grammar Schools. Most of these schools were defined as grammar schools under a previous (now dissolved) system but their names remain. Popular areas for grammar schools are Argyll and Bute, East Lothian and South Lanarkshire.
- 13 are simply Schools. These schools cater for Primary as well as Secondary school children. They are found in rural areas or islands.
- 8 are Junior High Schools. These schools are found exclusively in the Orkney and Shetland Islands. They cater for school children from P1 to S4.
- 4 are Colleges. These include Madras College (in St Andrews, Fife), Marr College (in Troon, South Ayrshire) and St Joseph's College (in Dumfries, Dumfries and Galloway).

Other schools include The Community School of Auchterarder, Auchterarder, Perth and Kinross; The Nicolson Institute, Stornoway, Western Isles and North Walls Community School on Hoy, Orkney Islands. All of these are, equally, fully comprehensive non-selective schools, differing only in designation from all other state secondary schools in Scotland.

== Attainment ==
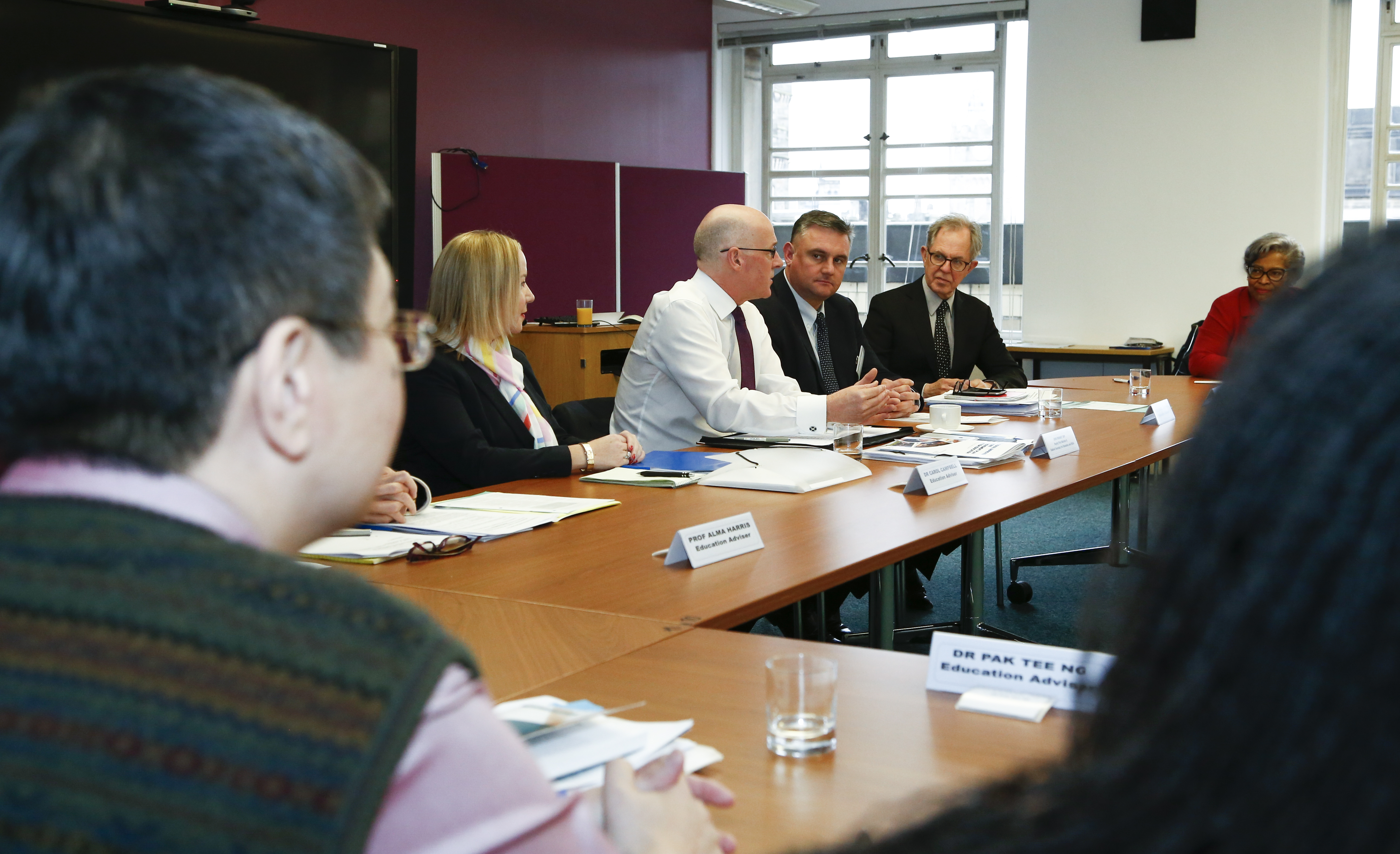
Deputy First Minister John Swinney chairs a meeting of the International Council of Education Advisers.

In 2015, the Scottish Government launched the Scottish Attainment Challenge which aims to achieve equity in educational outcomes throughout Scotland. The Scottish Government envisages equity being achieved by ensuring every child has the same opportunity to succeed, with a particular focus on closing the poverty-related attainment gap. It is underpinned by national Scottish educational policies such as Curriculum for Excellence, Getting it Right for Every Child (GIRFEC) as well as the National Improvement Framework. The attainment challenge focuses and accelerates targeted improvement activity in literacy, numeracy and health and wellbeing in specific areas of Scotland, known as "challenge authorities" (those councils with a higher percentage of children growing up in poverty and deprivation). At a cost of £750 million to the Scottish Government through the Attainment Scotland Fund, the challenge is a targeted initiative focused on supporting pupils in the local authorities of Scotland with the highest concentrations of deprivation. Currently, the nine 'Challenge Authorities' are Glasgow City Council, Dundee City Council, Inverclyde, West Dunbartonshire, North Ayrshire, Clackmannanshire, North Lanarkshire, East Ayrshire and Renfrewshire.

On 1 February 2017 the share each primary and secondary school will receive for the academic year 2017–2018 from the Scottish Government's £120 million Pupil Equity Funding was announced by the Deputy First Minister and Cabinet Secretary for Education and Skills John Swinney. This funding is provided through the Attainment Scotland Fund and allocated directly to schools, targeted at those children most affected by the poverty related attainment gap.

=== Literacy and numeracy ===
The SNP-led government launched the Scottish Survey of Literacy and Numeracy in 2011. The survey showed a sustained decline in basic literacy and numeracy among school pupils over six years. It was then scrapped by the government and its measures of literacy were replaced in part with a system based on teacher judgements. The teacher judgement data from December 2018 indicated that 70% of pupils achieved the expected literacy level by the end of primary school.

The government withdrew Scotland from the Progress in International Reading Literacy Study in 2010, making international comparisons of literacy difficult. It remains part of the Programme for International Student Assessment, which shows that Scotland's international standing in reading and mathematics (as well as science) in schools fell between the first decade of the century and 2018.

The Scottish Survey of Adult Literacies in 2009 reported that 26.7% of adults in Scotland "may face occasional challenges and constrained opportunities due to their literacy difficulties, but will generally cope with their day-to-day lives". Of that group, 3.6% "face serious challenges in their literacy practices".

=== Music education ===
Music education is available at several levels. Formal music education begins at 4½ years and can progress as high as postgraduate studies. Music education can take place within a Scottish Music school; through a music service or privately.

=== Scottish Gaelic medium education ===
Some schools in Scotland provide education given in the Scottish Gaelic language. They are mainly located in the main cities of Scotland and in areas with higher numbers of Gaelic speakers. Gaelic medium education is becoming increasingly popular throughout Scotland, and the number of pupils who are in Gaelic medium education at primary school level has risen from 24 in 1985, to 2500 in the 2012–13 school year.

== Further education ==
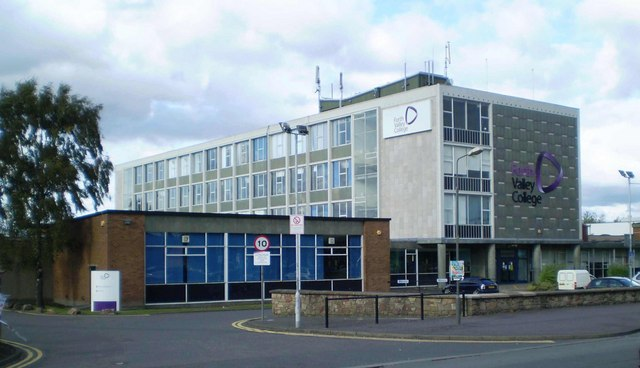
Forth Valley College gives HNC and vocational courses.

Further education is provided through a network of further education colleges available to people having reached the end of compulsory education at 16. In the early 2010s, colleges were merged to form larger, regional institutions.

Colleges offer a wide range of vocational qualifications to young people and older adults, including vocational, competency-based qualifications (previously known as SVQs), Higher National Certificates and Higher National Diplomas. In Scotland, FE college students receiving certain qualifications – frequently HNC and HND qualifications in a relevant subject – can apply for entry at a later stage at university.

Further education colleges also provide support to apprenticeship programmes, which are coordinated by the public body Skills Development Scotland.

== Higher education ==
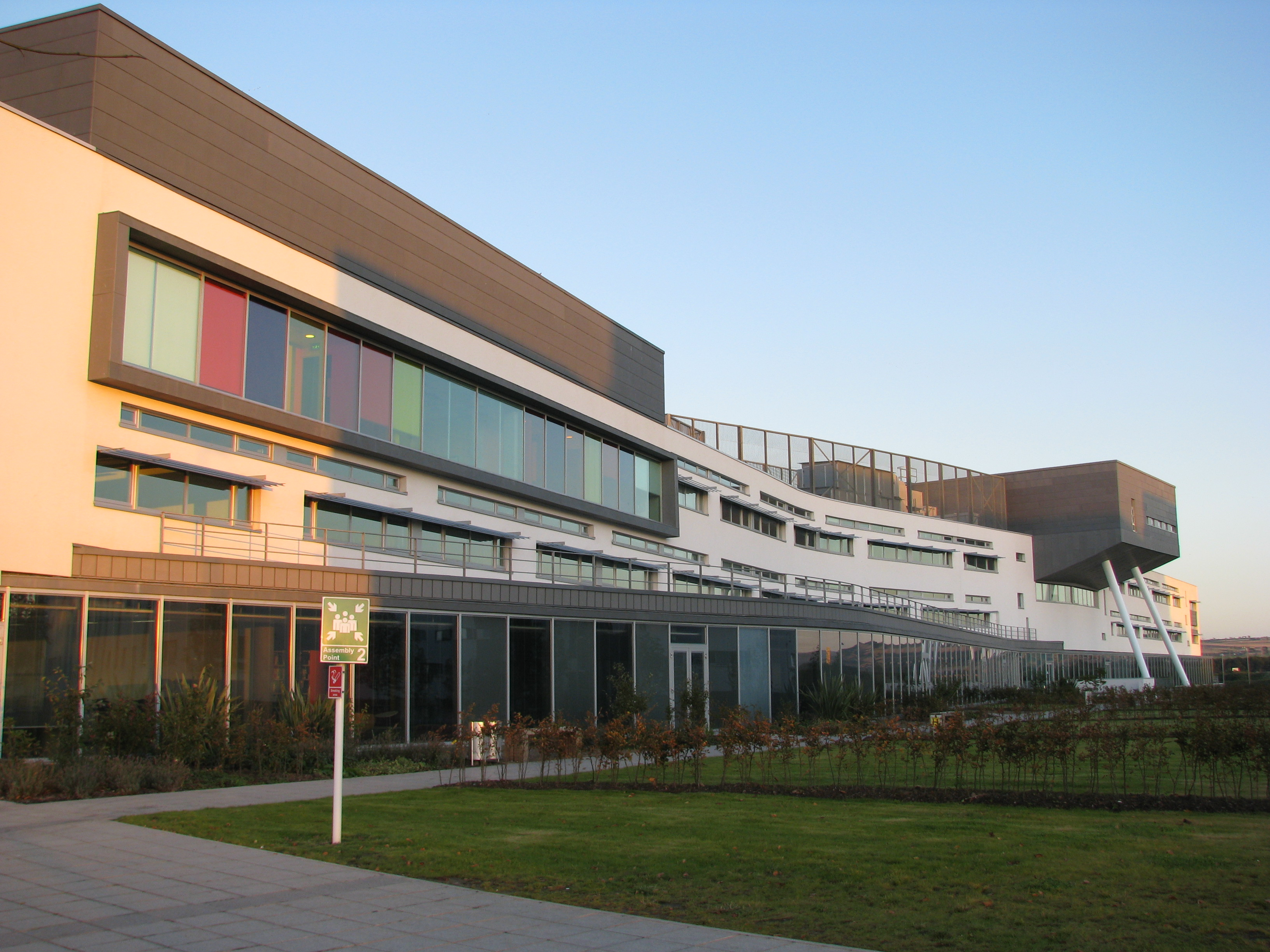
The Main Building of Queen Margaret University

There are fifteen universities in Scotland and three other institutions of higher education which have the authority to award academic degrees. The oldest is St. Andrews, which was founded in 1413. Three other "ancient universities", Glasgow, Aberdeen and Edinburgh, date from before 1600. The University of the Highlands and Islands (UHI) gained full university status in 2011, having been created through the federation of 13 colleges and research institutions across the Highlands and Islands, a process that began in 2001.

All Scottish universities have the power to award degrees at all levels: undergraduate, taught postgraduate, and doctoral. Education in Scotland is controlled by the Scottish Government under the terms of the Scotland Act 1998. The minister responsible for higher education is the Cabinet Secretary for Education and Skills, currently Jenny Gilruth MSP of the Scottish National Party. University status in Scotland and throughout the United Kingdom today is conferred by the Privy Council which takes advice from the Quality Assurance Agency for Higher Education.

All Scottish universities are public universities and funded by the Scottish Government (through its Scottish Funding Council) and financial support is provided for Scottish-domiciled students by the Student Awards Agency for Scotland. Students ordinarily resident in Scotland do not pay tuition fees for their first undergraduate degree, but tuition fees are charged for those from the rest of the United Kingdom. All students are required to pay tuition fees for postgraduate education (e.g. MSc, PhD), except in certain priority areas funded by the Scottish Government, or if another source of funding can be found (e.g. research council studentship for a PhD). A representative body called Universities Scotland works to promote Scotland's universities, as well as six other higher education institutions.

The university sector in Scotland had a total income of £3.5 billion in 2014/15 with the Scottish Government giving approximately £623 million in funding for individual university student support. The Scottish Funding Council contributing £1.1 billion of public money to the fifteen universities, this was a six per cent reduction since 2010/11.

In 2014–15, approximately 232,570 students studied at universities or institutes of higher education in Scotland, of which 56% were female and 44% male, with 66% being domiciled in Scotland, 12% from the rest of the United Kingdom, 9% from the EU and the remaining 13% being international students. Of all these, approximately 76% were studying for their first degree (i.e. undergraduate level) and 24% for a taught postgraduate degree (primarily a master's degree) or a doctoral research degree (primarily PhD). The remainder were mostly on other programmes such as Higher National Diploma. 16,000 students were studying in Scotland with The Open University via distance-learning, and the Open University teaches 40 per cent of Scotland's part-time undergraduates.

In the 2019 QS World University Rankings, three Scottish universities are among the top 100 worldwide: University of Edinburgh (at 18), University of Glasgow (at 69), University of St. Andrews (at 97). Other high ranked universities are the University of Aberdeen (at 172), University of Strathclyde (at 268), University of Dundee (at 272), Heriot-Watt University (at 302) and University of Stirling (at 417).

Tuition fees are handled by the Student Awards Agency Scotland (SAAS), which pays the fees of what it defines as "Young Students". Young Students are defined as those under 25, without children, marriage, civil partnership or cohabiting partner, who have not been outside of full-time education for more than three years. Fees must be paid by those outside the young student definition, typically from £1,200 to £1,800 for undergraduate courses, dependent on year of application and type of qualification. Postgraduate fees can be up to £3,400. The system has been in place since 2007 when graduate endowments were abolished. Labour's education spokesperson Rhona Brankin criticised the Scottish system for failing to address student poverty.

Scotland's universities are complemented in the provision of Further and Higher Education by 43 colleges. Colleges offer National Certificates, Higher National Certificates, and Higher National Diplomas. These Group Awards, alongside Scottish Vocational Qualifications, aim to ensure Scotland's population has the appropriate skills and knowledge to meet workplace needs. In 2014, research reported by the Office for National Statistics found that Scotland was the most highly educated country in Europe and among the most well-educated in the world in terms of tertiary education attainment, with roughly 40% of people in Scotland aged 16–64 educated to NVQ level 4 and above. Based on the original data for EU statistical regions, all four Scottish regions ranked significantly above the European average for completion of tertiary-level education by 25- to 64-year-olds.

== See also ==
- List of schools in Scotland
- List of independent schools in Scotland
- Home education in the United Kingdom
- Music schools in Scotland
- Association of Educational Development and Improvement Professionals
- List of further education colleges in Scotland
- Her Majesty's Inspectorate of Education (Scotland)
