= Religious, Moral and Philosophical Studies =

School subject taught in Scotland

Religious, Moral and Philosophical Studies (RMPS) is a national qualification subject offered by the Scottish Qualifications Authority. RMPS is offered at different levels and the course varies at each level.

Religious and moral education in non-denominational schools and religious education in Roman Catholic schools is a statutory core subject in all primary and secondary schools, including at S5 and S6. All pupils in Scotland must study RMPS for around one hour per week.

== Higher (school exams) ==
Pupils wishing to study this subject at Higher level should have successfully completed this subject at National 5.

Higher RMPS, like all Higher courses, has three units.

The first unit is World Religions where candidates have the choice of studying one of the six major world religions; (Buddhism, Christianity, Hinduism, Islam, Judaism and Sikhism). This is worth 60 marks.

The second unit is Morality and Belief where candidates will study one of the following options; Morality & Justice, Morality & Relationships, Morality & Medicine, Morality & Conflict or Morality, Environment and Global Issues.

The third unit is Religious and Philosophical Questions; where candidates have the choice of one of the following; Origins of Life, Existence of God, Suffering & Evil, and Miracles. This is worth 20 marks.

There is also an assignment that students must complete throughout the academic year. This is worth 30 marks.

In 2011 the results of a three-year study were released, in which it was reported that despite many shortcomings in the way RMPS had been taught in Scotland, the subject was seeing "unprecedented interest and optimism"; the number of students sitting for the Higher RMPS increased from 1,323 in 2006 to about 4,100 in 2011. In 2023, 3,889 pupils sat the Higher exam, with almost 3,300 gaining a pass grade.

== Higher education ==
This subject can also be studied at Bachelor Degree level, and the qualification can be used to become a teacher in RMPS.
