= Higher (Scottish) =

National exam in Scotland

- Year started: 1888
- Offered: S5 and S6
- Restrictions on attempts: Multiple attempts just taken over multiple years
- Regions: Scotland
- Fee: Free

In the Scottish secondary education system, the Higher (Scottish Gaelic: Àrd Ìre) is one of the national school-leaving certificate exams and university entrance qualifications of the Scottish Qualifications Certificate (SQC) offered by Qualifications Scotland. It superseded the old Higher Grade on the Scottish Certificate of Education (SCE). Both are normally referred to simply as "Highers".

The modern Higher is Level 6 on the Scottish Credit and Qualifications Framework.

== History ==
=== Origins ===
In 1888, the Scottish Leaving Certificate was established in response to the terms of the Education (Scotland) Act 1872. It was designed to have higher and lower levels assessed as individual subjects including Mathematics, Ancient or Modern Foreign Language, Science, etc. The higher level aimed at university entrance and the lower to suit the General Medical Council entrance requirements. This was later revised to higher level for entry to university and lower for banking insurance and business. Between 1963 and 1982 Higher Grades were awarded by the Scottish Certificate of Education Examination Board (SCEEB), which later became the Scottish Examination Board (SEB), and was the historical terminal exam for the majority of Scottish secondary school pupils, especially those seeking work in skilled industries or progress onto higher education. They were usually taken in the 5th Year of secondary school (often referred to as S5, and entered at age 15 or 16). The SCE Higher progressed on from the SCE Ordinary Grade.

Pupils studied for one academic year (in practice two terms – Winter and Spring), sitting exams in the May of S5. The majority of courses were examined by written papers with practical work present in subjects such as Art and Design.

There existed a further extension qualification, the Certificate of Sixth Year Studies, which was awarded on a separate certificate.

=== 1992 revision ===
As a result of the Further and Higher Education (Scotland) Act 1992 a series of Revised Higher Grade courses was put in place. When listed on the SCE the subject name would be followed by (Revised).

The revision process changed the curriculum content and the method of examination with the majority of Higher Grade courses changing to two terminal papers with a coursework element. Paper A was a short answer question paper and Paper B required longer, more in-depth answers. Coursework could account for anything from 0% (English) to 30% (Computing Studies) of the final mark.

The majority of Scottish Higher Education Institutions were generally only accepting Revised Higher Grade for entry, except where a pupil was classed as a mature student (aged over 25).

=== 1999 revision ===
In 1999, a reform of the examination system known as "Higher Still" took place. In the process, a new style of Higher examination system was introduced in Scotland. The new Higher was designed to operate within a framework of qualifications known as National Qualifications. This was designed to link the most basic examination offered by the SQA (Access 1) with the most difficult one (Advanced Higher) on a continuous "ladder of achievement".

Qualifications offered under the "Higher Still" framework have a common structure, typically consisting of a mixture of summative and formative assessment. Qualifications usually consist of units of work ending in a basic competency test that functions as an internal assessment (commonly known as a "NAB" as they are drawn from the National Assessment Bank), and a terminal examination which serves to determine the final grade. To obtain a qualification, all the internal units for that qualification must be passed, and a passing grade must be obtained on the terminal examination. It is possible to sit the examination only, in which case "Exam Only" will be recorded on the Certificate. In some schools, all units must be passed (with two or less attempts) or the student is not allowed to sit the final national exam.

==== Criticism of modularisation ====
The system was criticised at the time of introduction as objections were made to the modularisation of subjects such as English and Art which require an accumulation of critical and productive skills over a full year rather than the passing of discrete modules, which was seen as a system much better suited to scientific subjects. However, strictly speaking, English teaching is not modularised, given that the internal assessments do not assess fixed blocks of knowledge, as in the sciences, rather, they assess specific skills and can be delivered at different points in the year. The modularisation of the Higher examination and the other qualifications under the "Higher Still" umbrella is also not the same as that of the English A-level, in which terminal examinations are themselves arranged into modules. Under the Scottish system, the final examination is still essentially synoptic in nature and draw from all units. Additionally, the internal units do not contribute to the grade awarded.

Higher became Level 6 on the SCQF and is now a National Course.

==== 2000 marking controversy ====
The administrative structure accompanying the new system was not entirely successful, and 2000 saw a marking fiasco that cost the head of the authority his job and severely damaged the career of the Education Minister, Sam Galbraith. Thousands of pupils received incorrect or late results, leading to difficulties for the pupils, UCAS (the University and Colleges Admissions Service) and Higher Education Institutions, as many pupils did not receive accurate exam results until after the universities' academic year had started.

== Role in university admissions ==
The most able candidates in S5 typically take five Higher subjects, and matriculation requirements for courses are specified from a range from CC to AAAAAA depending on the course and university. UK universities outside of Scotland may require students to study to Advanced Higher level, given that the Higher is equivalent to AS-level on the UCAS tariff. As Scottish university courses traditionally have a duration of 4 years, the loss of one year's schooling is compensated by an additional university year. The flexibility of the [National Qualifications] framework means that candidates may take a mixture of Higher courses and National 5 courses in S5, with a view to studying the Higher equivalent in S6, thus gaining university qualifications across two years. This system maximises the opportunities available to candidates of differing abilities.

An advantage of the system is that candidates will apply to University in S6 on the basis of determined Higher results. This avoids the problem of having to apply on the basis of predicted grade results, and eliminates much uncertainty involved in the setting of conditional offers.

== Current courses ==
All National Qualification Higher subjects follow the same modular structure and grading system. It is a common mistake to confuse vocational Higher National Courses with NQ Higher courses.

=== Structure ===
As a result of the Higher reforms, every Higher course now consists of:

- A compulsory core which all candidates must complete
- Optional elements which a candidate and/or centre choose to study
- Three Unit Assessments, (commonly referred to as UASPs). These are assessed by a centre and moderated by the SQA
- A final exam and, where applicable, coursework which determine the grade and level of pass.

Formerly, a candidate must pass all Unit Assessments as well as the final Course Assessment to pass a course. A student who fails a Unit Assessment is allowed one re-sit opportunity on a fresh, unseen assessment but may only get a second re-sit opportunity in exceptional circumstances. In theory, therefore, a student who passed all but one Unit, and went on to pass the final exam, would not be awarded the overall pass for the course until they had completed the outstanding Unit in a subsequent year.

=== Grades ===
Higher examinations, in common with all National Qualification levels, have 5 grades: A, B, C, D and No Award. On standardised mark scales, a D-grade represents scores of 40-49%. Furthermore, each is given tariff points towards the UCAS system.

Grade	Percentage
A	70% and above
B	60% – 69%
C	50% – 59%
D	40% – 49%
No Award	39% and below

Band	Percentage
1: A	85% and above
2: A	70% – 84%
3: B	65% – 69%
4: B	60% – 64%
5: C	55% – 59%
6: C	50% – 54%
7: D	40% – 49%
8: No Award	30-39%
9: No Award	0-29%

These are general grade boundaries and will vary by a few percentage points depending on the difficulty of the exam. The ultimate determination of grade boundaries depends upon the quantity of raw marks that would demonstrate achievement of criteria laid out in course specifications.

=== Subjects ===
The following is a list of courses currently available at Higher level:

- Accounting
- Administration and IT
- Applications of Mathematics
- Art and Design
- Biology
- Business Management
- Cantonese
- Care
- Chemistry
- Childcare and Development
- Classical Studies
- Computing
- Dance
- Design and Manufacture
- Drama
- Economics
- Engineering Science
- English
- English for Speakers of Other Languages
- Environmental Science
- Fashion and Textile Technology
- French
- Gaelic (Learners)
- Gàidhlig
- Geography
- German
- Graphic Communication
- Health and Food Technology
- History
- Human Biology
- Italian
- Latin
- Mandarin Simplified
- Mandarin Traditional
- Mathematics
- Media
- Modern Studies
- Music
- Music Technology
- Philosophy
- Photography
- Physical Education
- Physics
- Politics
- Psychology
- Religious, Moral and Philosophical Studies
- Sociology
- Spanish
- Urdu

== See also ==
- 2000 SQA examinations controversy
- Advanced Higher (Scottish)
- GCE Advanced Level (United Kingdom)
- National Qualifications
- Scottish Leaving Certificate
- Scottish Qualifications Authority
- Standard Grade
