= Qualifications Scotland =

Public body responsible for accrediting educational awards in Scotland

Qualifications Scotland Teisteanasan Alba
- Qualifications Scotland Logo
- Abbreviation: QS
- Predecessor: Scottish Qualifications Authority (SQA)
- Established: 2 December 2025; 4 months ago
- Purpose: Educational
- Headquarters: Glasgow / Dalkeith
- Location: Scotland
- Services: Exams and Assignments for all Scottish schools
- Official language: English
- Chair: Shirley Rogers
- Chief Executive: Nick Page
- Website: www.qualifications.gov.scot

Qualifications Scotland (Scottish Gaelic: Teisteanasan Alba) is the public body responsible for accrediting educational awards in Scotland from 2 December 2025.

== History ==
The Scottish Qualifications Authority (SQA) was previously responsible for the functions. In June 2021, the Scottish Government announced that the SQA would be replaced. The legislation for the new body to be set up was passed by the Scottish Parliament in June 2025.

Staff employed by the Scottish Qualifications Authority were to be transferred into the employment of Qualifications Scotland. Recruitment for the board, to include five teachers and lecturers, began in July 2025. The SQA's chief executive Nick Page became the new chief executive. At the start of February 2026, Page described Qualifications Scotland as being fully operational.
