= Scottish Vocational Qualification =

Certificate of vocational education in Scotland

A Scottish Vocational Qualification, or SVQ, is a certificate of vocational education in Scotland. SVQs are available to people of all ages. SVQs are developed by Sector Skills Councils, in partnership with industry and awarding bodies. After the SSC has developed the SVQ structure, awarding bodies can develop the full SVQ and then seek to have the SVQ accredited by the Accreditation Unit of the Scottish Qualifications Authority (SQA). SVQs can be awarded by an awarding body, once the awarding body has been approved by SQA Accreditation.

Scottish Vocational Qualifications are based on standards of competence that describe a candidate's ability to work in real conditions - having an SVQ is a confirmation that they are competent to the standards on which the SVQ is based. The standards of competence are developed by Sector Skills Councils on behalf of industry.

There are five levels of SVQ, whose definitions are as follows:

Level 1	basic, routine and repetitive work skills
Level 2	broad range of skills including non-routine activities and individual responsibility
Level 3	supervisory skills
Level 4	management skills
Level 5	senior management skills

Work is now underway to ensure that all SVQs, as the structures are being developed by the Sector Skills Councils and awarding bodies, will be credit rated for the Scottish Credit and Qualifications Framework.

== See also ==
- Education in Scotland
- National Qualifications
