= Scottish Qualifications Authority =

Educational accreditation body in Scotland (1997–2026)

Scottish Qualifications Authority Ùghdarras Theisteanas na h-Alba
- Scottish Qualifications Authority Logo

- Scottish Qualifications Authority Coat of Arms
- Abbreviation: SQA
- Successor: Qualifications Scotland (QS)
- Established: 1 April 1997; 29 years ago
- Dissolved: 2 December 2025; 11 months ago
- Merger of: Scottish Examination Board and Scottish Vocational Education Council
- Purpose: Educational
- Headquarters: Glasgow / Dalkeith
- Location: Scotland
- Services: Exams and Assignments for all Scottish schools
- Official language: English
- Chair: Shirley Rogers
- Budget: £85 million
- Staff: 1125
- Website: www.sqa.org.uk

The Scottish Qualifications Authority (SQA. Gaelic: Ùghdarras Theisteanas na h-Alba) was an executive non-departmental public body of the Scottish Government responsible for awarding qualifications and accrediting other awarding bodies. The majority of the authority's funding came from the Scottish Government. This was supplemented by fees for delivering qualifications and for accreditation. In January 2026 (amidst its transition to Qualifications Scotland) the authority employed over 1,000 people across its Glasgow and Dalkeith offices.

The SQA was best known for its delivery of the annual diet of public examinations to school pupils within Scotland. SQA Higher qualifications were the generally accepted level for entry to University, with Scottish Universities typically requiring a minimum of four Highers, with the required grades being dependent on the institution. However, a greater number of candidates of all ages participated in SQA specialist, vocational and higher education qualifications. The SQA was also accredited by Ofqual to offer educational qualifications in England.

In June 2021, following a review of Curriculum for Excellence by the OECD, there was an agreement that the SQA placed too much importance on exams and the Scottish government announced that the SQA was to be replaced.

The Education (Scotland) Act 2025 established the SQA's replacement body, Qualifications Scotland (QS; Scottish Gaelic: Teisteanasan Alba), on 1 December 2025. The BBC reported that QS was "taking [the SQA's] place" from 2 December 2025. QS later stated that it "replaced" the SQA on 1 February 2026; it was on this date that staff and property were transferred to the new organisation. The SQA was formally dissolved on 26 February 2026.

== History ==
Scottish Qualifications Authority Act 2002
- Act of the Scottish Parliament
- Scottish Parliament
- Long title: An Act of the Scottish Parliament to make provision in relation to the members of the Scottish Qualifications Authority; to confer power on the Scottish Ministers to regulate the procedure of that Authority; to provide for the establishment of a committee to consider and advise on matters relating to qualifications awarded by, and the functions and procedures of, that Authority; and for connected purposes.
- Citation: 2002 asp 14

Dates
- Royal assent: 6 June 2002
- Repealed: 1 February 2026
Other legislation
Repealed by	Education (Scotland) Act 2025

Status: Repealed

Text of statute as originally enacted

The SQA's functions and responsibilities were laid out in the Education (Scotland) Act 1996 as amended by the Scottish Qualifications Authority Act 2002 (asp 14). Until their merger, the two major Scottish examination authorities were the Scottish Examination Board (SEB) and the Scottish Vocational Education Council (SCOTVEC). The former issued the school-level examinations, then called Standard Grade, Higher Grade and Certificate of Sixth Year Studies (CSYS). A legacy of its two precursor bodies, the Authority's offices remained split over two sites, one in Glasgow and one in Dalkeith.

Under a major reform of Scottish exams (the National Qualifications or "Higher Still" reforms), the CSYS was replaced with a broadly equivalent qualification called Advanced Higher. Some curriculum changes were also made to the Higher grade at this time. The introduction of the reformed examinations system was criticised in the press and by the government after a series of administrative and computer errors led to several thousand incorrect Higher and Intermediate certificates being sent out. The crisis took several months to resolve, and several management figures, including the Chief Executive Ron Tuck, resigned or were fired.

== Scottish Candidate Number ==
The Scottish Candidate Number (SCN) (formerly SCOTVEC number) was allocated to pupils at school and in further-education colleges who undertook SQA (formerly SCOTVEC or Scottish Examination Board) qualifications.

== Qualification types ==
The SQA had a statutory responsibility to provide public examinations for Scottish state schools, though these were also used widely. It had a statutory responsibility to accredit (formally, scrutinize them and confirm that they conform to agreed UK criteria) vocational qualifications. None of its qualifications, still less its vocational qualifications, were protected by statute, but the Authority had a largely dominant position within all sectors of qualifications within Scotland. Some SQA awards, such as the Advanced Diploma were also offered internationally in locations including China, African countries, the Middle East, and more.

=== National Qualifications ===
A National Qualification (NQ) took the form of National Courses.

Standard Grades were in existence before the Higher Still reforms. There were three Standard Grade Levels: Foundation, General and Credit. They were normally taken at the age 14–15, or sometimes at 16 if the student's birthday was before May, usually during High School.

National Courses were introduced with the "Higher Still" reforms. There were seven National Courses; National 1, National 2, National 3, National 4, National 5, Higher, and Advanced Higher. A wide range of National Courses could be taken, from academic subjects such as English and Mathematics, to vocational subjects such as Accounting and Mental Health Care. A Course Assessment was normally taken at the end of a one-year course in the early summer.

In addition to traditional National Qualification Courses, a new suite of "pre-vocational" courses entitled "Skills for Work" were rolled out. Primarily available at Intermediate 1 and Intermediate 2 levels, these pre-vocational courses aimed to give students an awareness of the workplace environment, the skills required for entry to an industry, and generic employment skills. Each of these Courses were awarded on the Scottish Qualifications Certificate.

==== Reorganization of National Qualifications ====
National Qualifications were redesigned as follows in 2013:

Previous qualification	New qualification
Access 1	National 1
Access 2	National 2
Standard Grade (Foundation level); Access 3	National 3
Standard Grade (General level); Intermediate 1	National 4
Standard Grade (Credit level); Intermediate 2	National 5
Higher	Higher
Advanced Higher	Advanced Higher

According to the SQA, the new qualifications had "more focus on skills development compared to the existing qualifications". Greater emphasis was placed on 'deeper learning' by helping students to think for themselves; to apply and interpret the knowledge and understanding they have developed and to demonstrate the skills they have learned."

National 1–4 were assessed internally by institutions, subject to regulation by the SQA. National 5 courses and above had internal assessments, followed by an externally marked exam.

==== National Assessment Bank ====
With the introduction of Highers, Intermediate 1 and Intermediate 2 courses, the SQA also introduced a National Assessment Bank of short examinations for each subject. These were more commonly known as NABs or unit assessments, and contained questions from specific academic units at a basic level. Each candidate had to pass a certain number of NABs (usually three) before they could be presented for the final examination.

==== Release of results ====
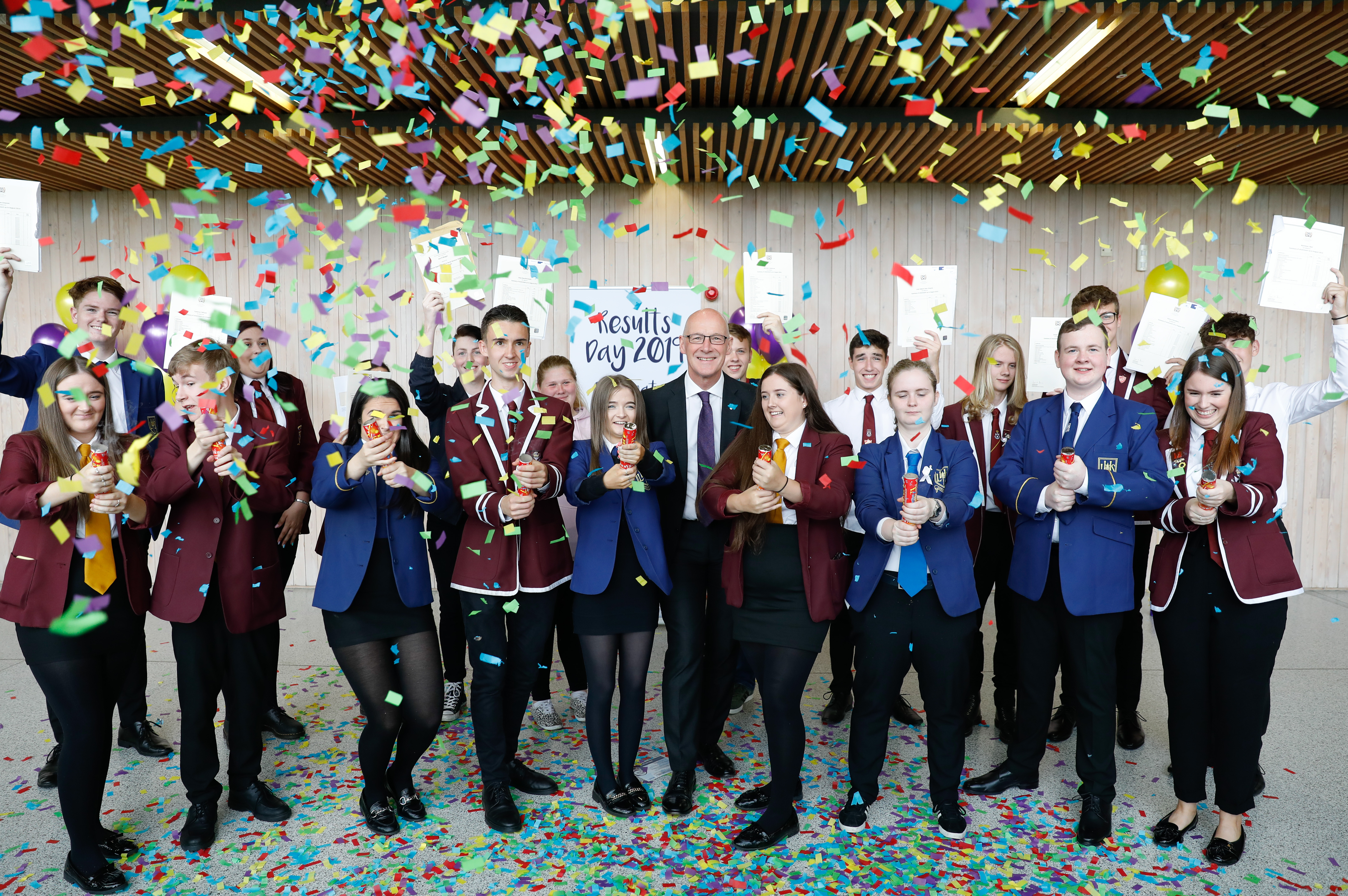
John Swinney with students on SQA results day, 2019

Students for National Qualifications received their results on, generally, the first Tuesday in August. Students signed up for the authority's MySQA system were able to check their record online throughout the year and got their exam results by text and/or email on the day that the results were issued. Those signed up to the service received their results one day earlier than the official postal results. This also occurred in subsequent years, however only due to a mistake by the company holding the results. In another incident, the SQA itself sent the results out on the right day, but Robert Gordon University's business school leaked whether students had been let in, and a technical error with St Andrew's University's website also leaked the results of applicants.

Due to concerns regarding incorrectly marked exams, institutions would at times submit appeal requests for an exam result to be re-reviewed. After the SQA introduced fees to institutions for unsuccessful appeals, the number of requests decreased by 55,000 students—a decline of 77%.

In order to fight the alleged grade inflation within the Scottish education sector, SQA introduced more academically and cognitively rigorous examination standards and stricter marking; this resulted in strong criticism towards the SQA exam board and a decrease of exam pass rates of up to 15%.

=== National units and programs ===
Many qualifications were titled vocational and were opportunistic stepping-stones for students at Scottish Colleges of Further Education to pursue one- or two- year programs tailored from a wide-ranging catalogue of National Units. The programs could be rigidly prescribed by employers or be freely chosen by students to meet any academic needs or career desires. The prescribed programs could be recognized by a National Certificate or a Scottish Progression Award.

=== SVQs and modern apprenticeships ===
Scottish Vocational Qualifications (SVQ) were an award for vocational education and training awarded by the SQA or other approved awarding bodies in conjunction with industry bodies. Scottish National Qualifications and Scottish Progression Awards were often important in a Modern Apprenticeship scheme along with SVQs. SVQs were developed by United Kingdom employers in tandem with National Vocational Qualifications (NVQ) for England, Wales and Northern Ireland.

SVQ were assessed in the workplace (or closely regulated training workshops) by employers, training providers or colleges approved and monitored by the SQA (or other awarding bodies) accredited by its independent Accreditation Unit.

=== Higher National Certificates and Diplomas ===
Qualifications aimed at students in their first two years of Higher Education included HNCs (Higher National Certificates)—taken as a one-year full-time course or as a two-year part-time course—and HNDs (Higher National Diplomas). These qualifications were extremely popular in colleges, workplaces and community education centers in Scotland, the UK and throughout the rest of world.

=== Students with disabilities ===
Specific qualifications were available for those with severe to moderate difficulties (Access), the right to aid in completing assessments (for example, a scribe) and the right to challenge any unfair or artificial barrier in the rules for any qualification.

=== English as a second language ===
There was a suite of National Units addressing the needs of economic migrants, asylum seekers and those seeking to master English before returning to their home countries. It had also developed qualifications for those seeking to teach English to refugees.

== Partnerships ==
SQA was one of the four partner national organizations involved in the Curriculum for Excellence. It worked with partners on all strands of the development. Its principal role was to contribute to work on qualifications and assessment. SQA's role in Curriculum for Excellence was to design and develop the new qualifications and assessment.

SQA joined with Universities Scotland, QAA Scotland and the Scottish Government to create the Scottish Credit and Qualifications Framework or SCQF. Every Scottish qualification—from the Access level for those with learning difficulties to a Doctorate and including vocational as well as ESOL and BSL qualifications—was allocated a level and credit value within this framework, which all partners agreed to recognize.

== Controversy ==
=== 2015 Higher Maths exam ===
The Higher Maths exam sat by students in May 2015 was said to be far too difficult. This evoked heated debates among students, teachers and educationalists; the corresponding grade boundaries for the respective exam were thus adjusted accordingly, with a pass mark as low as 34%. The SQA later admitted that one of their Higher Maths exam papers had been unusually hard and unfit for purpose.

=== 2016 exams ===
==== National 5 Maths exam ====
The National 5 Maths exam, sat on 12 May 2016, in particular Paper 1 (non-calculator), was also criticized by students after being considered much more difficult than previous years. A petition was created by students which was to be sent to the SQA demanding to know why the exam was exceedingly difficult, and it gained over 25,000 signatures.

==== National 5 Computing Science exam ====
Scottish Green MSP, Ross Greer criticized the SQA for mistakes in the National 5 Computing Science exam and called for an investigation into the exam, he defended teachers and students who thought that this was the worst exam ever set by the SQA. The SQA later admitted that the exam had mistakes.

=== 2018 exams ===
==== National 5 History exam ====
The SQA faced criticism for the 2018 National 5 History exam as the wrong date was given for the execution of Mary, Queen of Scots. While the SQA insisted their mistake did not disadvantage any pupil, teachers disagreed, saying that the mistake meant that pupils second guessed their knowledge. The mistake was criticized by many including historian Tom Devine, who called the error "unacceptable".

=== 2019 exams ===
==== National 5 and Higher Biology and Human Biology exams ====
The National 5 and Higher Biology and Human Biology exams, which took place on 30 April 2019, received criticism from candidates on social media, and featured on national news. They claimed they bore no resemblance to previous papers, and relied too heavily on problem solving and mathematics skills as opposed to biology content. A petition was created by pupils, demanding that the pass mark be lowered. SQA defended the examinations, claiming that they were fair tests of the subject.

=== 2020 exams ===
Due to the coronavirus pandemic, the SQA cancelled the 2020 exam diet. This was the first time in SQA's history that all exams were cancelled. Grades were given based on results in preliminary examinations and predicted grades from teachers.

After pupils received their results on 4 August, it emerged that the SQA had moderated downwards 124,000 grades from up to 75,000 pupils. This received criticism from candidates, teachers and politicians in all political parties in Scotland.

The subsequent criticism was heavily featured on social media and national news.

On 11 August, it was subsequently announced during an emergency statement by the Scottish education secretary that the SQA would reverse all downgraded results, while leaving upwards moderated results in situ. The change's resulting unprecedented increase in year-on-year performance was said to be 'outweighed' by the concerns of those affected and the loss of faith in the system.

=== 2021 exams ===
On 7 October 2020, due to the ongoing coronavirus pandemic, the SQA announced that the National 5 exams for 2021 were to be cancelled, but Highers and Advanced Highers would still go ahead. However, on 8 December 2020, then Scottish Education Secretary John Swinney announced that the Highers and Advanced Highers would also be cancelled, meaning all SQA exams in 2021 would not go ahead, with grades for all levels being decided instead by teacher judgement.

=== 2022 exams ===
After announcing in February 2022, that exams would be shifting to 'Scenario 2'. On 7 March 2022, the SQA's guidance on the 2022 exams were leaked via Twitter. The content of the guidance was described as "woefully inadequate" and in many cases provided no clarification for what to expect in an exam paper.

=== 2024 exams ===
==== National 5 and Higher Engineering Science exams ====
The Higher and National 5 Engineering Science exams in May 2024 were disrupted and faced criticism due to an error by the Scottish Qualifications Authority (SQA), which resulted in an incorrect edition of the data booklet being provided to candidates. Some examination centres were able to resolve this issue by distributing the correct data booklet.

==== Higher History exams ====
The higher history exam in May 2024 sparked an internal investigation after it was revealed "that teachers, including current exam marks, had accused the SQA of ‘moving the goalposts’ and subjecting students to an ‘unfair’ marking process for this year's Higher History exam." There was a 25% reduced pass rate in the Higher History exams compared to 2023, however the SQA maintained their stance that “the marking standard in 2024 did not change and that the marking and grading processes worked as intended.”

==== Blank emails on Results Day ====
On Results Day at 8am, candidates receiving their results by email got a blank email which didn't contain their grades. This reportedly affected over 7,000 students who signed up to receive their grades by email. The SQA's Chief Examiner Fiona Robertson apologized for the incident and it was remedied by 10am.

=== 2025 exams ===
==== Changes to the exam timetable ====
Before the exam schedule had even begun, concerns were raised about the 2025 exam timetable. Many key exams were scheduled on the same day or in very close succession, prompting the SQA to revise the timetable. On Monday, 3 February 2025, the SQA announced changes to the exam schedule for National 5, Higher, and Advanced Higher qualifications, stating the decision was made after listening to feedback from learners, schools, and parents/carers.

However, the revised timetable drew criticism, with some arguing that it was worse than the original. Despite this, the SQA confirmed that the updated version would stand as the final timetable for the 2024/25 exam diet.

=== 2025 data leak ===
On 8 March 2025, a post was made to a prominent hacking forum that claimed to have obtained all SQA coursework and assignments from 2004 to 2025. When asked to comment by the Daily Mail, the SQA confirmed that it was aware of credentials being misused to gain access to its website and was actively investigating.

== Abolition ==
In 2019, the Scottish Government commissioned the OECD to report on the state of Scotland's Curriculum for Excellence (CfE). The report found that the CfE focussed too much on examination in the senior phase. In June 2021, the Scottish Government announced it had "accepted in full" all 12 of the report's recommendations, and that the SQA would be replaced, with Education Scotland's school inspection duties being spun off.

On 4 June 2024, then-education secretary Jenny Gilruth introduced the Education (Scotland) Bill to the Scottish Parliament. If passed, the bill was to dissolve the SQA and establish in its place Qualifications Scotland (QS; Scottish Gaelic: Teisteanasan Alba). The bill was passed by MSPs on 25 June 2025; it received Royal Assent on 6 August. Not all of the act came into force with Royal Assent.

The sections of the act relevant to establishing QS came into force on 1 December 2025, and on the same day the BBC reported that Qualifications Scotland was "taking [the SQA's] place" from 2 December. The new organisation later announced it had "replaced" the SQA on 1 February 2026, the same day remaining SQA staff and property were transferred to QS. On 26 February 2026, the SQA was formally dissolved.

With the SQA now dissolved, Qualifications Scotland has become the sole national body for the design and award of secondary-level qualifications in Scotland. The QS are set to reform National 4 and 5-level qualifications by 2031, and Higher and Advanced Higher-level qualifications by 2032.
