= Curriculum for Excellence =

School curriculum used in Scotland

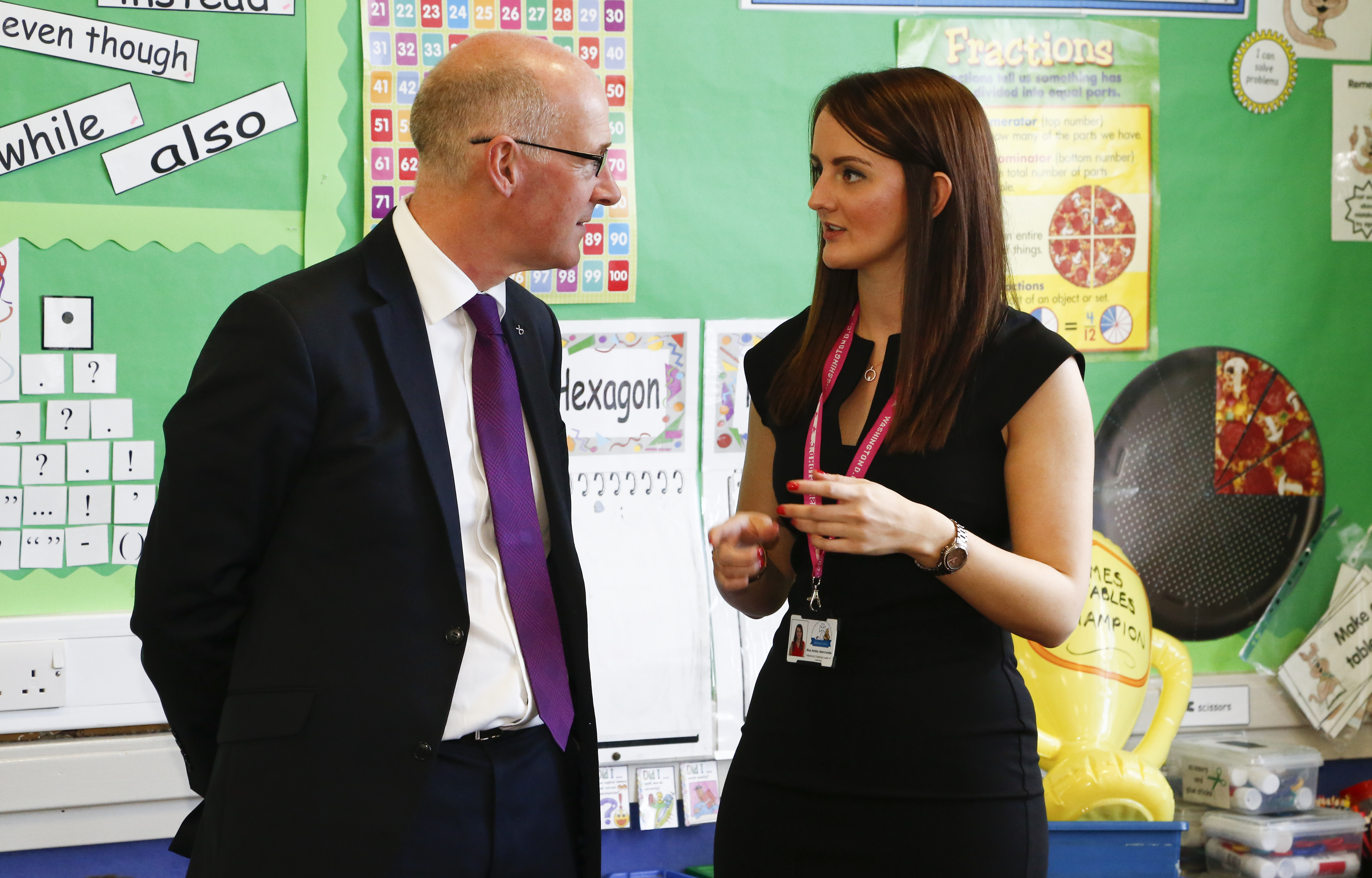
Education secretary John Swinney meets with teachers to discuss Curriculum for Excellence, 2016

Curriculum for Excellence (Scottish Gaelic: Curraicealam airson Sàr-mhathais) is the national curriculum in Scotland, used by Scottish schools for learners ages 3–18. The implementation of Curriculum for Excellence is overseen by Education Scotland, the executive agency of the Scottish Government responsible for the education system in Scotland.

== History ==
=== Development ===
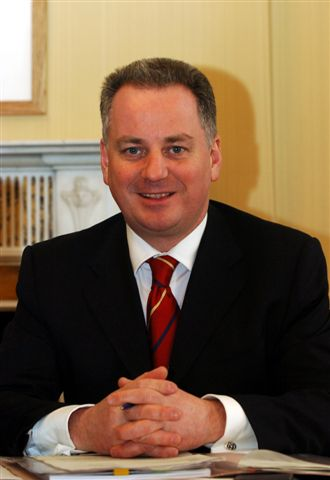
Jack McConnell, First Minister

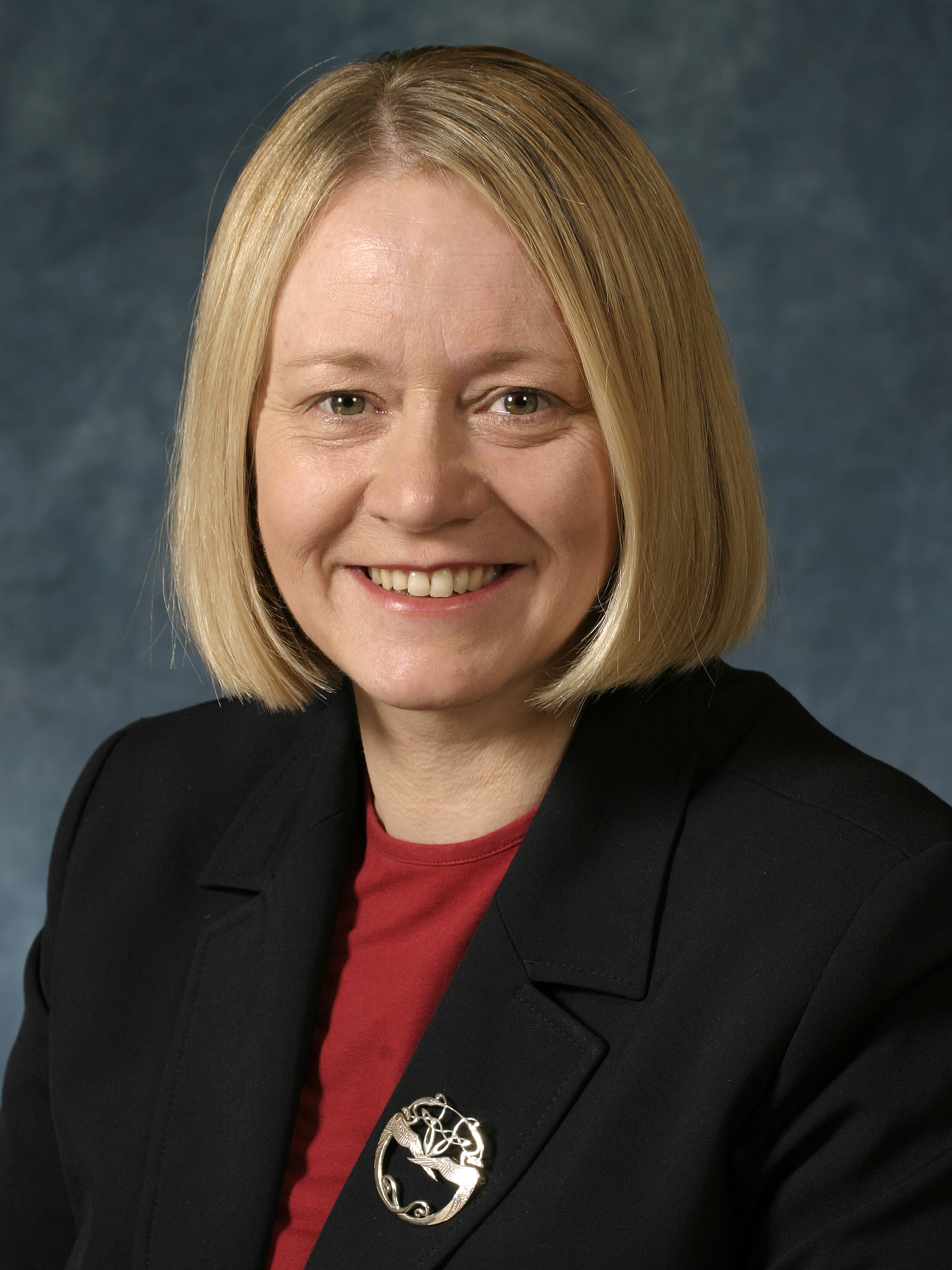
Cathy Jamieson, Minister for Education and Young People

Key government ministers during the National Debate on Education (2002)

The Curriculum for Excellence was developed out of the National Debate on Education, a 2002 consultation exercise on the state of school education undertaken by the First McConnell government of the Scottish Executive. In response to the National Debate, Ministers established a Curriculum Review Group in November 2003 to identify the purposes of education for the 3–18 age range and to determine key principles to be applied in a redesign of the curriculum. Its work resulted in the publication in November 2004 of the document A Curriculum for Excellence. This document identified four key purposes of education; those that enable young people to become, "successful learners, confident individuals, responsible citizens and effective contributors."

The Curriculum for Excellence is described by Education Scotland as "placing learners at the heart of education".

Education Scotland claims that as part of their learner journey, all "children and young people in Scotland are entitled to experience a coherent curriculum from 3 to 18, in order that they have opportunities to develop the knowledge, skills and attributes they need to adapt, think critically and flourish in today's world". The totality of the Curriculum for Excellence can be experienced through Curriculum areas and associated subjects, Interdisciplinary learning, Ethos and life of the school as well as wider Opportunities for personal achievement.

=== Implementation ===
The Curriculum for Excellence was implemented in schools in 2010−11. Its implementation is overseen by Education Scotland. In Scotland, councils and schools both have some responsibility for what is taught in schools and they must also take national guidelines and advice into account.

A review was undertaken by the OECD, having been commissioned by the Scottish Government to look at the broad general education. A refreshed narrative on the curriculum which establishes Curriculum for Excellence "within the current context" was published by Education Scotland in September 2019.

== Overview ==
=== Curriculum areas ===
The areas of Curriculum for Excellence are:

- Expressive arts
- Health and wellbeing
- Languages (including English, Gàidhlig, Gaelic (Learners), modern languages and classical languages)
- Mathematics
- Religious and moral education (including Religious and moral education and Religious education in Roman Catholic schools)
- Sciences
- Social studies
- Technologies

The curriculum areas of literacy, numeracy and health and wellbeing are recognised by Education Scotland and the Scottish Government as being particularly important curricular areas, and as such, they are seen as "being the responsibility of all staff" in Scottish schools.

=== Benchmarks ===
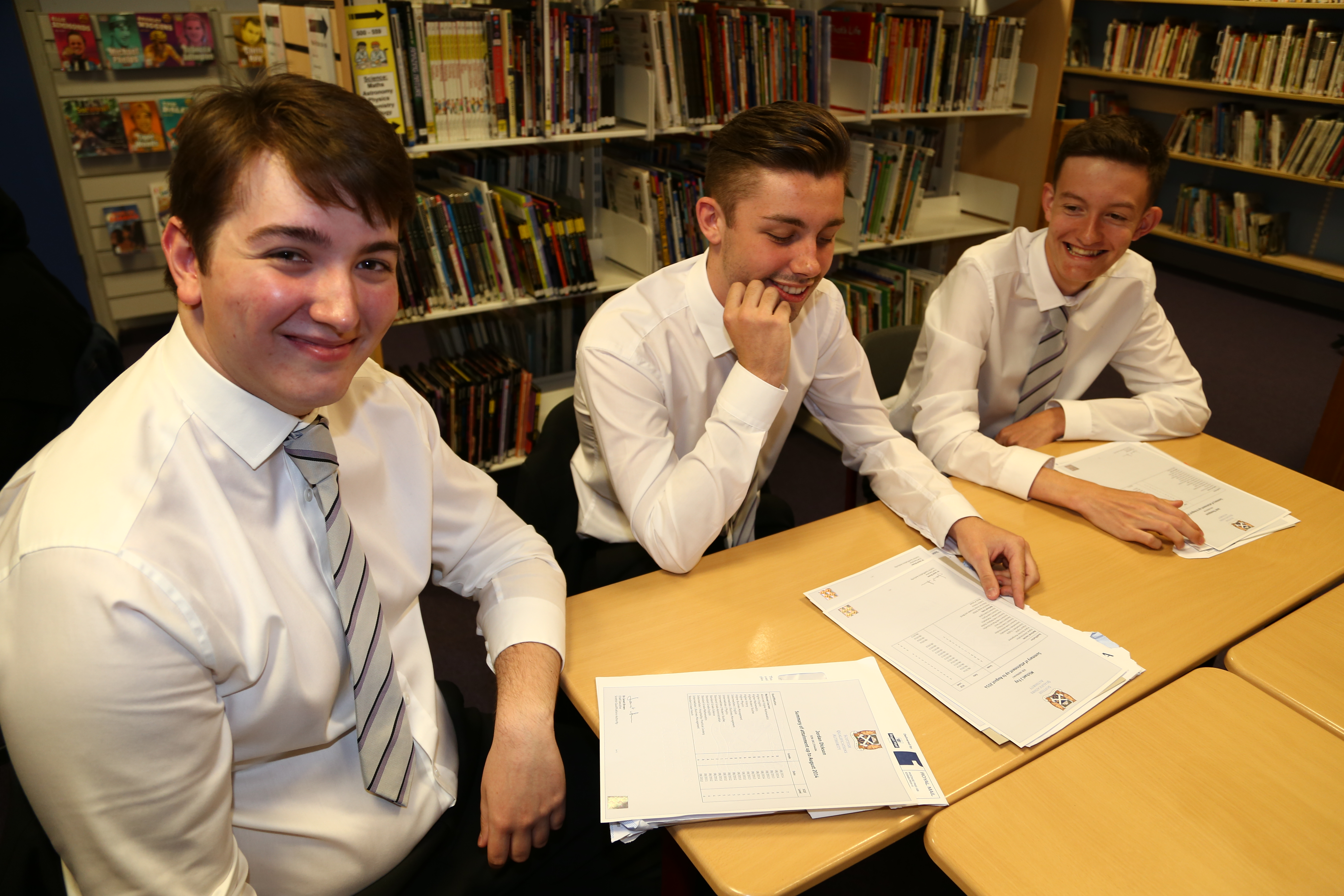
Scottish school pupils on "Exam Day", 2014

In August 2016, Education Scotland produced what is known as "benchmarks" in order to "provide clarity on the national standards expected within each curriculum area at each level". Education Scotland's Curriculum for Excellence (CfE) Statement for Practitioners document which was published in August 2016 stated that there was to be two new key resources which support practitioners to plan learning, teaching and assessment, one of which was Benchmarks, and the other focused on Experiences and Outcomes. The established Benchmarks explain the lines of progression within learning in the curricular areas of literacy and English and numeracy and mathematics, as well as across all other curriculum areas from Early Level to Fourth Level (First to Fourth Levels in Modern Languages, as Early Level is not included). The purpose statement issued by Education Scotland claimed that the introduction of Benchmarks was required "to make clear what learners need to know and be able to do to progress through the levels, and to support consistency in teachers’ and other practitioners’ professional judgements".

The Benchmarks issued for literacy and numeracy should "be used to support teachers’ professional judgement of achievement of a level". Education Scotland expects that within all other curriculum areas in Curriculum for Excellence, that Benchmarks will be used in order to support teachers and practitioners to "understand standards and identify children's and young people's next steps in learning". Education Scotland claim that teachers and practitioners much gather a range of information of children's progress in learning which they expect will come from a variety of sources including:

- observing day-to-day learning within the classroom, playroom or working area; • observation and feedback from learning activities that takes place in other environments, for example, outdoors, on work placements; • coursework, including tests;
- learning conversations; and
- planned periodic holistic assessment

Achievement of a level within Curriculum for Excellence is expected to be based on teacher professional judgement which is well informed by a wide range of evidence. Benchmarks can be used by teachers and practitioners in order to "review the range of evidence gathered to determine if the expected standard has been achieved and the learner has":

- achieved a breadth of learning across the knowledge, understanding and skills as set out in the experiences and outcomes for the level;
- responded consistently well to the level of challenge set out in the Experiences and Outcomes for the level and has moved forward to learning at the next level in some aspects; and
- demonstrated application of what they have learned in new and unfamiliar situations.

=== Qualifications ===
New qualifications were set out in 2014 by the Scottish Qualifications Authority to meet with the Curriculum for Excellence. The new qualifications were:

- National 1
- National 2
- National 3 – Replaced the "Foundation"-level Standard Grade
- National 4 – Replaced the "General"-level Standard Grade
- National 5 – Replaced the "Credit"-level Standard Grade
- Higher – Replaced older versions of the Higher Grade course
- Advanced Higher – Replaced the Certificate of Sixth Year Studies

National 1–4 qualifications are internally assessed by teachers, whereas National 5, Higher and Advanced Higher qualifications are externally assessed by the Scottish Qualifications Authority.

== Criticism ==
Before its introduction, many within the Scottish teaching profession, including the teachers' trade union The Educational Institute of Scotland (EIS) and its members, believed that the Curriculum for Excellence was too vague, in particular regarding its supposed 'outcomes and experiences'. There existed a fear that this imprecision would result in a lack of clarity in what was expected of teachers in the classroom and in the assessment of pupils' progress and attainment.

The original concerns led East Renfrewshire, one of the most educationally successful local authorities, to delay implementation of the secondary school phase of the new curriculum by one year. Some Scottish independent schools, including St Aloysius' College, in Glasgow, chose to do the same.

== See also ==
- Education in Scotland
- Education in the United Kingdom
- National Curriculum for England – England
- Northern Ireland Curriculum – Northern Ireland
- Curriculum for Wales (2022 to present) – Wales (current)
