= Holyrood Secondary School =

- Picture of Badge

Location
- 100 Dixon Road; Glasgow, Greater Glasgow, G42 8AU; Scotland; 55.8325°N 4.25194°W

Information
- Type: Comprehensive
- Motto: Latin: Hoc vince ("By this conquer!")
- Religious affiliation: Roman Catholic
- Established: 1936
- Head teacher: Sharon Watson
- Staff: 200
- Gender: Co-educational
- Age: 11 to 18
- Enrolment: 2,170
- Language: English
- Hours in school day: 6 h 5 min / 6 h 55 min
- Colours: Blue, grey and white
- Website: http://www.holyrood-sec.glasgow.sch.uk

Holyrood Secondary School is a Roman Catholic secondary school in the south-side of Glasgow, Scotland. It is notable for its comparatively large secondary school enrollment, having had over 2,000 pupils and 150 teaching staff. Holyrood is located near Crosshill railway station, Hampden Park, A728 and the new M74 motorway.

Officially opened in 1936, the school's enrolment rapidly expanded amid the closure of several surrounding secondary schools in the city's south-side. To accommodate the surge in pupils attending Holyrood, the school underwent several refurbishments, most recently in the early 2000s which included the Holyrood Sports Centre. The school can accommodate more than 420 new 1st Year starts, the biggest intake of any secondary school in Scotland.

In 2019, Holyrood RC Secondary School was ranked the 82nd best performing school in Scotland by the Scottish Government: 43 per cent of pupils attained five or more awards at SCQF Level 6, the equivalent of Highers.

== History ==
The school was founded in 1936 and originally functioned as a senior secondary with entry dependent on a high mark in the "qualifying examination". In 1971 the exam was abolished and all Scottish state schools became equal in terms of status, curriculum offered and examinations taken.

In 2012, the school was the subject of a BBC television documentary series titled High School.

In 2017, former pupil Joe McFadden visited Holyrood during his appearance on the BBC's Strictly Come Dancing. The school was featured in an episode, as McFadden and his dance partner Katya Jones showcased a dance in front of the pupils.

In 2020 Holyrood, along with all other Scottish schools, closed due to the COVID-19 pandemic. The SQA for the first time in 130 years cancelled all exams.

== Facilities ==
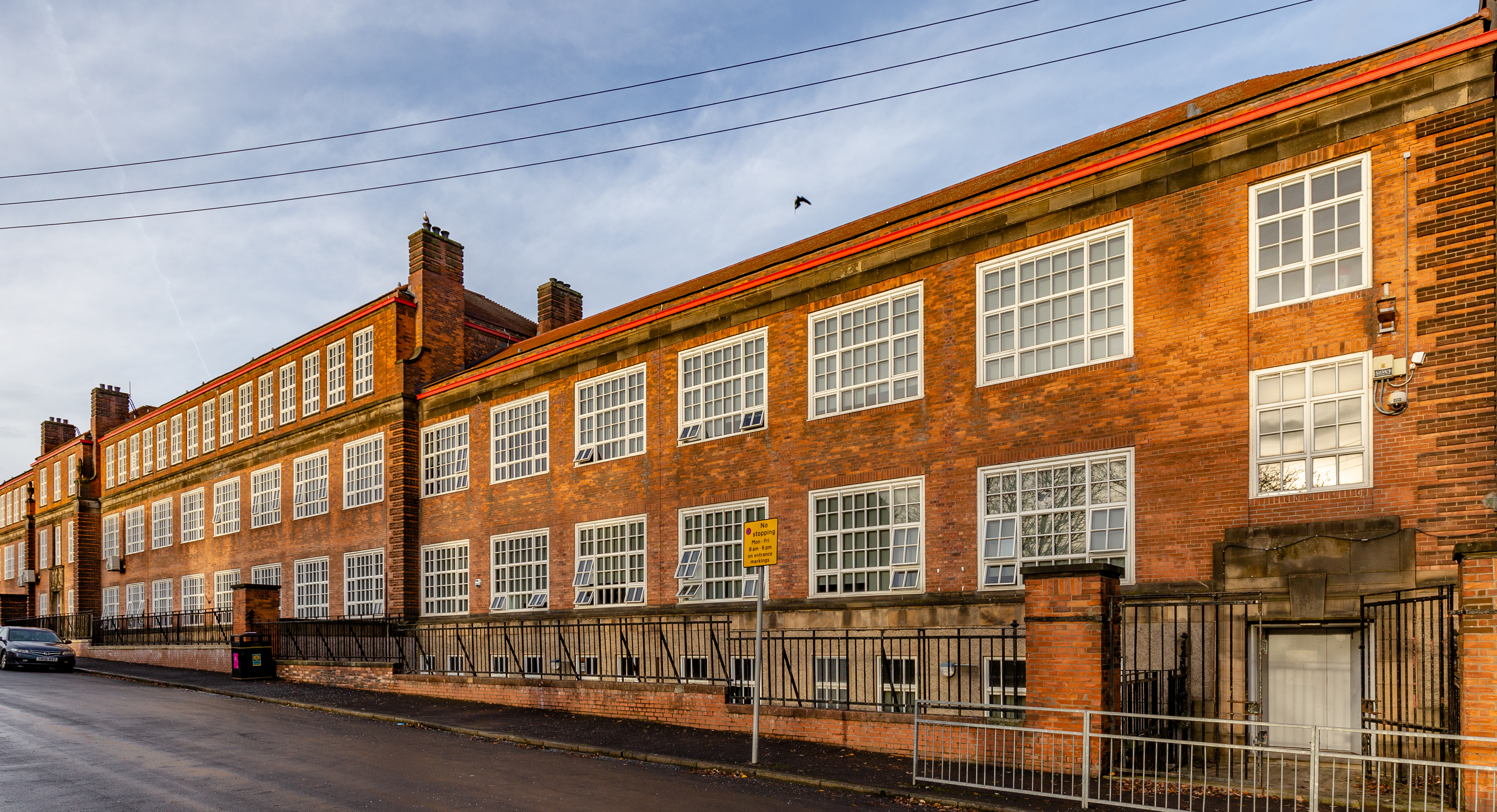
Rear entrance of the school, on Albert Road

The original school building, designed by the firm of John Burnet, Son & Dick, was built in 1936, and is now protected as a category B listed building.

Over the years, the school has had renovation and additional blocks purposely built, known as the "new block" and "I.T. Wing". The new block also features new classrooms for English, religious education and modern languages. The school features over 20 purpose built I.T. rooms and also hosts three drama studios, complete with sound and lighting effects. It has several wood work and metal workshops as well as modern laboratories for physics, chemistry and biology. Nearly all classrooms within the school are fully equipped with smart boards and projectors.

In 2001, Glasgow city council commissioned a modern sports centre to be built directly next to Holyrood, known as Holyrood Sports Centre. The school has exclusive access during the day to all the facilities, with the centre being open at night to the public. The sports centre features a full size synthetic floodlit pitch, three seven-a-side pitches, changing rooms, inside gym hall and shower accommodation. In addition, an open plan gym which can be split into two separate halls, a dance studio and a modern extensive fitness suite. These facilities are used by all pupils for physical education and are an addition to the swimming pool and gymnastics hall.

In 2012, the school was selected as the Glasgow base for the Scottish Football Association's Performance Schools, a system devised to support the development of the best young talented footballers across the country (there are seven such schools across Scotland). As of 2018, the dedicated coach for the young players at Holyrood is Joe McBride.

== Year groups ==
=== Year groups ===
Year	Deputy Head	Pastoral care team	Capacity (estimated)
First Year (S1)	Mr Quinn	Ms Mackenzie	381
First Year (S1)	Mr Quinn	Miss Rocchicholi	381
Second Year (S2)	Mr Roy	Mr Malone	377
Second Year (S2)	Mr Roy	Miss Madden	377
Third Year (S3)	Mr Docherty	Miss Boyle	357
Third Year (S3)	Mr Docherty	Miss Reece	357
Third Year (S3)	Mr Docherty	Mr McAvoy	357
Fourth Year (S4)	Ms McMahon	Miss Campbell	379
Fourth Year (S4)	Ms McMahon	Mrs Darroch	379
Fifth Year (S5)			290
Sixth Year (S6)			241

== Malawi partnership ==
The school has established a close partnership with Mary's Meals, which saw former deputy head, Tony Begley, resign from his position to take up a new role as the education co-ordinator of this non-profitable charity. The school has also been at the forefront of fundraising for Malawi as well as Mary's Meals which involves under 30 pupils travelling to areas close to Blantyre, Malawi to reconstruct, renovate and build schools.

A team of 36 young people was chosen for 2013 after a successful five years of the project and planned to continue the work in Malawi, led by previous head teacher, Thomas McDonald. The school has so far raised in excess of £200,000 for Malawi.

Due to the coronavirus pandemic, the 2020 Malawi, and subsequently 2021 Malawi projects had to be cancelled.

== Admissions ==
The school has a roll of approximately 2,000 pupils and 150 teachers, making it one of the largest state comprehensive schools in Europe.

== Notable former pupils ==
Arts & media

- Frankie Boyle, comedian
- James Boyle, broadcaster: head of BBC Radio Scotland and controller of BBC Radio 4, chairman of the Scottish Arts Council
- Charlie Burchill, Scottish musician and composer, best known as the guitarist of Simple Minds
- Des Clarke (b. 1981), comedian
- Bob Crampsey, Scottish association football historian, author, broadcaster and teacher (including history teacher at Holyrood in the 1970s)
- Tony Curran, actor
- Fran Healy, Scottish singer, songwriter and musician, lead singer and lyricist of the band Travis
- Jim Kerr, Scottish singer-songwriter and the lead singer of the rock band Simple Minds
- Johnny McElhone, musician and songwriter of Altered Images, Hipsway and Texas
- Joseph McFadden, actor
- Brian McGee (b. 1959), musician
- James Meechan (b. 1930), artist

Business & finance

- Willie Haughey, businessman and philanthropist
- Benny Higgins, banker

Politics

- Margaret Ferrier, MP (2015–2017 and 2019–2023 for Rutherglen and Hamilton West)
- Jim Fitzpatrick, Labour MP for Poplar and Canning Town since 1997, and former London Fire Brigade firefighter
- Baroness Kennedy of The Shaws, lawyer, human rights activist and chair of the British Council
- Pat McFadden, Labour MP for Wolverhampton South East since 2005
- Bob McTaggart (1945–1989), Labour Party politician; Member of Parliament (MP) for Glasgow Central

Sports

- Alan Brazil, former professional footballer with Ipswich Town, Detroit Express, Tottenham Hotspur, Manchester United, Coventry City, Queens Park Rangers; presents Talksport radio breakfast show
- Paddy Crerand, former Scotland International footballer, clubs included Celtic and Manchester United
- Ethan Erhahon, St Mirren and Scotland U21 International footballer
- Charlie Gallagher, footballer
- Jim McCalliog, former Scotland international footballer
- Lee McConnell (b. 1978), athlete
- John McGeady (b. 1958), footballer
- Nathan Patterson (b. 2001), footballer
- Abi Harrison, women footballer

== Chaplaincy ==
The school chaplain is John Carroll.
