= Coláiste Lurgan =

Irish-language summer school in County Galway, Ireland

Location
- Coill Rua Thoir, Knock South; Indreabhán, County Galway, H91 E938; Ireland; 53.2465°N 9.3648°W

Information
- School type: Independent summer school
- Motto: Gaeilge gan Eagla (Irish without Fear)
- Years offered: 1st, 2nd, 3rd, 4th, 5th, Transition Year
- Student to teacher ratio: 1:20
- Language: Gaeilge
- School fees: €985-1,290 per course
- Website: lurgan.biz

Coláiste Lurgan is an independent summer school that runs three-week Irish-language immersion courses in the Connemara Gaeltacht village of Indreabhán in County Galway.

As part of their student-directed focus in language teaching, the school runs TG Lurgan, an initiative for helping students to acquire vocabulary by producing covers of popular music. The pop group, Seo Linn, was formed following the success of some of these covers.
