= Secondary education in Scotland =

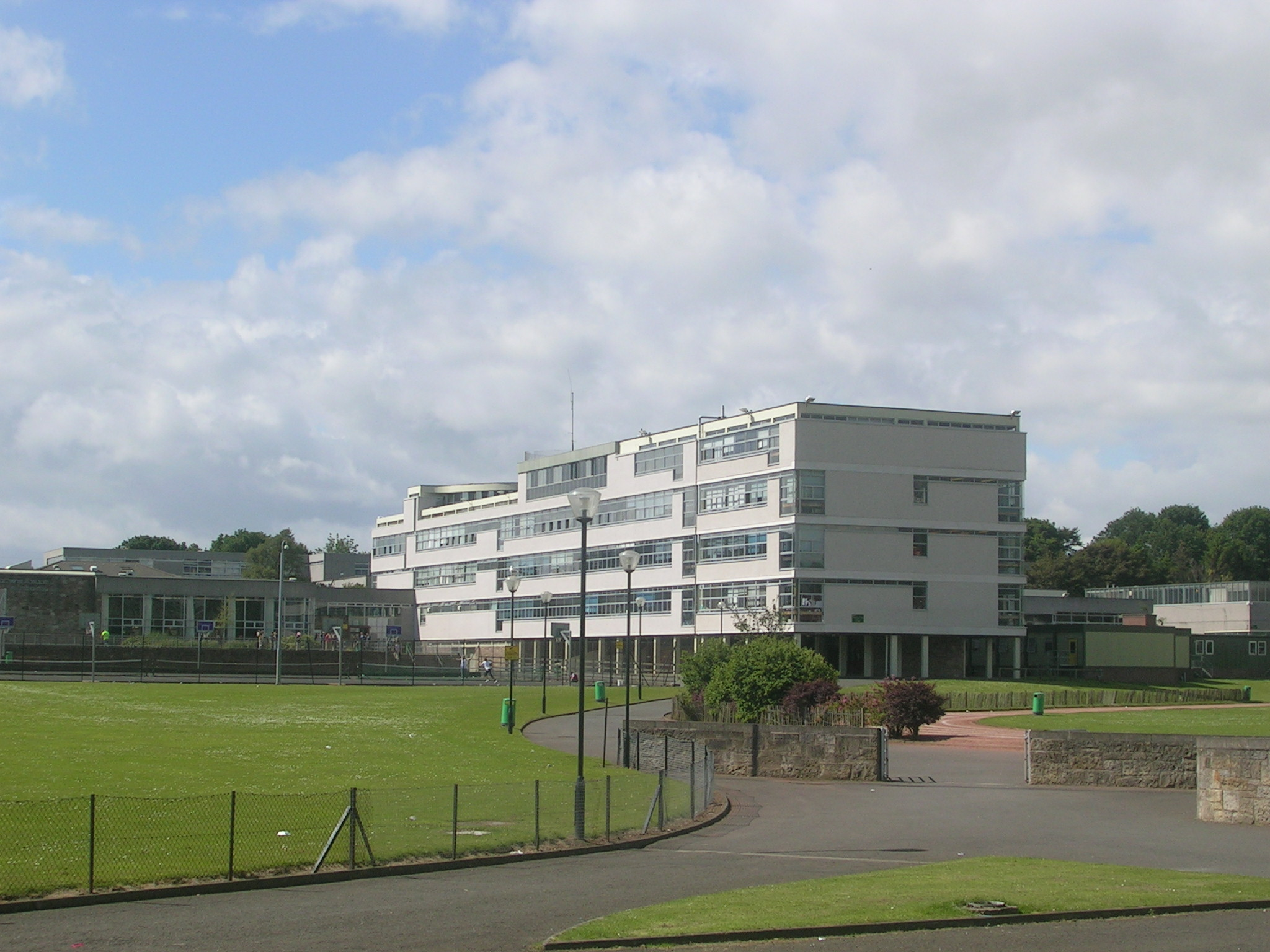
Balwearie High School

Secondary education in Scotland can take up to 6 years, covering ages 11 to 16, from S1 to S6. Education is not compulsory after the age of 16, the age of majority in Scots law.

State School	Year	Ages	Curriculum	Final exam
Pre-school	Nursery	Ages 3 to 4	Early learning	None, schools may set end of year tests.
Primary School	Primary 1	Ages 4–5 or 5–6	Broad general education	SNSAs (P1)
Primary School	Primary 2	Ages 5–6 or 6–7	Broad general education	None, schools may set end of year tests.
Primary School	Primary 3	Ages 6–7 or 7-8	Broad general education	None, schools may set end of year tests.
Primary School	Primary 4	Ages 7–8 or 8–9	Broad general education	SNSAs (P4)
Primary School	Primary 5	Ages 8–9 or 9–10	Broad general education	None, schools may set end of year tests.
Primary School	Primary 6	Ages 9–10 or 10–11	Broad general education	None, schools may set end of year tests.
Primary School	Primary 7	Ages 10–11 or 11–12	Broad general education	SNSAs (P7)
Secondary School	First Year (S1)	Ages 11–12 or 12–13	Broad general education	None, schools may set end of year tests.
Secondary School	Second Year (S2)	Ages 12–13 or 13–14	Broad general education	None, schools may set end of year tests.
Secondary School	Third Year (S3)	Ages 13–14 or 14–15	Broad general education	SNSAs (S3)
Secondary School	Fourth Year (S4)	Ages 14–15 or 15–16	Senior phase	National 3, 4 & 5
Secondary School	Fifth Year (S5)	Ages 15–16 or 16–17	Senior phase	Highers
Secondary School	Sixth Year (S6)	Ages 16–17 or 17–18	Senior phase	Advanced Highers

Note: Some ages vary because of the child's birth year.

In Scotland, students transfer from primary to secondary education at 11 or 12 years old. Pupils usually attend the same secondary school as their peers, as all secondaries have 'intake primaries'. Pupils attend either a non-denominational school or a Roman Catholic school, according to their family's beliefs. Pupils in Scotland attend the same secondary school throughout their education; no sixth form colleges operate in Scotland, as in other countries in the United Kingdom.

== Senior 1 to Senior 6 ==
The first and second years of secondary school (abbreviated to S1 and S2) are a continuation of the Curriculum for Excellence started in primary school, after which no set national approach is established. S3 is still considered to be with the Broad General Education (or BGE) phase. Some schools allow students to start to narrow their field of study, with exceptions for compulsory subjects such as English and Mathematics. In S4, students undertake 6–9 subjects called Nationals, and at this stage, students tend to be presented at levels 3–5. Nationals should take one year to complete. National 3 has no external exam. National 4 and National 5 however are levels that start external exams. Some National 5 & 4 qualifications, such as Physical Education, also have no external exam. Rarely, S4 pupils take a class that could be a higher class.

After these qualifications, some students leave to gain employment or attend further education colleges; however these days most students study for Highers, of which five are usually studied. These take a year to complete, after which some students apply to university or stay on for S6, where other Highers are gained, or Advanced Highers are studied. Due to the nature of schooling in Scotland, undergraduate honours degree programmes are four years long as matriculation had historically been done at the completion of Highers in S5 (age 16–17), which compares with three years for the rest of the UK. As well as instruction through the English language, there's also Gaelic medium education at some schools.

== School qualifications ==
=== History ===
The vast majority of Scottish pupils take Scottish Qualifications Certificate qualifications provided by the Scottish Qualifications Authority (SQA). Historically, pupils sat O-grades in S3-S4 followed by Higher Grades in S5 and CSYS in S6.

From 1986-2013, most pupils took Standard Grades (but some schools offered Intermediates instead) in S3-S4, and Highers in S5. For those who wish to remain at school for the final year (S6), more Highers and Advanced Highers (formerly CSYS) in S6 could be taken. Intermediate 1 and Intermediate 2 qualifications – which were intended to be roughly equivalent to General and Credit Level Standard Grades respectively, but in practice (although they may vary from subject to subject), Intermediate 1 was easier than General, and Intermediate 2 harder than Credit – could also be taken in lieu of any of the aforementioned qualifications.

=== National qualifications ===
From 2013 to 2014, Intermediates 1, 2 and Access 1–3 ceased to be in use. These qualifications were replaced by National qualifications that are designed to fit in with the Scottish Government's "Curriculum for Excellence" system.

Pupils can go to university at the end of S5, as Highers provide the entry requirements for Scottish universities, which have 4 year university terms, compared to 3 years for English universities. In recent times, it is more common for students to remain until S6, taking further Highers and/or taking Advanced Highers or those going to universities outside of Scotland.

All educational qualifications in Scotland are not part of the Scottish Credit and Qualifications Framework.

S3 and S4	S5	S6
National 3, 4 or 5	Higher	Advanced Higher

== Trades unions ==
- Association of Headteachers and Deputes in Scotland
- Educational Institute of Scotland
- School Leaders Scotland
- Scottish Secondary Teachers' Association

== See also ==
- Education in Scotland
