= Arran High School =

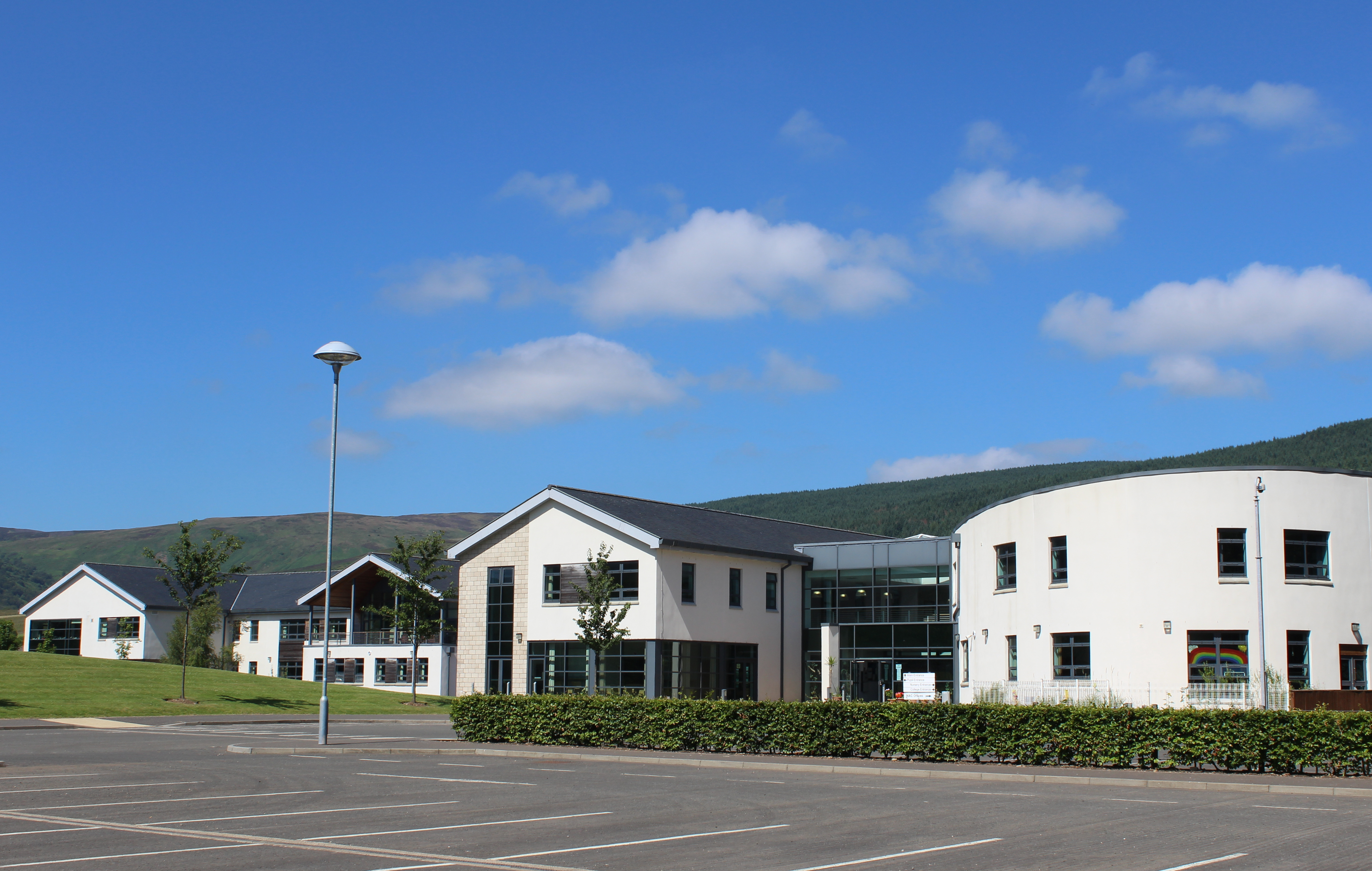

Location
- Lamlash, Isle of Arran, North Ayrshire, Scotland, KA27 8NG

Information
- Type: 11–18 non-denominational state–funded secondary school
- Established: 1946
- Headteacher: Vicki Lockhart
- Gender: Boys and girls
- Age: 11 to 18
- Enrolment: 250 (2023–2024)
- Website: arranhigh.co.uk

Arran High School is a state-funded secondary school in Lamlash, on the Isle of Arran, Scotland. It is the only secondary school on the island, and is located beside Lamlash Primary School. In 2024, Arran High School had a pupil roll of 250 boys and girls attending the school. Children attending each of the seven primary schools on the Isle of Arran transfer to Arran High School in S1 for their secondary education.

At the beginning of 2008, a new school building was opened, replacing an older building which dated from the late 1930s. The current head teacher is Ms Vicki Lockhart.

== History ==
Before the school, pupils from the island would need to travel to and board at a school on the Isle of Bute. The original Arran High School building was completed in 1939 but the building was taken over for use as a hospital in World War II. It only became a school in 1946 and was used as both a primary and secondary school. At this time, the school was known as Lamlash Junior Secondary.

Former First Minister of Scotland Jack McConnell officially opened the new school building on 9 June 2008, although pupils were being educated in the new building since January 2008.

The school has 25 classrooms as well as a workshop, a theatre, a gym hall and dance studio, a fitness suite, a library, three support rooms and a cafeteria. The school also has a nursery for children aged 5 and younger, as well as three college rooms which Argyll College use. Within the school grounds there is a youth centre which was due to be demolished, but was resited to a new location within the school grounds instead.

== Attainment and achievement ==
In 2024, 94% of pupils in Third year (S3) attained third or fourth Level of Curriculum for Excellence in reading and writing, 92% achieving third or fourth Level in listening and talking and 92% attaining third or fourth level in literacy. 50% of pupils in S3 achieved fourth level of Curriculum for Excellence in reading skills, with 33% achieving fourth level in literacy. 78% of pupils achieved third or fourth level in numeracy, whilst 33% achieved fourth level in numeracy.

In Scottish Qualification Authority examinations undertaken by pupils in Fourth year (S4), Fifth year (S5) and Sixth year (S6), Arran High School performs consistently above the North Ayrshire Council average. 80% of pupils attending Arran High School left the school with qualifications in Literacy and Numeracy at SCQF 5 or above. This figure is higher than both the Virtual Comparator used by the Scottish Government to measure performance of other similar schools, as well as the North Ayrshire Council local authority average.

== House system ==
- – Iorsa
- – Rosa
- – Sannox
- – Shuraig

== Head teachers ==
Mr Petrie – 1947–1972 – Retired
Mr D Oakes – 1972–1994 – Retired
Mr I Murray – 1994–1998 – Left
Miss S Smith – 1998–2003 – Retired
Mr D Auld – 2003–2014 – Retired
Mr B Smith – 2014–2020 – Left
Mrs S Foster – 2021–2025 - Retired
Ms V Lockhart - 2025 - Current

== Notable pupils ==
- Jack McConnell (born 1960), First Minister of Scotland (2001–2007)
- Katharine O'Donnelly, actress
