= High School (disambiguation) =

A high school or secondary school is a formal learning institution.

High School may also refer to:

- High school (North America), covering ages 14–18 (level 3 of the ISCED scale) in the K-12 system

== Film and television ==
- High School (1940 film), an American film
- High School (1954 film), an Italian film
- High School (1968 film), a documentary
- High Schools (film), a 1984 documentary
- High School High (1996), a comedy starring Jon Lovitz and Mehki Phifer
- High School Musical, a 2006 made-for-TV film
  - High School Musical (franchise), a media franchise
    - High School Musical 2, 2007 sequel to High School Musical
    - High School Musical 3: Senior Year, 2008 theatrical sequel to High School Musical
    - High School Musical: The Musical: The Series, a 2019-present Disney+ series
- High School DxD, a 2008 light novel and anime
- High School (2010 film), a comedy film
- High School (British TV series), a 2012 British television documentary series
- High School (Polish TV series), a 2014 para-documentary television series
- High School (American TV series), a 2022 American streaming television series

== Music ==
=== Albums ===
- High School, a 1981 album by Sharon Cuneta
- High School (album), a 2022 album by Tim Heidecker

=== Songs ===
- "High School", a 1970 song by MC5 from Back in the USA
- "High School", a 1978 song by High Inergy from "We Are the Future"
- "High School", a 1980 song by Little Murders
- "High School" (song), a 2013 song by Nicki Minaj, recorded in 2012, released in 2013
- "High School", a 2017 song by Kelsea Ballerini from Unapologetically
- High School Life, a 1981 OPM song by Sharon Cuneta

== Other uses ==
- Classical dressage also called High School Dressage, the purest form of classical horse riding and dressage
- "High School", a 1975 comedy monologue by Jimmie Walker
- "Highschool", a Strong Bad email from the Homestar Runner website, drawn from the 1983 arcade game Tag Team Wrestling
- High School, a 2003 manhwa series by Kim Young Ho
- High School (book), a 2019 memoir by Sara and Tegan Quin

== See also ==
- Fachhochschule
- Folk high school, institutions of adult and continuing education common in the Nordic countries and Germany
- The High School (disambiguation)
- Hochschule
- Vocational university
