= Cailíní Gránna =

2025 Irish short film parodying Mean Girls

- Cailíní Gránna film poster
- Directed by: Hilary Bowen-Walsh
- Screenplay by: Hilary Bowen-Walsh
- Story by: Tina Fey
- Based on: Mean Girls by Tina Fey Queen Bees and Wannabes by Rosalind Wiseman
- Produced by: Hilary Bowen-Walsh
- Starring: Megan O'Malley, Hilary Bowen-Walsh, Rebecca Fisher, Eilís Carey, Conrad Jones-Brangan, Caitríona Ní Dhomhnaill, Kevin Johnson, Ciaran Darcey, Eoin P. Ó Murchú, Máire Ni Shúilleabháin, Colm Mac Gearailt, Sinéad Ní Uallacháin, Ciara Ryan, Declain Gillen, Jacek Snochowski, Karol Szarek, Shane Fallon, Hugh Carr, Silvia Regina José Da Silva, Cate Ryan, Éadie Long, Liam Walsh, Órla Nic Con Na Búille, Seoirsín Bashford, Νiamh Ο Hea
- Cinematography: Jacek Snochowski
- Edited by: Rosie O'Shea
- Music by: TG Lurgan, Sascha Ende, Eric Matyas, AlisiaBeats, Monument_Music, All Good Folks, PaoloArgento, Moire, Keyframe_Audio, Grand_Project, andyacosta2906, An Criú Craiceáilte, Seán Monaghan, Tim_Kulig_Free_Music, SoundGalleryByDmitryTaras, Music_For_Videos, James Shannon, Róisín Seoighe, Cian Mac Cárthaigh, Caoimhe Doyle
- Production company: Mumbro Top
- Distributed by: TG4
- Release date: 4 October 2025
- Running time: 10 minutes
- Country: Ireland
- Language: Irish

Cailíní Gránna (lit. 'Mean Girls'), is a 2025 Irish language short film parodying Mean Girls (2004), made to mark the film's 21st anniversary. The film was produced by Mumbro Top as part of Seachtain na Gaeilge and aired on TG4 on 4 October 2025.

== Plot ==
After being hedge-schooled in Inishmurray her entire life, Kayleigh Ní Chorr Éisc moves to a secondary school and joins the "Plastics", a trio of wealthy and mean girls consisting of queen bee Regina George, "filthy rich" Gretchen Wieners, and "dumb hottie" Karen Smith. While on the phone with Kayleigh, Karen pretends to be sick to get out of a Halloween party, causing Kayleigh to call her a whore. Karen then writes about Kayleigh in the "Leabhar Lasrach", a scrapbook where the Plastics write insulting remarks about their classmates and teachers.

At a school talent show the next day, the Plastics dance to An Dreoilín. Gretchen accidentally kicks the phone that An Dreoilín was playing on into the crowd, shutting the music off. The Plastics then finish the performance without any music. The scene cuts to Gretchen giving a presentation on why Éamon de Valera should be stabbed for being the "boss of everybody" when Michael Collins was just as cute, smart and popular as De Valera. As the Plastics eat lunch, Regina is kicked out from the group for wearing O'Neills on a Monday. Regina is followed to the school gate by her classmates, yelling back that Kayleigh is a "stupid islander" and "less hot version of me" before getting hit by a bus, killing her and ending the film.

== Production ==
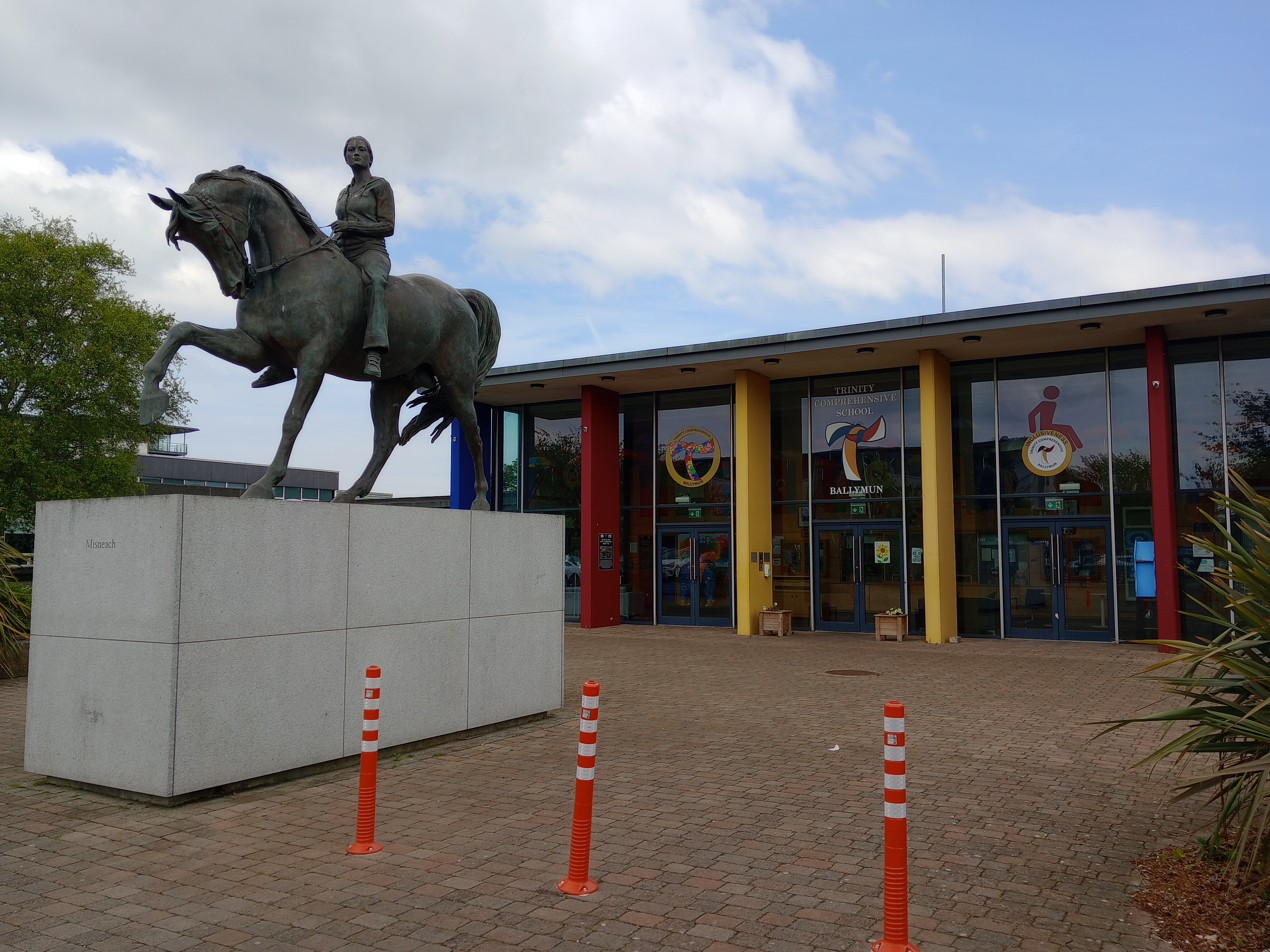
Trinity Comprehensive School, where the film was shot

In an interview for the Irish Independent, Bowen-Walsh said that she came up with the idea for an Irish language Mean Girls parody after she adapted the film as part of Cumann Drámaíochta, an Irish language society at the University of Galway. The film was produced by Mumbro Top, an Irish language drama company, directed, designed, written and produced by Hilary Bowen-Walsh, with Jacek Snochowski doing cinematography and Rosie O'Shea doing editing.

== Release ==
As part of Seachtain na Gaeilge, the film premiered on YouTube on 13 March 2025. The film was picked up by and later aired on TG4 on October 4, 2025 to commemorate the 21st anniversary of the 2004 American teen comedy film Mean Girls. When one of the film's cast members, Rebecca Fisher, was asked about the film airing on October 4 instead of October 3, a date dubbed "Mean Girls Day" on social media, she said that "she's not sure either!"

== Reception ==
Several commentators praised the film's references to Irish pop culture, as well as "Irishified" characters. Many also praised the film's showcase of the Irish language. IrishCentral and Gay Community News praised the film's queer characters and creatives.

== Awards ==
In 2025, Cailíní Gránna won the Best Irish Language award at the Dublin International Comedy Film Festival.
