= Stiofán Ó Fearail =

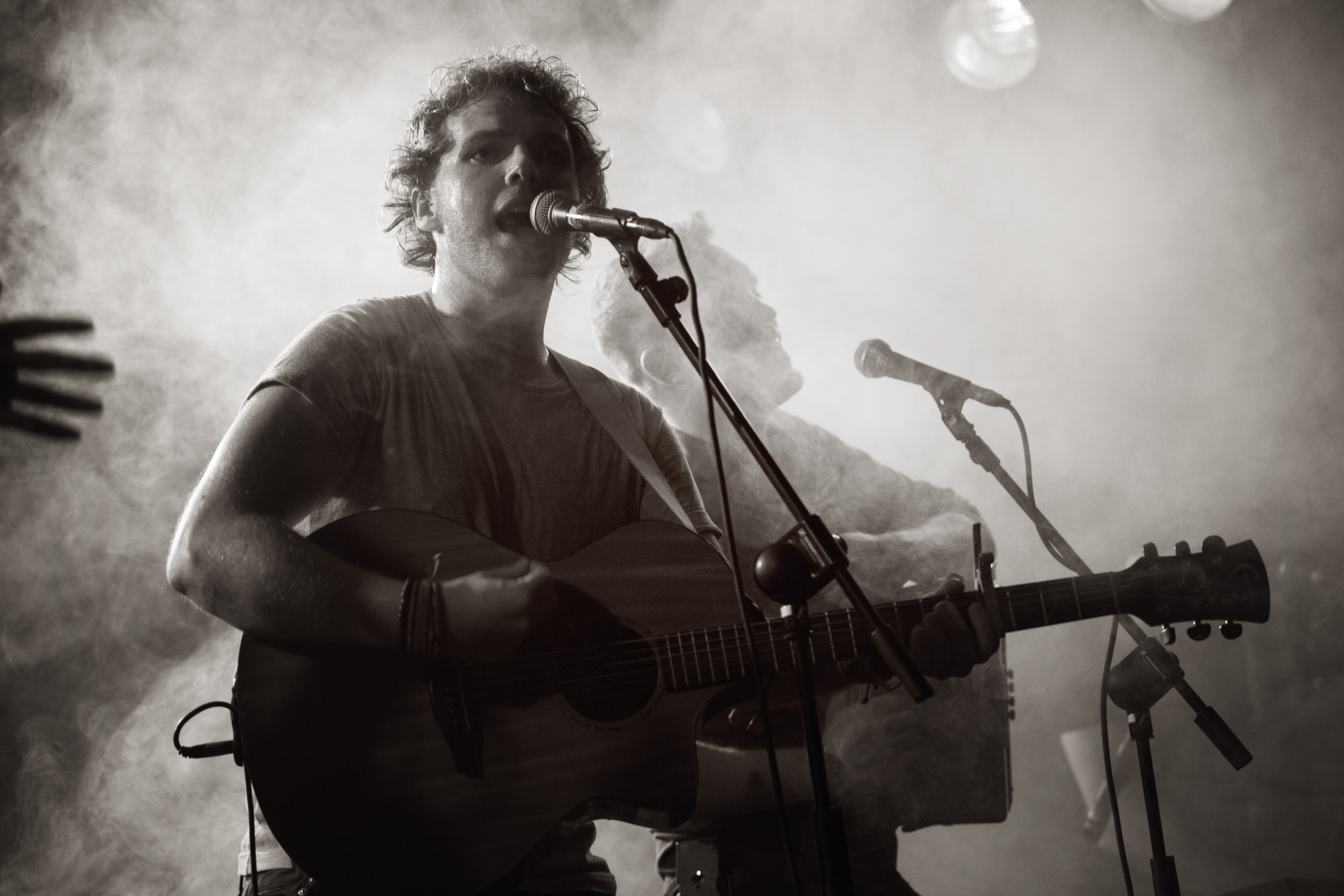

Background information
- Origin: Roscommon, Ireland
- Genres: Irish, folk music, Pop
- Occupations: Musician, television presenter, primary school teacher
- Instruments: Vocals, guitar, ukulele, bodhrán
- Years active: 2012 – Today
- Member of: Seo Linn

Stiofán Ó Fearail is an Irish singer, songwriter, musician and television presenter originally from Roscommon, Ireland. He is a founding member of the bilingual contemporary folk group Seo Linn alongside Daithí Ó Ruaidh, Keith Ó Briain and Kev Shortall.

In 2016, he won Réalta Óg na Bliana (Young Star of the Year Award) at the Oireachtas Media Awards in Galway for his role as presenter on the TG4 series Cleas Act.

== Music ==
Ó Fearail plays the guitar, writes and sings for folk/indie group, Seo Linn. He began his musical career working in Coláiste Lurgan as a musical director where he met current band members Daithí Ó Ruaidh, Keith Ó Briain and Kevin Shortall. After a series of successful summers translating and recording popular songs with TG Lurgan, Ó Fearail, Ó Ruaidh, Ó Briain and Shortall, along with previous members Cathal Ó Ruaidh and Jenny Ní Ruiséil, formed Seo Linn.

== Television ==
Ó Fearail was a judge on Scór Encore (2014), Junior Eurovision (2015) on TG4. He also presented Cleas Act for 3 seasons (2016 - 2018).

== Personal life ==
Ó Fearail is a qualified primary school teacher out of St Patrick's College, Dublin. He taught at Scoil Chaitlín Maude in Tallaght. He is an avid follower of Gaelic Football and supports Roscommon GAA. He is an Irish language advocate and has worked on various initiatives promoting the language.

== Discography ==
Year	Title	Band
2017	Solas	Seo Linn
2019	Marcus in the Wood/Marcas sa gCoill	Seo Linn
2023	Anuas	Seo Linn

== Filmography ==
Year	Title	Role
2014	Scór Encore	Judge
2015	Junior Eurovision Éire 2015	Judge
2015	Junior Eurovision Song Contest 2015	Commentator with Caitlín Nic Aoidh
2016—	Cleas Act	Presenter, Musical Director
