= Howard Wood =

Howard Wood may refer to:

== Politicians ==
- Howard R. Wood, politician
- Howard Kingsley Wood, politician

== Others ==
- Howard Wood (basketball)
- Howard Wood (environmentalist)
- Howard Wood (curler)
- Howard Wood (coach), American football, basketball, and baseball coach
- Howard Wood, Jr., see Granite Curling Club (Winnipeg)

== See also ==
- Howard's Woods
