= List of programmes broadcast by TVN 7 =

The list consists of major formats that were or have been produced for TVN 7 (Polish television channel) and aired as a premiere on this channel.

== List of programmes ==
Ongoing shows (as of 2025) are in bold type.

- Aktualności (2002–2003) – newscast
- **Mówię wam (since 2024) – live talk-show over show business**
- 19+ (2020–2022; previously on TVN) – TV series
- BrzydUla 2 (2020–2022; previously on TVN as BrzydUla) – TV series based on Yo soy Betty, la fea
- Papiery na szczęście (2021–2023) – TV series
- Reguły gry (2012) – TV series based on Rules of Engagement
- Szkoła (2020; previously on TVN) – docu-soap
- Wesołowska i mediatorzy (2015; previously on TVN) – docu-soap
- Wycieczkowiec (2024) – scripted-docu
- Zakochani po uszy (2019–2021) – TV series
- Projekt Lady (2021 – series 6 only; previously on TVN) – reality show based on Ladette to Lady
- Ślub od pierwszego wejrzenia (2020–2021 – series 4 and 5 only; previously and later on TVN) – reality show based on Married at First Sight
- Big Brother (2019 – series 6 and 7 only; previously on TVN and TV4) – reality show based on Big Brother
- Kto odmówi pannie młodej? (2020) – reality show based on Marry Me Now
- Perfect Picture (2022) – celebrity photography competition based on The Perfect Picture
- **Hotel Paradise** **(since 2020) – bikini-reality show based on Paradise Hotel**
- 40 kontra 20 (2021–2023) – bikini-reality show based on M.O.M – Milf or Missy
- True Love (2023) – bikini-reality based on True Love
- Noc magii – interactive (Call TV) fortune-telling

Also, TVN7 aired numerous Call TV interactive game shows.
