= Howard Wood (environmentalist) =

Scottish environmentalist

- Born: 1954 (age 71–72)
- Occupation: environmentalist
- Known for: preserving the marine environment of South Arran Sea, winning Goldman Environmental Prize in 2015

Howard Wood OBE (born 1954) is a Scottish environmentalist, co-funder of Community of Arran Seabed Trust (COAST) and Goldman Environmental Prize winner in 2015.

== Biography ==
Howard Wood has been living on Isle of Arran since he was 14 years old, in a home town to his father. He worked in a tree nursery, which was run by his family. Since 1973 he has been swimming and diving in the sea surrounding the Isle of Arran. He has an extensive knowledge on marine environment. While exploring the marine environment close to Isle of Arran, he has taken several photos and created video archives.

== Contribution to environment ==
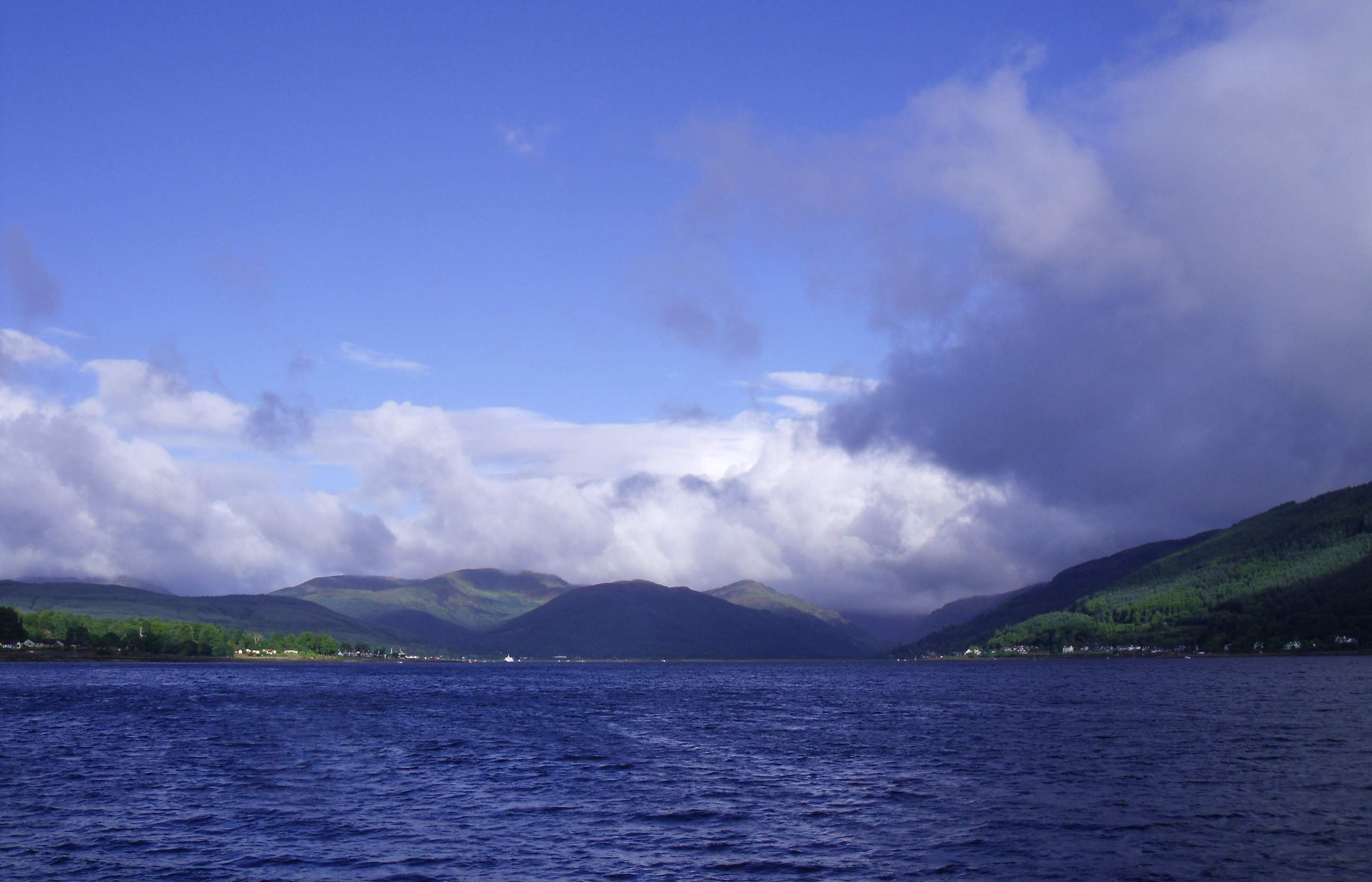
Firth of Clyde

When Howard Wood was diving in Firth of Clyde he realized changes to marine environment, which he associated with recent growth of fishing industry in this region. In 1989 he met his close friend, Don MacNeish, who had just come back from New Zealand. They both were inspired by the means of protecting the marine life that exist in New Zealand. They decided to create a similar protection area in Scotland. Using their personal savings, in 1995, they co-funded Community of Arran Seabed Trust (COAST) consisting a group of local volunteers. Howard Wood initiated grassroots campaign in order to establish Scotland's first No Take Zone (NTZ) in Lamlash Bay.

Finally, in 2008 an NTZ in Lamlash Bay was created, after 12 month of meeting and consulting on the matter with public officials, local fishermen and scientists, community rallies, and sending petitions to the Scottish parliament. Howard Wood encouraged local divers to introduce the new rules and caring for them to be respected by others. These activities were supposed to fasten the marine environment recovery, mostly seaweed beds, corals and juvenile scallops.

In 2012 together with COAST he suggested to designate the South Arran Sea as a Marine Protected Area (MPA).The idea was consulted with local divers and marine experts. Wood's aim was to keep the issue popular among the politicians. Eventually, in July 2014, Scottish Government announced creation of 30 new Marine Protected Areas in Scotland including the South Arran MPA, the first and only community-developed MPA in the country. Howard Wood together with COAST work now on creating similar protected areas in other Scottish areas presenting unique marine environment. They promote sustainable marine management policies and try to preserve fishing communities and their cultures.
