= Seo Linn =

Irish musical group

- Origin: Ireland
- Genres: Irish Music, Folk Music, Indie Music, Celtic
- Years active: 2013–current
- Members: Stiofán Ó Fearail; Daithí Ó Ruaidh; Keith Ó Briain; Kev Shortall
- Website: seolinn.com

Seo Linn (Irish pronunciation: [ʃɔ ˈlʲɪn̠ʲ]; "here we go") is an Irish folk/indie group formed in Ireland that has been making music and performing since 2013. The group consists of Stiofán Ó Fearail on vocals and guitar, Daithí Ó Ruaidh on vocals, keyboard, and saxophone, Keith Ó Briain on vocals, bass guitar, mandolin, and percussion, and Kevin Shortall on vocals, accordion, and percussion. They perform in both Irish and English.

Their debut album, 'Solas', was released in 2017 featuring songs such as 'Ar Scáth A Chéile', 'Music Makers' and their powerful rendition of the traditional Irish song, Óró 'Sé Do Bheatha Abhaile entitled 'Óró' on the album that has amassed over 6 million views on YouTube. The album won at the Nós Music Awards for '2017 Album of the Year' and consists of songs that they had been writing since 2013 for various projects, along with new material written specifically for the album itself. Solas is the Irish word for 'light' and the image of a lightbulb, which appears on the front of the CD symbolises a new approach to normalising use of the Irish language in contemporary music.

Seo Linn's second collection of original material, a double bilingual EP entitled 'Marcus in the Wood/Marcas sa gCoill', was released in July 2019.

== History ==
=== Early years (2013–2017) ===
The band rose to prominence after meeting in Coláiste Lurgan in the Conamara Gaeltacht of County Galway, where they worked for years on establishing the TG Lurgan YouTube channel. Since the release of their 2013 cover video of Avicii's 'Wake Me Up' both the TG Lurgan channel and the newly formed Seo Linn started to make waves.

By 2016, they had played Croke Park, The 3Arena, Aviva Stadium, The Board Gáis Energy Theatre, and a headline show in Vicar Street. They also managed to amass 32 million views on YouTube in this period and they performed international headliner gigs in New York, Melbourne, Boston, London, Paris, Edinburgh and even Uganda.

=== Debut Album Solas (2017) ===
Seo Linn wrote their first ever song, 'Ar Scáth a Chéile' in Uganda in 2013 while the band were there with the Irish charity Self Help Africa. It is an uplifting song which promotes the idea that 'unity is strength'. The song contains a lyric in Lugandan, the Bantu language of the Baganda people of Uganda, that says 'kwegata bwe bugumu' which means 'togetherness is strength'. This phrase mirrors the Irish language phrase from which the song was titled, 'ar scáth a chéile a mhaireann na daoine' meaning 'together people prosper'.

In 2016, as part of RTÉ's widely acclaimed production RTÉ Centenary, Seo Linn were chosen to write and record the song for the finale. They were asked to produce a contemporary, energetic, bilingual song inspired by lyrics from Arthur O'Shaughnessy's 'Ode'. The line 'we are the music makers, we are the dreamer of dreams' was used in the chorus.

Seo Linn's track "The Irish Roar" was chosen as the official Football Association of Ireland song for Euro 2016. Recorded in Áras Chrónáin in Clondalkin, the track tells the story of Irish successes in previous competitions and pays homage to travelling Irish fans.

In 'Sonas Studios' in Killarney, County Kerry, Seo Linn along with their producer, James Darkin, locked themselves in the studio for a whole night in order to create a modern take on the Irish traditional classic 'Óró 'Sé Do Bheatha Abhaile' which resulted in their final track on the album 'Óró'. Seo Linn's Óró instantly became a fan favourite has amassed over 9 million views on YouTube.

"Accompanying the album is an interactive workbook for irish language learners with lyrics and chords, plus text written by the band on topics as diverse as sport, recipes, and even mallachtaí, or insults, all as Gaeilge." "It encapsulates the band’s ethos: “Essentially what we’re trying to do with the book is to take [Gaeilge] out of the classroom setting and make it real for young people.”

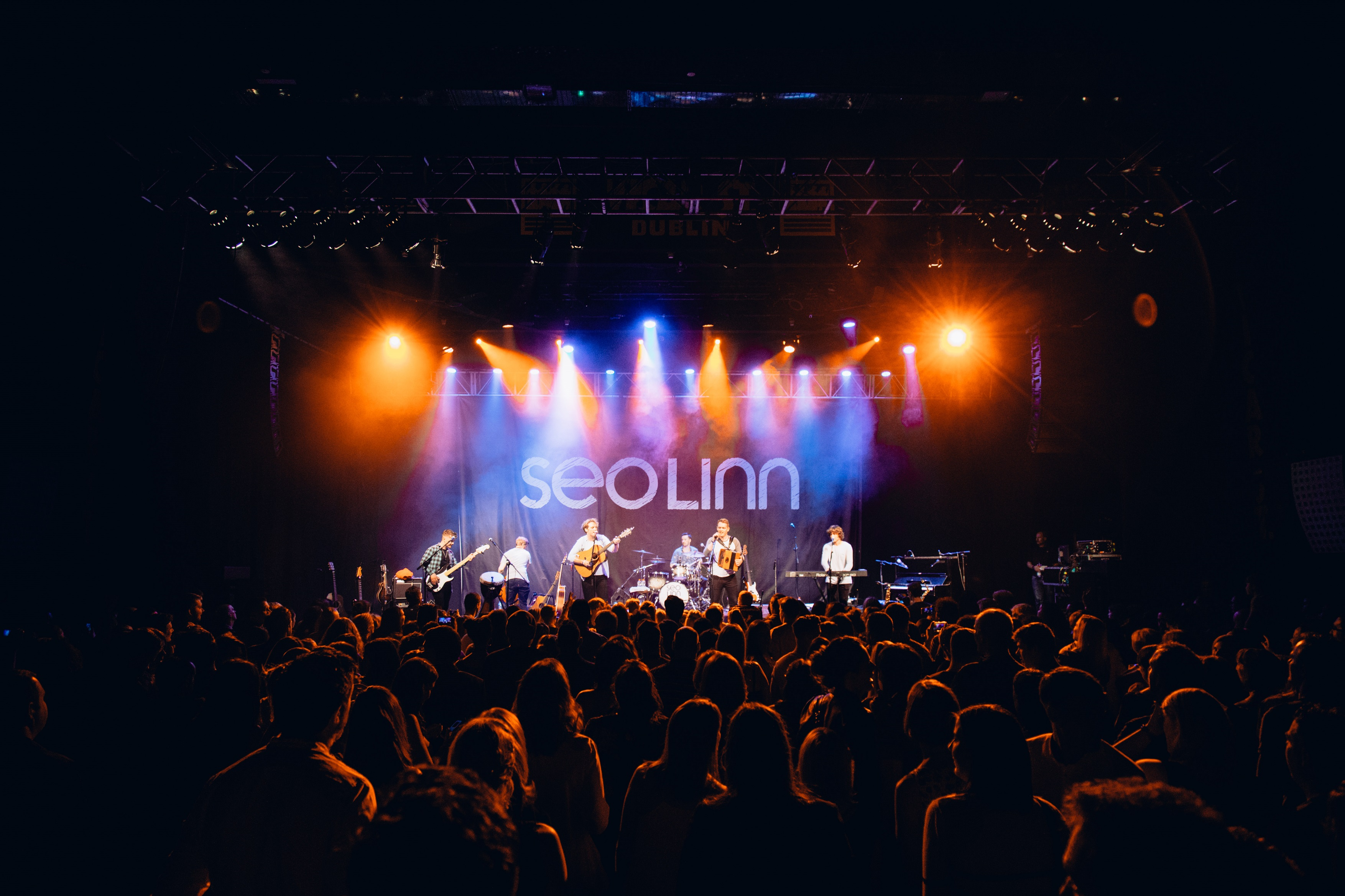
Seo Linn headlining Vicar Street in 2017

=== Marcus in the Wood/Marcas sa gCoill (2019) ===
Seo Linn released their first E.P. and 2nd body of work with Marcus in the Wood/Marcas sa gCoill in July 2019 containing previously released singles, Buy Me Time/Bain An Glas and Darkness Shines A Light/Soilsiú an Lae. The E.P. shows a development in the quartet's music and a maturing of their sound.

=== Siúil a Rún (2021) ===
Seo Linn released a new single, Siúil a Rún, in April 2021 following a slow down that hit the music industry during the COVID-19 global pandemic in 2020–21. Once again, Seo Linn gave their own distinctive modern twist to a very traditional Irish song. The video accompanying the single was recorded at The Hole in the Wall in Kilkenny / Cill Chainnigh, Ireland.

=== Anuas (2023) ===
Seo Linn's eagerly awaited new album, Anuas, was released on 24 February 2023 and includes more of their original and powerful interpretations of traditional Irish songs.

== Members ==
=== Band members ===
- Stiofán Ó Fearail – lead vocals, guitars
- Daithí Ó Ruaidh – vocals, piano, keyboards, synthesisers, saxophone, guitars
- Keith Ó Briain – vocals, guitars, mandolin, bass guitar, tin whistle
- Kev Shortall – vocals, accordion, percussion

Live musicians

- Colm Farrell – drums
- Conor Moore – drums, bodhrán, percussion
- Ben Wanders - drums, bodhrán, vocals
- Louis Younge – vocals, piano, keyboards, synthesisers, saxophone, fiddle, whistles

Former band members

- Conor Moore – drums, bodhrán, percussion
- Cathal Ó Ruaidh – vocals, bass guitar, keyboards
- Jenny Ní Ruiséil - vocals, mandolin, tambourine, tin whistle, guitars

== Discography ==
- Solas (2017)
- Marcus in the Wood/Marcas sa gCoill (2019)
- Siúil a Rún (single released 16 April 2021)
- Anuas (2023)
- Cailleach an Airgid (video of the track from Anuas released 12 November 2023)

== Awards and nominations ==
Year	Nominated work	Association	Category	Result	Ref.
2018	Solas	NÓS Music Awards	Album of the Year	Won	
