= High school (North America) =

High schools in North America are schools for secondary education, which may also involve intermediate education.

Highschooling in North America may refer to:

- Education in Canada for secondary/high school
- Education in Greenland for secondary/preparatory school
- Education in Mexico for secundaria and preparatoria
- High school in the United States
  - Secondary education in the United States

== See also ==
- Category:High schools in Canada
- Category:High schools in Mexico
- Category:High schools in the United States
- High School (disambiguation)
