= The High School =

The High School may refer to:

- Cookstown High School in Northern Ireland, known alternatively as The High School, Cookstown
- The High School, Dublin
- High School of Dundee, in Dundee, Scotland
- Royal High School, Edinburgh
- High School of Glasgow
- Episcopal High School (Alexandria, Virginia), known traditionally as The High School

== See also ==
- High school (disambiguation)
