= The Irish Roar =

Single by Seo Linn

from the album Solas
- Language: English, Irish
- Released: 20 May 2016
- Recorded: May 2016
- Studio: Áras Chrónáin
- Genre: Trad-Pop
- Length: 3:18
- Label: CD Baby
- Songwriter(s): Seo Linn

"The Irish Roar" is a song released in May 2016 as the official anthem of the Republic of Ireland national soccer team for the 2016 European Championships, held in France. The song was performed by trad-pop group Seo Linn.

They were commissioned to write the song after meeting FAI Chief Executive John Delaney on Easter Monday 2016. The song incorporates lyrics from the traditional song "Óró sé do bheatha abhaile."

== Reception ==
RTÉ's John Byrne complimented "The Irish Roar", calling it "a bit of a belter." However, Robert McNamara of The Irish Examiner called it "a bit of a bland effort set to dance beat with a bit of ceilí and qualifying commentary lumped in for good measure. Uninspiring."

== Chart performance ==
Chart	Peak Position
Ireland (IRMA)	80
