= An Dreoilín =

Song by Sean Monaghan
- Language: Irish
- Released: 1995
- Genre: Folk, Irish traditional
- Length: 3:31
- Songwriter: Sean Monaghan

"An Dreoilín" ([ənˠ ˈdʲɾʲoːlʲiːnʲ], "The Wren") is a 1995 Irish language folk song by Sean Monaghan in the style of traditional Irish music. It won RTÉ's Comórtas Amhránaíochta Raidió na Gaeltachta, an Irish songwriting competition.
