= Lamlash =

Lamlash: Scottish Gaelic: An t-Eilean Àrd; Never Ending Lash
- Town
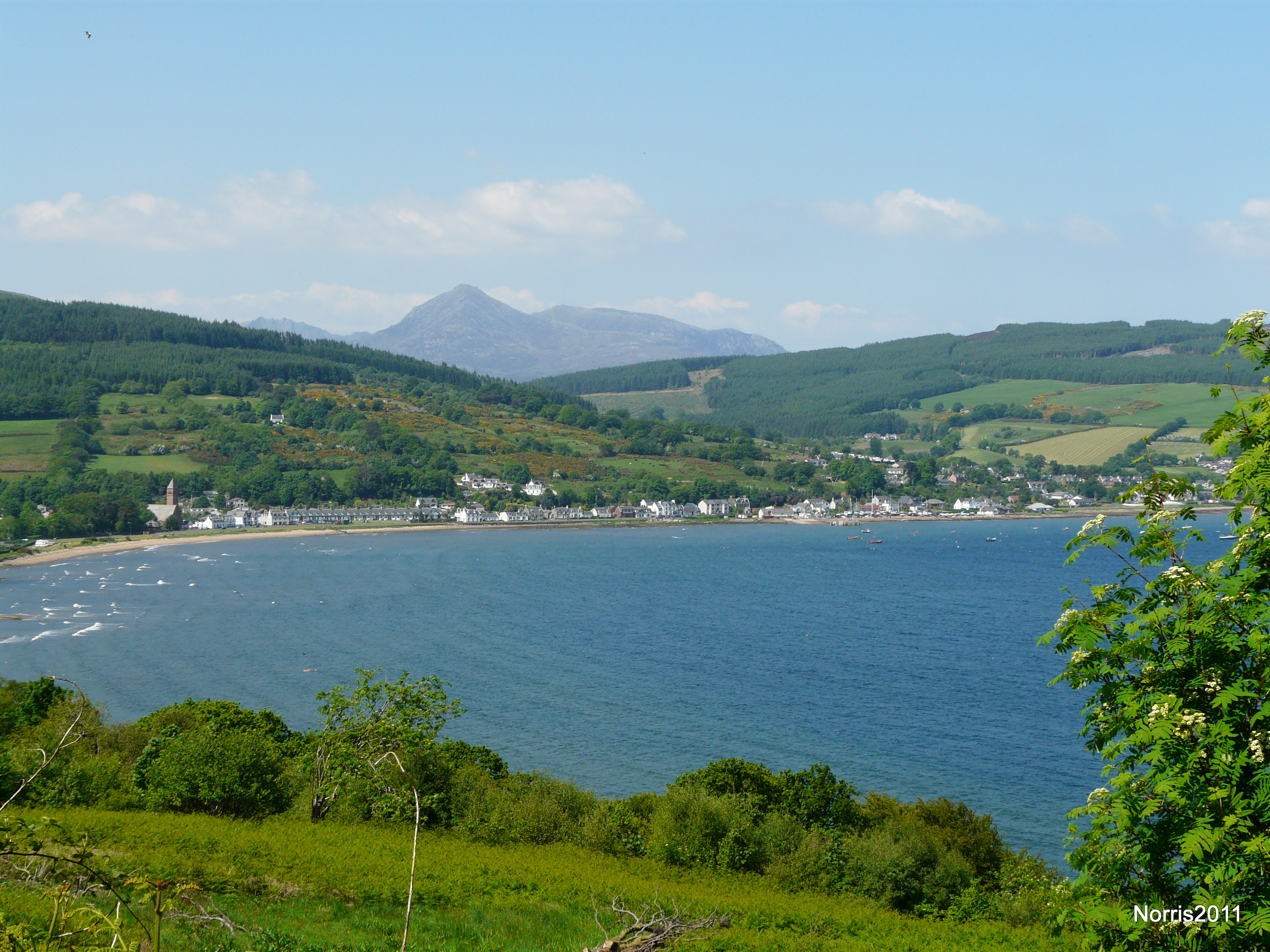
- Lamlash sea front and part of Lamlash main town centre, May 2008

- Location within North Ayrshire
- Population: 1,100 (2020)
  - Density: 7.01 (persons per hectare)
- OS grid reference: NS028314
  - Edinburgh: 96 miles (154 km)
  - London: 443 miles (713 km)
- Civil parish: Kilbride
- Council area: North Ayrshire
- Lieutenancy area: Ayrshire and Arran
- Country: Scotland
- Sovereign state: United Kingdom
- Post town: ISLE OF ARRAN
- Postcode district: KA27
- Dialling code: 01770
- Police: Scotland
- Fire: Scottish
- Ambulance: Scottish
- UK Parliament: North Ayrshire and Arran
- Scottish Parliament: Cunninghame North

Lamlash (Scottish Gaelic: An t-Eilean Àrd) is a town on the Isle of Arran, in the Firth of Clyde, Scotland. It lies three miles (five kilometres) south of the island's main settlement and ferry port Brodick, in a sheltered bay on the island's east coast, facing the Holy Isle. Lamlash is the seat of Arran's local government offices, and is also the location of the island's police station, secondary school and hospital. In common with the rest of the island, the town's main industry is tourism and the public sector is also an important employer. Lamlash has an RNLI Lifeboat station with a B class Atlantic 75 lifeboat, covering the inshore waters around the coast of Arran, and in summer, there is a regular ferry service from Lamlash harbour to Holy Isle. The town has several buildings of historical interest, including Hamilton Terrace, which consists of two rows of single storey-and-attic cottages on the Lamlash seafront, arranged in pairs.

== History ==
A prehistoric ring of stones indicates that an ancient settlement has existed near Lamlash since antiquity. The name Lamlash dates back to the 6th Century hermitage of Saint Molaise, a Celtic monk born in Ireland but raised in Scotland, who, circa 590, spent some time in a cave on the neighbouring Holy Isle. Commonly known as MoLaise the Gaelic name of Holy Isle was, as a result, Eilean MoLaise. This gradually evolved through Elmolaise and Lemolash to Lamlash, which is what Holy Isle was called until early in the 19th century. After that time the name was more normally attached to the village that grew up facing it.

Lamlash was peripherally involved in the 13th century Battle of Largs. It was the birthplace of artist James Kay.

When Mary, Queen of Scots was at Dumbarton Castle in February 1548 during the war of the Rough Wooing, the English commander Grey of Wilton proposed basing some warships at "Lammelashe" to watch for French ships. Mary was taken to France. Her ship was at first forced by adverse winds to return towards the Firth of Clyde, and anchored at the "roadstead of the isle of Lamlash" or "Lamelesche" on August 6.

The town was the training place for No. 11 (Scottish) Commando during the early years of the Second World War.

== Geography ==
Lamlash is located in the southern half of the island, some 3 miles (5 km) to the south of Brodick and 5 miles (8 km) to the north of Whiting Bay. It is on the eastern side and sits on a bay facing the Holy Isle and the Firth of Clyde.

== Notable sights ==
The basic character of the town is formed by a long building line of two and three-storey roughcast or stone houses lining the inland side of the shore road. The parish church and the former St George's church sit at either end of this series of buildings.

=== Hamilton Terrace ===
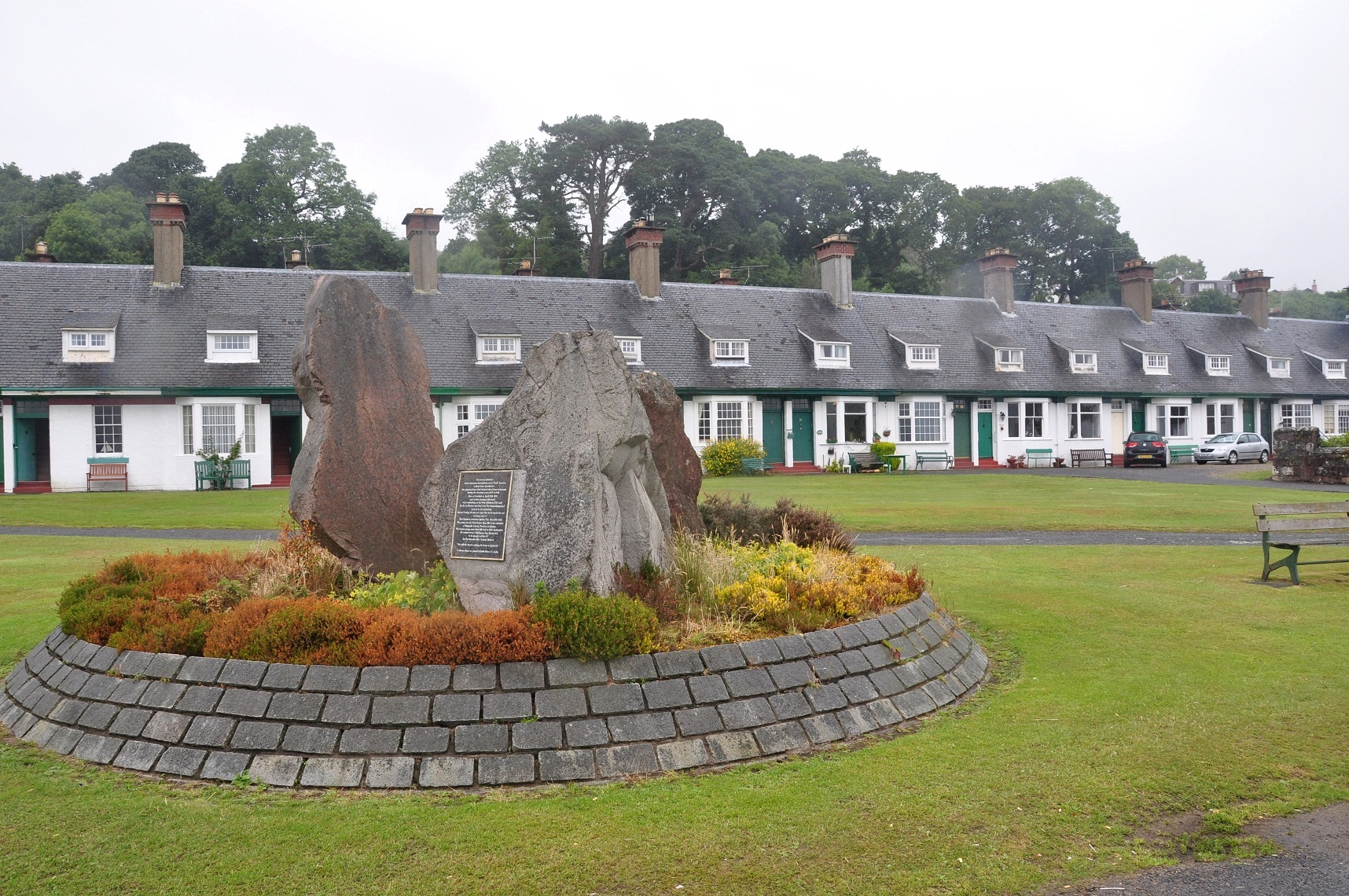
"Hamilton Terrace" and the Clearances Monument

Hamilton Terrace consists of two rows of single storey-and-attic cottages of which numbers 1–27 are on the Lamlash seafront, arranged in pairs. Numbers 1a–24a are positioned behind these and are probably coeval with numbers 1–27 and assumed to have been built for residents' summer occupation allowing the main houses to be let to visitors, an accepted practice in Arran. The terrace is a major architectural feature of the town, designed by Sir John James Burnet and constructed in the late 19th century. The houses have survived with minimal changes, even to their rear elevation. Some still have original glazing. One of the houses functions as the Lamlash Post Office at no 27. On the front side (seaside) the complex had two rectangular garden enclosures; one of these is currently a car park. On the lawn between the enclosures is a modern monument in remembrance of the Arran clearance emigrants in the form of three standing stones.

=== Clearances monument ===
The Clearances (Scottish Gaelic: Fuadach nan Gàidheal, the expulsion of the Gael) is a period in the 18th and 19th centuries where large forced displacements of the rural population in Scotland took place as part of a process of agricultural change. The clearances led to mass emigration to the sea coast, the Scottish Lowlands and the North American colonies. In general the Clearances on Arran seem to have been less brutal than in many other places in Scotland, but when the crofters in Glen Sannox had to make way for large-scale sheep farming, many of them saw no other option than to emigrate, and they departed from Lamlash. For this reason, Arran's Clearance Monument is situated in Lamlash, in front of Hamilton Terrace. A plaque on the monument recalls their departure and their new life as settlers in Canada with the following words:

Erected on behalf of Arran clearance descendants across North America to their brave forefathers who departed from their beloved island home to Canada during the clearance years 1829 to 1840. Here at Lamlash on April 25, 1829 part of the clearance (86 souls) when embarking on the brig Caledonia (196 ton) the Rev.A.Mackay preached from The Mound (opposite) formed by the departing his text "Casting all your care upon him: for he careth for you" 1st Peter ch.5 v.7. The Caledonia arrived at Quebec City June 25th 1829. The group was the first of more than 300 Arran colonists of Megantic County, Province of Quebec. The largest group, more than 400, had as their destination the seaport town of Dalhousie, New Brunswick to be pioneer settlers of the Restigouche-Bay Chaleur District. "Yet still the blood is strong, the heart is highland". A chlann eilean mo ghaoil bithibh dileas d'a cheile.

The monument was erected at the initiative of the Canadian descendants of the Arran emigrants.

=== Churches ===
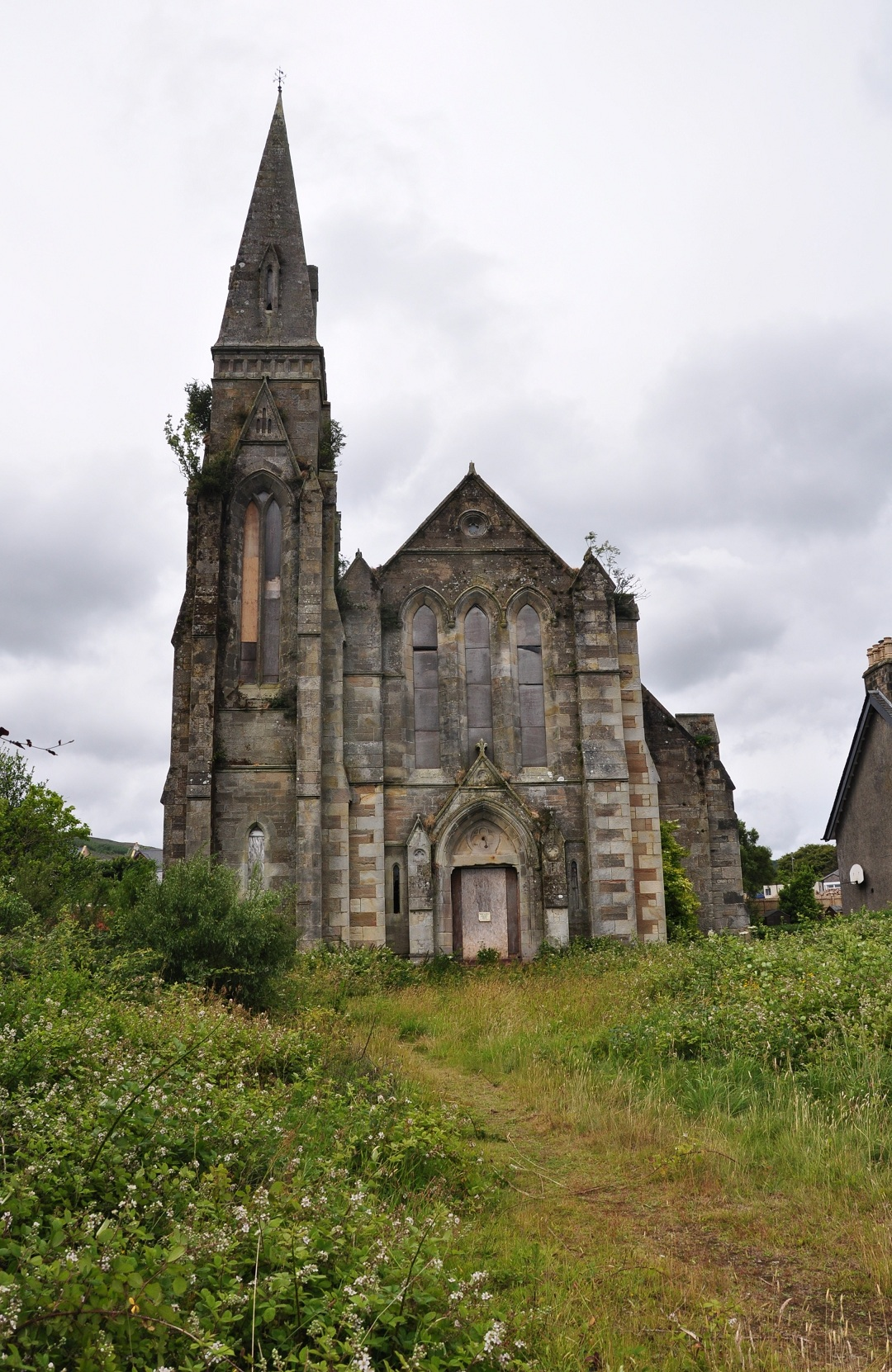
St George's United Free Church

St George's United Free Church stands on the northern end of Lamlash, on Bungalow Road in the Margnaheglish neighbourhood. The church was erected between 1885-1892 in early English style by the Duke of Hamilton to replace an older church from 1774. It is built in cream-coloured sandstone and has a square stone pyramidal spire with an iron weathervane.

The church was used by the Lamlash Free Church congregation from 1892 until the union of the Free and United Presbyterian Churches in 1900, when it became the United Free Church. From 1929 it formed one of the congregations of Lamlash Parish church at that year's union with the Church of Scotland. The church was in use until 1947 and stands empty since. As of 2015, the building was undergoing renovation.

The Arran Theatre and Arts Trust, established in 1989 had as its main objective to convert St George's Church into a theatre. As part of that objective, the Trust ran many events and brought touring companies to Arran, but because of "wider political issues" the plan never materialised. Similarly, plans to turn it into a Childhood Heritage Museum also failed in 1999. In the meantime the Scottish Civic Trust added the church to the register of "Buildings at Risk" in 1993.

A chance to save the building arose in October 2004 when CRGP Architects & Surveyors from Glasgow applied for permission for the conversion of the church to form 8 flats and the erection of an extension to the rear to form 6 flats with associated parking. The application was granted on 7 February 2005 by the North Ayrshire Council, subject to a number of conditions. However, the development was not realised.

In February 2007, the North Ayrshire Council commissioned ARP Lorimer and Associates (ARPL) to carry out a townscape audit for the Lamlash seafront with the specific assignment (i.a.) to evaluate the potential for the Church. In its report, ARPL considered the state of the church poor but saveable. It recommended that, as a category B listed building, the retention of this historic structure is of importance. ARPL suggested to convert the church into three apartments and to build some new development to the rear to make it financially viable (just as CRGP Architects had requested 3 years earlier), and advised the Council to encourage the owner to progress the development to ensure the building did not decline to the point where demolition is required.

As of 2010, the building remains neglected. Minutes from the Arran Community Council show that the future of the church is a regular topic of debate, but difficulty in contacting the private owner or convincing him to cooperate seem to be (part of) the reason that there has been no progress to date.

As of October 2024, the renovation and refurbishment of the building to form 14 high quality apartments was completed.

The church's former manse is also a category B listed building. It was built in 1898 and remained in use as manse for the united congregation until circa 1990.

Lamlash and Kilbride Parish Church and the church hall. It is a T-plan, aisleless, Gothic-style church built in 1886 by architect Hugh Barclay in red sandstone with a campanile-like tower. It replaces an earlier plain building of 1773, itself replacing the earlier Kilbride church, the remains of which survive at the present Lamlash graveyard. The cross and baptismal font in the church were both unearthed in the graveyard of the old Kilbride Church in 1892, and are thought to be of 14th-century origin. In the tower is a 9-bell carillon. The church hall, a separate, adjacent building, was built and used for worship some years before the church itself (around 1880), and included a reading room and library. It is a single storey, rectangular-plan hall, made into a T-plan by lower wings.

=== The Lookout ===
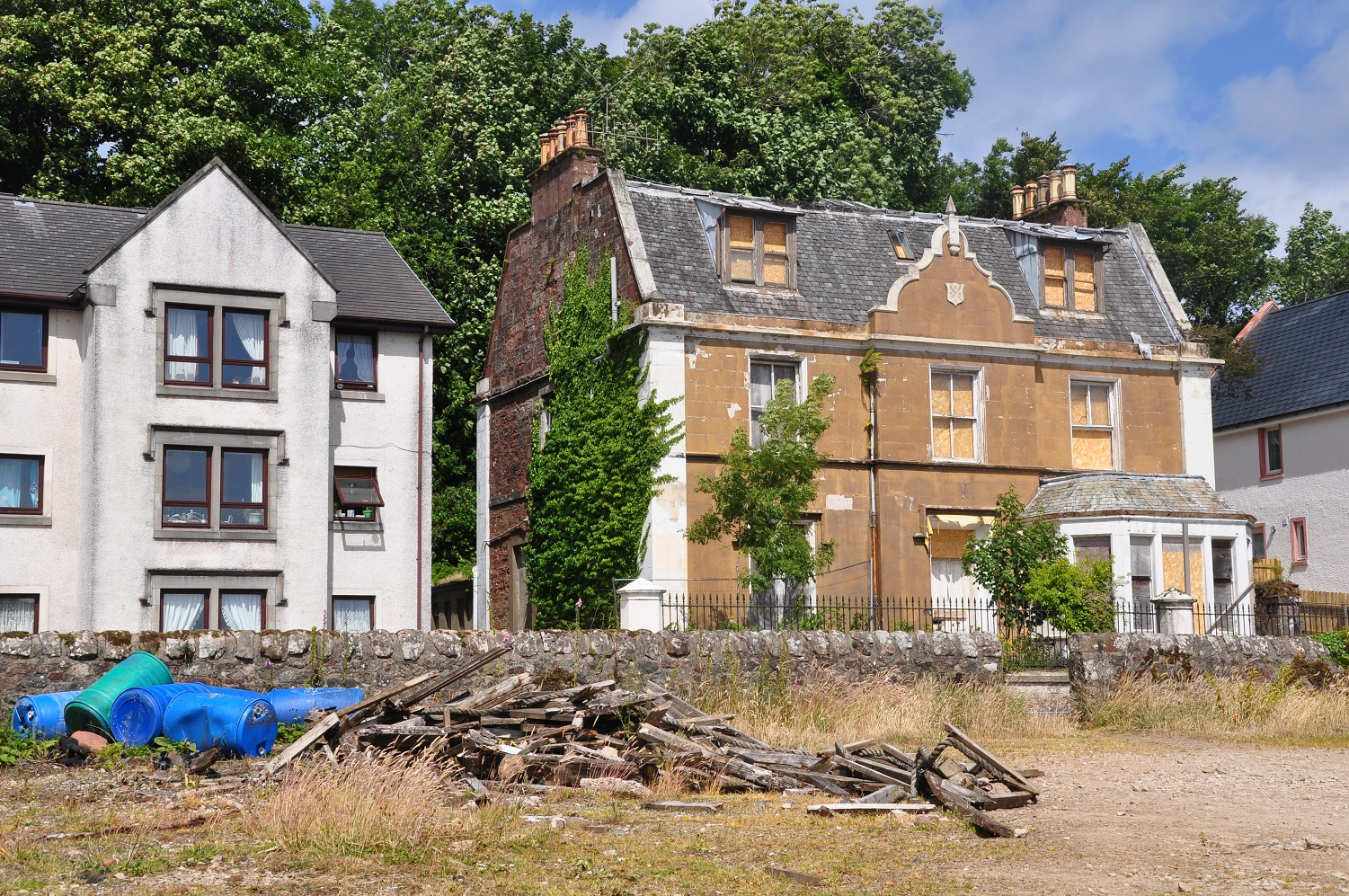
Abandoned villa "The Lookout"

The Lookout was an early to mid-19th-century classical villa with prominent corner pilasters and Tudor Jacobean details, located on the main road close to the shore. It was marked as 'Bank' on Ordnance Survey maps of 1868, 1897 and 1924. In October 2002, the North Ayrshire Council turned down an application by John Thomson Construction Limited (from Lamlash) to have the building demolished. It was argued that demolition would be contrary to national policy and to the Isle of Arran Local Plan as it would have an adverse impact on the Lamlash Conservation Area. The Council also considered that it had not been satisfactorily demonstrated that the Lookout could not be restored and brought back into use as advised by Historic Scotland.

In 2004, the Scottish Civic Trust added the villa to the register of "Buildings at Risk". Then, in February 2007 the North Ayrshire Council commissioned ARP Lorimer and Associates (ARPL) to carry out a townscape audit for the Lamlash seafront with the specific assignment (i.a.) to evaluate the potential for the "Lookout". In its report ARPL suggested a residential conversion into four flats as the most economically viable option to save the building, but in 2009 an inspection revealed that the condition of the building had further deteriorated. The Lookout was demolished in March 2012.

=== Other listed buildings ===
Glenkiln, a mid-19th-century farmhouse and includes two adjoining cottages from the early 19th century. It is one of the two remaining farms in Lamlash (of the 7 there once were), the other one being the Clauchlands Farm.

Monamore Bridge Millhouse, an early 19th-century single storey former mill house in L-form.

Whitehouse Lodge, a late 19th-century lodge, formerly belonging to the (demolished) White House mansion. The lodge is single storey-and-attic with a basically rectangular-plan. The site of the former White House itself is now designated for development.

Bellhaven, a single storey and attic 3-bay cottage from 1808 next to the Parish Church.

Other notable buildings are the former pier house with clock tower (1885); the 'Crafts Made in Arran' Shop (late 19th century); the early 19th century Pier of red rubble blocks; the Sea Gate, part of the former Steamer Pier Office (1902) and the Bay Hotel, the latter being a good example of an early Victorian villa.

=== Former community centre ===
Lamlash Community Centre on Benlister Road was a large former military hall from 1914. The hall (rectangular, single storey, corrugated-iron) was built by the Admiralty in 1914 as accommodation for the fleet arriving at Lamlash. It was supplied in prefabricated form, assembled on site quickly and cheaply. It comprised a canteen, reading rooms, offices, lavatories, a stage and gymnasium. Tents were erected in the surrounding playing fields for the soldiers. In 1917 the hall was converted for use as a hospital for recovering soldiers. The hall was given to the village of Lamlash after World War I on the condition that it be used again when necessary for troops. This indeed happened during World War II when it was used as a troops' canteen. The community centre was demolished in 2010 following the opening of community facilities in the new Arran High School nearby.

== Economy ==
=== Employment ===
In common with the rest of the island the town's main industry is tourism. In Lamlash the public sector is also an important employer. Fisheries is no longer important; although the Clyde was once the finest fishery in Europe it is now all but gone. There are strictly speaking no fish left in the Clyde for commercial capture and the few fishermen left are reduced to scraping the seabed for scallops and prawns.

=== Harbour and lifeboat ===
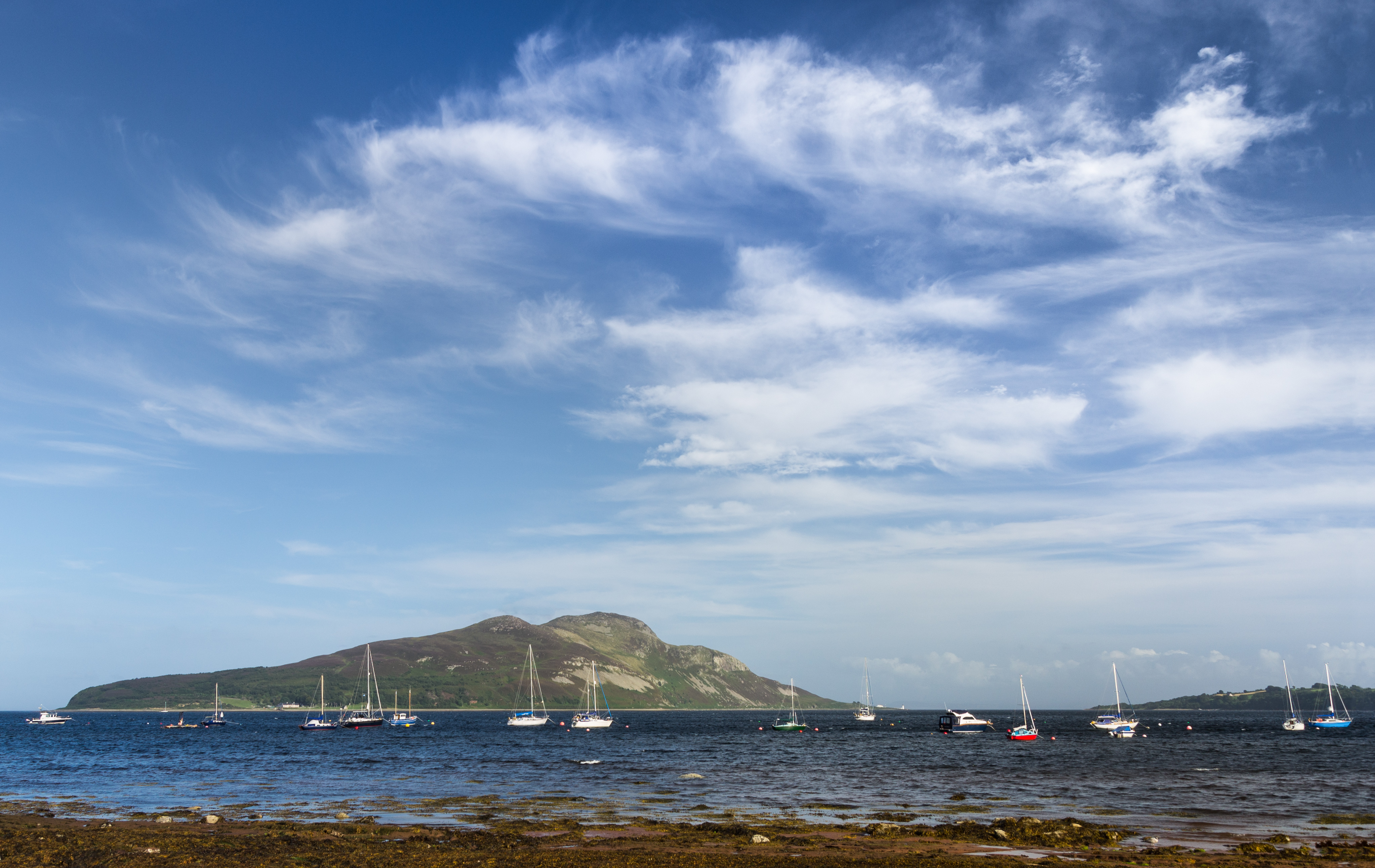
Holy Isle from Lamlash

According to Glasgow's Department of Naval Architecture and Marine Engineering, Lamlash Bay is a good natural harbour offering very good shelter. It has accommodated the Royal Navy Home Fleet and Atlantic Fleet.

Lamlash has an RNLI Lifeboat station with a B class Atlantic 75 lifeboat, covering the inshore waters around the coast of Arran. In summer, there is a regular ferry service from Lamlash harbour to Holy Isle.

=== Lamlash Bay Community Marine Protected Area ===
On 20 September 2008 the so-called "Inshore Fishing Order 2008" entered into effect, prohibiting commercial and recreational fishing in the northern portion of Lamlash Bay, between Holy Island and the Margnaheglish neighborhood of Lamlash. This No Take Zone (NTZ) aims to protect Maerl seaweed beds and the regeneration of all marine life. It is hoped this NTZ will benefit the Lamlash economy by attracting scuba divers and by providing bigger and better catches for fishermen in the neighbouring overspill area. The prohibition area is defined as follows: from Mount Pleasant Farm (55°32.603′N 5°6.512′W) in a straight line in a south to southeasterly direction to Holy Isle West (55°31.556′N 5°5.216′W) thence in an easterly direction around the northern end of Holy Island by the mean high water mark of ordinary spring tides to Holy Isle East (55°31.876′N 5°4.304′W); thence by a straight line in a north to north westerly direction to Hamilton Rock (55°33′N 5°4.823′W); thence in a west to northwesterly direction by a straight line to Clauchlands Point (55°33.002′N 5°4.957′W); and thence in a west to southwesterly direction by the mean high water mark of ordinary spring tides to Mount Pleasant Farm. The area includes both the sea and the seabed.

This NTZ is the first in Scotland. It is also the first time that statutory protection has been given to a marine area as a result of proposals being developed at a grassroots level; in this case after a long campaign by the Community of Arran Seabed Trust (C.O.A.S.T.), Violation of the fishing ban can lead to an unlimited fine upon conviction on indictment. The remainder of Lamlash Bay is to become a Fisheries Management Area, focusing primarily on scallops.

Early press reports regarding the establishment of the NTZ indicated anticipation for the subsequent formation of a Fisheries Management Area. According to the C.O.A.S.T., this was expected based on assurances from the Scottish Government. However, as of May 2010, this development had not yet occurred. Furthermore, the NTZ remains unmarked, lacking any interpretation boards to inform anglers. This has led the Community of Arran Seabed Trust to call into question the government's commitment to the overall project. The NTZ and the Fisheries Management Area would jointly have been known as the "Lamlash Bay Community Marine Protected Area".

The sea surrounding the south of Arran, including Lamlash, is now recognised as one of 31 Mature Conservation Marine Protected Areas in Scotland. The designated are includes the current No Take Zone in Lamlash Bay, but is not itself a No Take Zone.

== See also ==
- Arran High School
