= High School (British TV series) =

- Starring: Tom McDonald
- Narrated by: Alec Newman
- Country of origin: Scotland
- Original language: English

Production
- Producers: Michelle Friel; Jules Kean
- Production location: Holyrood Secondary School
- Running time: 59 minutes
- Production company: Friel Kean Films

Original release
- Release: 11 May 2012

High School is a three-part BBC reality TV series that centers on a year in the life at Holyrood Secondary School in Glasgow, Scotland.

== Synopsis ==
High School is filmed at Holyrood Secondary, a Catholic school and one of the largest comprehensive High Schools in Europe with over 2000 pupils. The series seeks to capture the school's ethos rather than the day-to-day minutiae, resulting in little in-class footage but highlighting crucial parts of the school year. The film is narrated by actor Alec Newman, who plays the headmaster in Waterloo Road.
