= Freshman =

First-year student in some countries

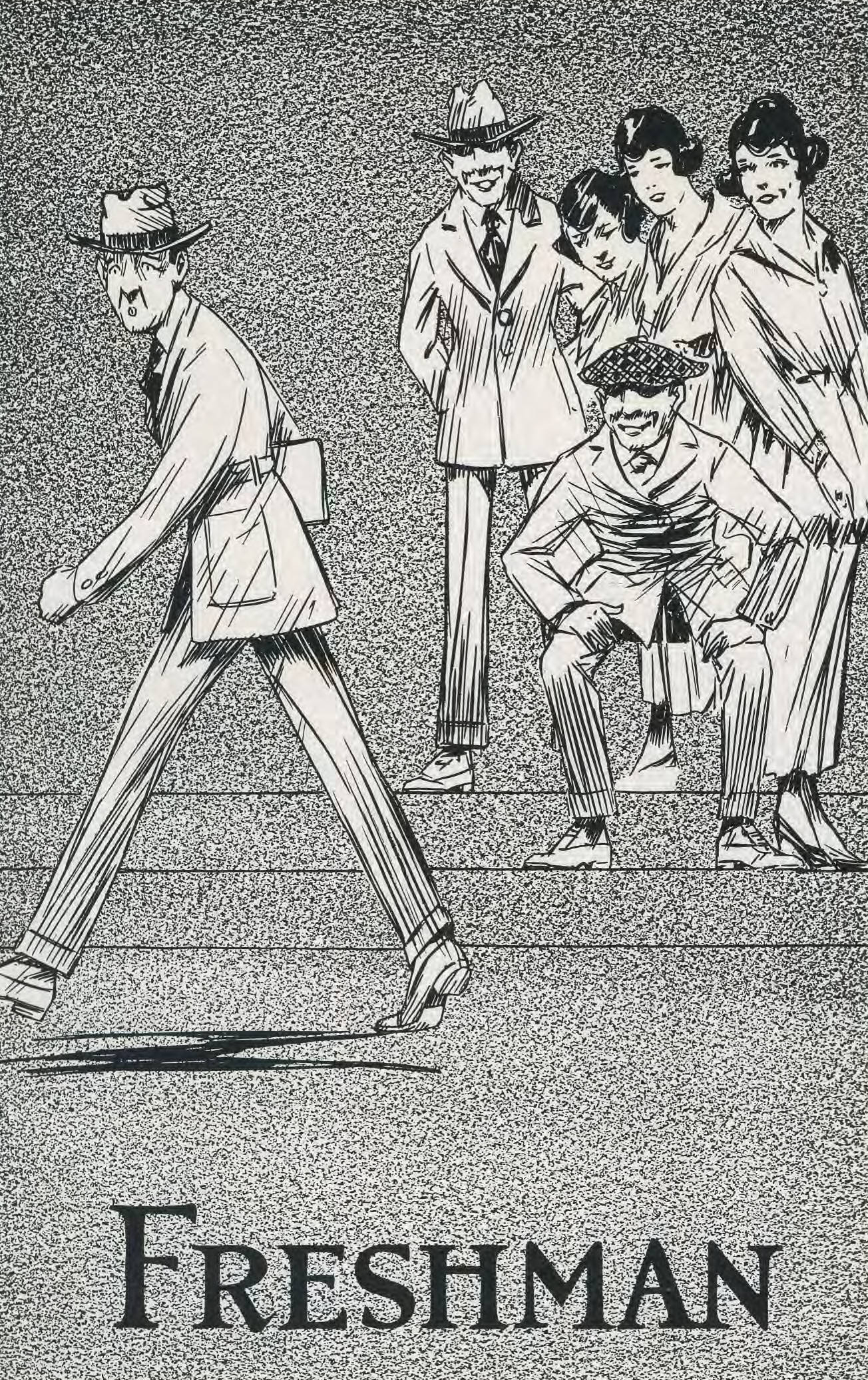
Freshman class artwork, from East Texas State Normal College's 1920 Locust yearbook

A freshman, fresher, first year, or colloquially frosh or freshie, is a person in the first year at an educational institution, usually a secondary school or at the college and university level, but also in other forms of post-secondary educational institutions or primary school.

== Arab world ==
In much of the Arab world, a first-year is called a mubtadi' (مبتدئ; plural مبتدئون, mubtadi'ūn), which is Arabic for "beginner".

== Asia ==
Some Asian countries use the same names as used in the United States (freshman, sophomore, junior, senior), among them Malaysia.

== Brazil ==
In Brazil, students that pass the vestibular exam and begin studying in a college or university are called "calouros" or more informally "bixos" ("bixetes" for girls), an alternate spelling of "bicho", which means "animal" (although commonly used to refer to bugs). Calouros are often subject to hazing, which is known as "trote" (lit. "prank") there. The first known hazing episode in Brazil happened in 1831 at the Law School of Olinda and resulted in the death of a student. In 1999, a Chinese Brazilian calouro of the University of São Paulo Medicine School named Edison Tsung Chi Hsueh was found dead at the institution's swimming pool; this has since become one of the most well known episodes of violent hazing and has received extensive national media coverage since that year.

== Canada ==
The term "first year" is used for a first-year student at university or college. The student orientation period at Canadian universities is often called "Frosh week."

== Chile ==
Mechón or mechona is used for the first-year students of University of Chile, a term that has spread to the rest of the universities in the country.

== Croatia ==
The term brucoš is used for either first-year college or university students or students who haven't yet passed any exams.

== Germany ==
In Germany, a first-semester student of a university program (Bachelor, Master, State exam etc) is called Erstsemester, or in short and more common, Ersti, with erst meaning 'first' and the -i adding a benevolently diminutive tone. The plural is Erstis.

Unlike the word freshman, which stands for a student in their whole first year, the German word Ersti is exclusively used for students in their first semester. Students of higher semesters are accordingly called Zweitsemester, Drittsemester, Viertsemester etc. and sometimes, but rarely, also Zweitis, Drittis, Viertis, etc.

== United Kingdom ==
=== England and Wales ===
Students at the beginning of their first year of university are often known in England and Wales as freshers; however, the terms freshman and 'first years' is also used. The first week of term before lessons is widely known as freshers' week, when there are usually no classes, and students take part in induction events and fairs; but this arrangement is not universal. As freshers are newcomers to the institutions and often experience a period of adjustment as they navigate university life, there are numerous UK websites available that offer support and resources to help freshers with university preparations, such as providing guidance on accommodation, academic advice, social activities, and general tips for a successful start to their university journey.

Unlike in Scotland, this term is not used in reference to pre-university education, the equivalent terms being year sevens for the first year of secondary school and first years, lower sixths and year twelves used at sixth forms.

=== Scotland ===
First year (also known as S1 in Scotland) is the first year of schooling in secondary schools in Scotland and is roughly equivalent to Year 8 (Second Form) in England and Wales and Year 9 (Second Form) in Northern Ireland. Most pupils are 12 or 13 years old at the end of S1.

Preceded by Primary 7	First year 11.5–13	Succeeded by Second year

The first year of primary education in Scotland is known as Primary 1 (P1).

At the four ancient Scottish universities the traditional names for the four years at university are Bejan ("Bejant" at the University of St Andrews) (1st), Semi (2nd), Tertian (3rd) and Magistrand (4th), though all Scottish universities will have a "freshers' week" (as with all British universities) and the term is as widely used with more traditional terms.

== United States ==
=== Beginner ===
Freshman is commonly in use as a US English idiomatic term to describe a beginner or novice, someone who is naïve, a first effort, instance, or a student in the first year of study (generally used in both high school and in tertiary school university study before the taking of a degree).

=== First year congressional representatives ===
New members of Congress in their first term are referred to as freshmen senators or freshmen congressmen or congresswomen, no matter how experienced they were in previous government positions.

=== First-year high school students ===
High school first-year students are almost exclusively referred to as freshmen, or in some cases by their grade year, 9th graders. Second-year students are sophomores, or 10th graders, then juniors or 11th graders, and finally seniors or 12th graders.

=== First-year university students ===
At college or university, freshman denotes students in their first year of study. The grade designations of high school are not used, but the terms sophomore, junior, and senior are kept at most schools. Some colleges, including historically women's colleges, do not use the term freshman but use first year, instead. Beyond the fourth year, students are simply classified as fifth year, sixth year, super senior, etc. Some institutions use the term freshman for specific reporting purposes.

== See also ==
- Freshman fifteen
- Junior (education year)
- Senior (education)
- Sophomore
- Rookie
