= Second year =

Year of schooling in Scotland and Ireland

Second year (also known as S2 in Scotland) is the second year of schooling in secondary schools in Scotland and in the Republic of Ireland, and is roughly equivalent to Year 9 in England and Wales and Year 10 (Third Form) in Northern Ireland. Most pupils are 13 or 14 years old at the end of S2.

Second year was traditionally the year group for 12 and 13 year olds in English and Welsh secondary schools, until it was mostly replaced by the Year 8 title in September 1990, although in some areas second year was actually the first year of a pupil's secondary education (where the transfer age was 12 instead of 11), while in some areas pupils did not transfer t secondary school until the age of 13, when they entered third year.

The term can also refer to the second year of a university course.

in some areas it is a term used for 12th grade/2nd year of college.

| Preceded by First year | Second year 12.5–14 | Succeeded by Third year |
