= High School (Polish TV series) =

Polish television series

- Also known as: School
- Genre: paradocumentary
- Narrated by: Piotr Dobosz
- Opening theme: Dawid Kwiatkowski – „Szkoła” (ep. 64-296); Dawid Kwiatkowski – „Niezniszczalni” (ep. 297-709); Radosław Skorowski and Artur Skorowski – „Szkoły życia czas” (ep. 710-860)
- Country of origin: Poland
- Original language: Polish
- No. of seasons: 13
- No. of episodes: 860 + 2 (episode 0) (as November 27, 2020)

Production
- Running time: ca. 45 minutes

Original release
- Network: TVN; TVN 7
- Release: September 1, 2014 – November 27, 2020

High School (Polish: Szkoła) is a Polish pseudo-documentary television series that aired on TVN and TVN 7 from September 1, 2014 to November 27, 2020.

The series is set in two fictional schools in Kraków, both named for Adam Mickiewicz - gymnasium no. 105 and lyceum no. 44. Each episode tells the story of a group of students (rarely of teachers), most commonly one from the gymnasium and one from the lyceum.

At its original conception, the series was entitled Nauczyciele (Eng: Teachers). It followed several other documentary series, including Szpital set in a hospital and Pamiętniki z Wakacji, set in the Canary Islands.

== Cast ==
Most student characters appear only in a few episodes. The cast of teachers, however, is recurring and features the following.

- Tadeusz Piotr Łomnicki as Tadeusz Chlebowski, headteacher
- Maria Meyer as Maria Borkowska, deputy headteacher
- Sabina Głuch as Jolanta Żabińska, Polish teacher
- Joanna Litwin-Widera as Barbara Gruszka, biology teacher
- Dorota Godzic as Teresa Kremer, mathematics teacher
- Jagoda Pietruszkówna as Alicja Stańko, chemistry teacher
- Aleksandra Żurecka as Anna Turczyn, English teacher
- Karol Wolski as Piotr Gądek, IT teacher (ep. 0-125)
- Rafał Kosecki as Andrzej Lesicki, physics teacher
- Jan Mancewicz as Zbigniew Małek, history teacher
- Wolfgang Hofer as Dominik Huber, German teacher
- Patrice Nieckowski as Patrice Nieckowski, French teacher
- Konrad Pondo as Tomasz Dudziak, P.E. teacher
- Małgorzata Merwart as Karina Kłosek, IT teacher (since ep. 223)
