= TG Lurgan =

TG Lurgan is a musical project launched by Coláiste Lurgan, an independent summer school based in Indreabhán, a village in Connemara, a Gaeltacht, where the Irish language is the predominant spoken language. TG Lurgan releases interpretations as covers of many popular tunes with new lyrics in the Irish language.

The purpose of TG Lurgan is to help and support learners in acquiring the Irish language and their YouTube channel is a world leading minority language platform.

== Songs ==
Early interpretations with a great following included "Some Nights" from the American indie pop band fun., "An Chóisir Rac", an Irish version of "Party Rock Anthem" by the American electronic duo LMFAO and "Lady Ga(eilge)", a medley of Lady Gaga songs.

TG Lurgan also released original compositions, such as "Damhsa Amhráin", "Céili ar an Trá", "An Buachaill Ceart", "Can Os Ard", "Seans Deirneach" and "An Bráisléid".

The popularity of the project exploded in 2013 with their interpretation of "Wake Me Up" by the Swedish DJ Avicii. Stiofán Ó Fearail was a teacher in the Coláiste Lurgan programme and was lead vocalist for the hit. The song garnered over 8.2 million views by March 2023 on TG Lurgan's YouTube channel. "Wake Me Up" in Irish earned TG Lurgan a live appearance on the popular RTÉ Irish talk show programme The Late Late Show.

Several of TG Lurgan's interpretations have passed the 1 million views on YouTube: "Amhrán na gCupán", a cover of "Cups" ("When I'm Gone"), "Síoraí Spraoi" (OMI's "Cheerleader"), "Pompeii" from Bastille, "Hello" from Adele, "Some Nights" from fun and "Despacito" from Luis Fonsi.

In 2021, TG Lurgan worked with Wales' Urdd Gobaith Cymru to release a bilingual (Welsh and Irish) version of "Blinding Lights" by The Weeknd, "Golau'n Dallu / Dallta ag na Solise". The project was hailed by First Minister of Wales Mark Drakeford as a "symbol of the cultural ties that bind Ireland and Wales".
