= Fifth year =

Year of schooling in Scotland and Ireland

Fifth Year refers to the fifth year of schooling in secondary schools in Scotland and Ireland. It was also the traditional term for the same year group in England and Wales, until about 1990 when most schools replaced it with Year Eleven and Year Twelve. It is also equivalent to 11th grade.

== Scotland ==
In Scotland this is also known as S5. During this year pupils will generally sit Higher exams, essential for entry to a Scottish university. Other exams that can be taken are National 5's and National 4's. Fifth Year is now an "optional" year which pupils choose to remain at school to be part of unless the student would enter the fifth year at an age less than 16 in which case they are required to stay on until the end of the winter term. Most pupils are 16 or 17 years of age by the end of their Fifth Year.

Fifth Year is commonly known to be the most stressful school year in the Scottish education system due to the great increase in difficulty of the courses being taken as well as the increase the amount of work required to be completed.

== Ireland ==
Fifth year is the first mandatory year of the Leaving Certificate cycle. It is usually preceded by the optional Transition Year. Most pupils are 17 or 18 years of age by the end of their Fifth Year. Many secondary schools have Summer exams at the end of Fifth Year to test the student on what they have learned throughout the year. Fifth year requires students to work more independently and requires more responsibility than in the Junior Certificate cycle. This is the penultimate year in their schooling.

Preceded by Fourth year	Fifth year 15.5–17	Succeeded by Sixth year
