= Third year =

Year of schooling in Scottish secondary schools

Third year (also known as S3 in Scotland) is the third year of schooling in Irish and Scottish secondary schools, and is roughly equivalent to Year 10 in England and Wales and Year 11 in Northern Ireland. Most pupils are 14 or 15 years old at the end of S3. Traditionally it would be the year that pupils start their Standard Grade courses, or their Leaving Certificate in Ireland. As of 2013, it is standard for schools to continue to offer a broad general education course mixed with National 3 - National 5 work. In Scotland, at the end of S3, pupils usually choose subjects in which they will work on in their Fourth year to sit National 3, 4 or 5. Standard Grade courses are no longer taught in Scottish secondary schools. All schools must follow the 'Curriculum for Excellence'.

Third year was also the traditional English term for the secondary school year group covering the ages 13–14, when a pupil was normally in the third year of their secondary education, though in some areas they were actually in their second year at secondary school (having transferred there at 12 instead of 11) and at schools with an entry age of 13 it was the first year of secondary school. However, this year group has largely been known as Year 9 since September 1990.

The term can also refer to the third year of a university course.

Preceded by Second year	Third year 13.5–15	Succeeded by Fourth year
