= Fourth year =

Year of schooling

Fourth year, also known as S4, is the fourth year of schooling in Scottish, Venezuelan, Ecuadorian, Colombian, and other Latin American countries secondary schools, and is roughly equivalent to Year 11 in England and Wales and Year 12 (Sixth Form) in Northern Ireland. In Latin American countries, it is equal to the United States high school's senior year, but the Scottish S4 is equivalent to 10th grade. Most pupils are 15 or 16 years old at the end of S4. It is at the end of this year the pupils complete their National 4/5 examinations for the new Curriculum for Excellence. Pupils may leave education at the end of S4, if they are 16 years old, the age of majority in Scots law.

The term can also refer to the fourth year of a university course.

Preceded by Third year	Fourth year 14.5–16	Succeeded by Fifth year
