= History of education in Scotland =

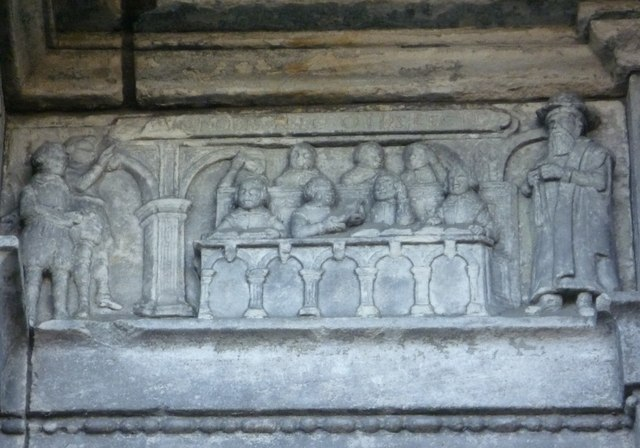
Carving of a 17th-century classroom with a dominie and his ten scholars from George Heriot's School, Edinburgh

The history of education in Scotland in its modern sense of organised and institutional learning, began in the Middle Ages, when Church choir schools and grammar schools began educating boys. By the end of the 15th century schools were also being organised for girls and universities were founded at St Andrews, Glasgow and Aberdeen. Education was encouraged by the Education Act 1496, which made it compulsory for the sons of barons and freeholders of substance to attend the grammar schools, which in turn helped increase literacy among the upper classes.

The Scottish Reformation resulted in major changes to the organisation and nature of education, with the loss of choir schools and the expansion of parish schools, along with the reform and expansion of the Universities. In the seventeenth century, legislation enforced the creation and funding of schools in every parish, often overseen by presbyteries of the local kirk. The existence of this network of schools later led to the growth of the "democratic myth" that poor boys had been able to use this system of education to rise to the top of Scottish society. However, Scotland's University system did help to make it one of the major contributors to the Enlightenment in the 18th century, producing major figures such as David Hume and Adam Smith.

Religious divisions and the impact of industrialisation, migration and immigration disrupted the existing educational system and in the late nineteenth century it was reorganised and expanded to produce a state-funded national system of free basic education and common examinations. The reform of Scottish universities made them major centres of learning and pioneers in the admission of women from 1892. In the 20th century Scottish secondary education expanded, particularly for girls, but the universities began to fall behind those in England and Europe in investment and expansion of numbers. The government of the education system became increasingly centred on Scotland, with the final move of the ministry of education to Edinburgh in 1939. After devolution in 1999 the Scottish Executive also created an Enterprise, Transport and Lifelong Learning Department and there was significant divergence from practice in England, including the abolition of student tuition fees at Scottish universities.

== Middle Ages ==
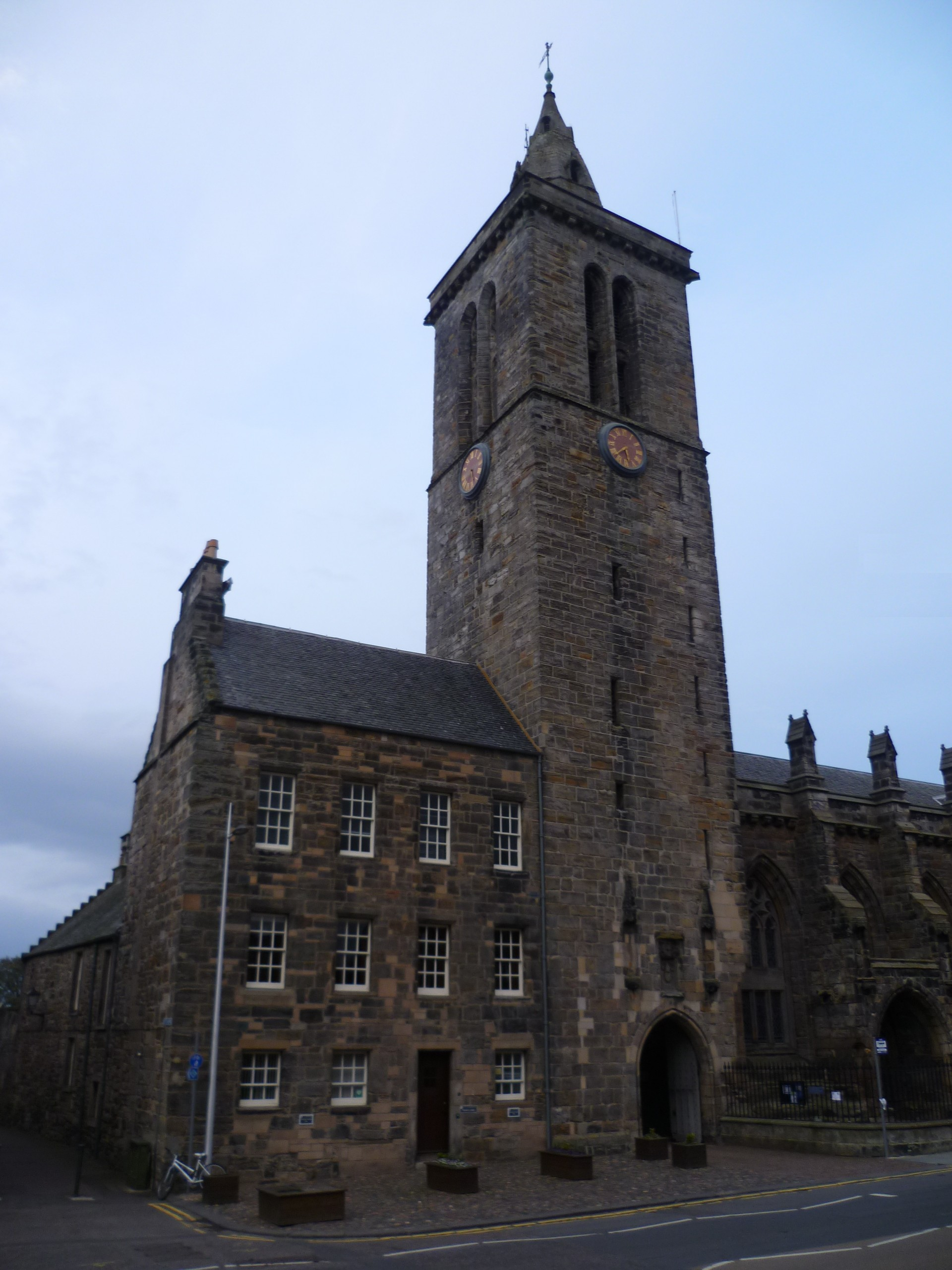
Tower of St Salvator's College, St Andrews, one of the three universities founded in the fifteenth century

In the Early Middle Ages, Scotland was overwhelmingly an oral society and education was verbal rather than literary. Fuller sources for Ireland of the same period suggest that there may have been filidh, who acted as poets, musicians and historians, often attached to the court of a lord or king, and passed on their knowledge in Gaelic to the next generation. After the "de-gallicisation" of the Scottish court from the twelfth century, a less highly regarded order of bards took over these functions and they would continue to act in a similar role in the Highlands and Islands into the eighteenth century. They often trained in bardic schools, of which a few, like the one run by the MacMhuirich dynasty, who were bards to the Lord of the Isles, existed in Scotland and a larger number in Ireland, until they were suppressed from the seventeenth century. Much of their work was never written down and what survives was only recorded from the sixteenth century.

The establishment of Christianity brought Latin to Scotland as a scholarly and written language. Monasteries served as major repositories of knowledge and education, often running schools and providing a small educated elite, who were essential to create and read documents in a largely illiterate society. In the High Middle Ages new sources of education arose, with song and grammar schools. These were usually attached to cathedrals or a collegiate church and were most common in the developing burghs. By the end of the Middle Ages grammar schools could be found in all the main burghs and some small towns. Early examples including the High School of Glasgow in 1124 and the High School of Dundee in 1239. There were also petty schools, more common in rural areas and providing an elementary education. Some monasteries, like the Cistercian abbey at Kinloss, opened their doors to a wider range of students. The number and size of these schools seems to have expanded rapidly from the 1380s. They were almost exclusively aimed at boys, but by the end of the fifteenth century, Edinburgh also had schools for girls, sometimes described as "sewing schools", and probably taught by lay women or nuns. There was also the development of private tuition in the families of lords and wealthy burghers. The growing emphasis on education cumulated with the passing of the Education Act 1496, which decreed that all sons of barons and freeholders of substance should attend grammar schools to learn "perfyct Latyne". All this resulted in an increase in literacy, but which was largely concentrated among a male and wealthy elite, with perhaps 60 per cent of the nobility being literate by the end of the period.

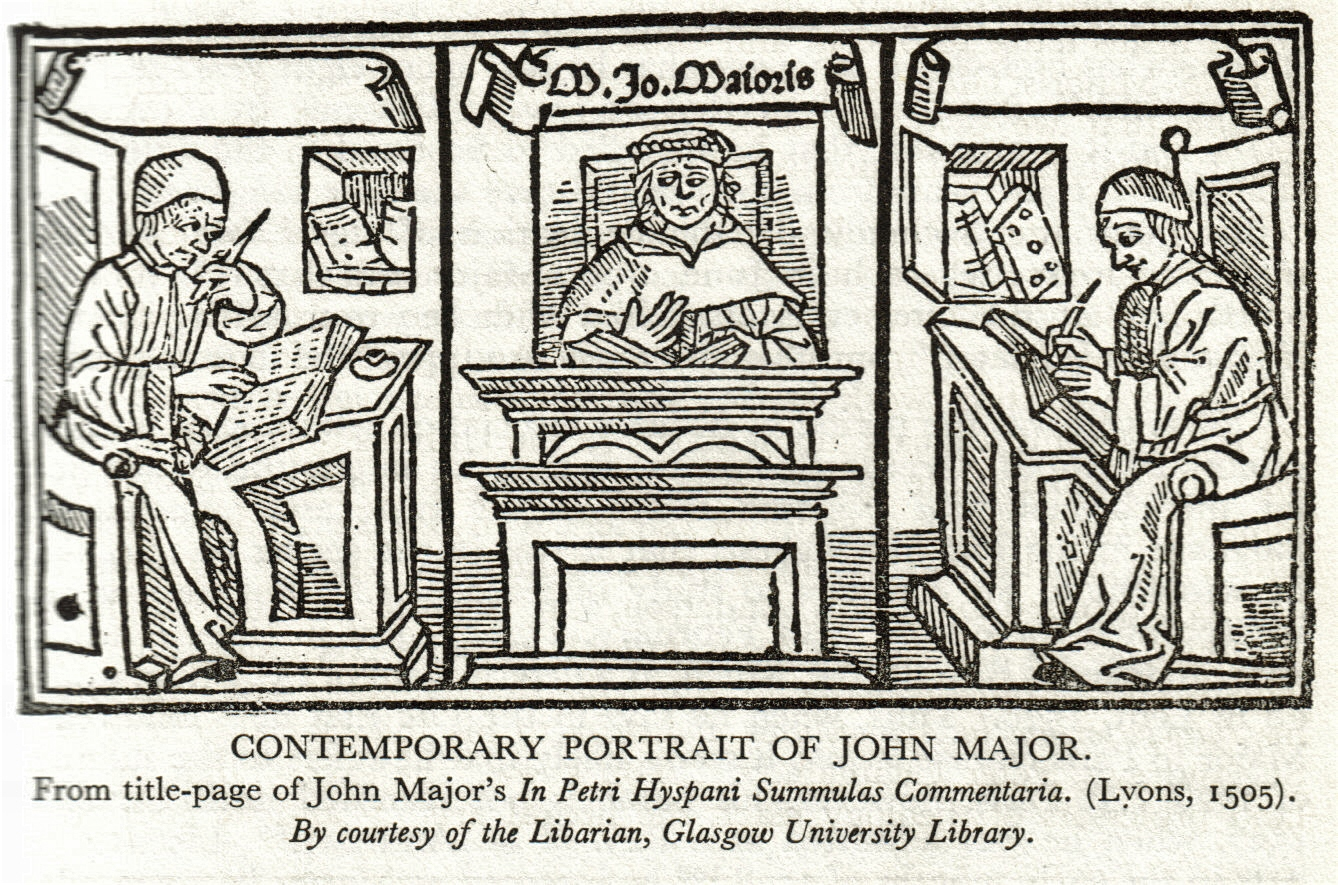
A woodcut showing John Mair, one of the most successful products of the Scottish educational system in the late fifteenth century

Until the fifteenth century, those who wished to attend university had to travel to England or the continent, and just over a 1,000 have been identified as doing so between the twelfth century and 1410. Among these the most important intellectual figure was John Duns Scotus, who studied at Oxford, Cambridge and Paris and probably died at Cologne in 1308, becoming a major influence on late medieval religious thought. After the outbreak of the Wars of Independence, with occasional exceptions under safe conduct, English universities were closed to Scots and continental universities became more significant. Some Scottish scholars became teachers in continental universities. At Paris this included John De Rate and Walter Wardlaw in the 1340s and 1350s, William de Tredbrum in the 1380s and Laurence de Lindores in the early 1500s. This situation was transformed by the founding of the University of St Andrews in 1413, the University of Glasgow in 1451 and the University of Aberdeen in 1495. Initially these institutions were designed for the training of clerics, but they would increasingly be used by laymen who would begin to challenge the clerical monopoly of administrative posts in the government and law. Those wanting to study for second degrees still needed to go elsewhere and Scottish scholars continued to visit the continent and English universities, which reopened to Scots in the late fifteenth century. The continued movement to other universities produced a school of Scottish nominalists at Paris in the early sixteenth century, of which John Mair was probably the most important figure. He had probably studied at a Scottish grammar school, then Cambridge, before moving to Paris, where he matriculated in 1493. By 1497 the humanist and historian Hector Boece, born in Dundee and who had studied at Paris, returned to become the first principal at the new university of Aberdeen. These international contacts helped integrate Scotland into a wider European scholarly world and would be one of the most important ways in which the new ideas of humanism were brought into Scottish intellectual life.

== Impact of the Reformation ==
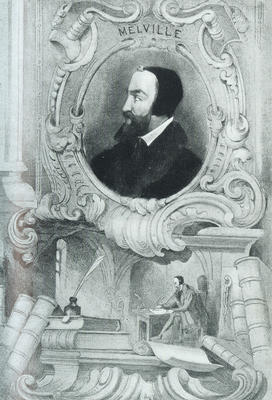
Andrew Melville, credited with major reforms in Scottish Universities in the sixteenth century

The humanist concern with widening education was shared by the Protestant reformers, with a desire for a godly people replacing the aim of having educated citizens. In 1560, the First Book of Discipline set out a plan for a school in every parish, but this proved financially impossible. In the burghs the old schools were maintained, with the song schools and a number of new foundations becoming reformed grammar schools or ordinary parish schools. Schools were supported by a combination of kirk funds, contributions from local heritors or burgh councils and parents that could pay. They were inspected by kirk sessions, who checked for the quality of teaching and doctrinal purity. There were also large number of unregulated "adventure schools", which sometimes fulfilled a local needs and sometimes took pupils away from the official schools. Outside of the established burgh schools, masters often combined their position with other employment, particularly minor posts within the kirk, such as clerk. At their best, the curriculum included catechism, Latin, French, Classical literature and sports.

In 1616 an act in Privy council commanded every parish to establish a school "where convenient means may be had", and when the Parliament of Scotland ratified this with the Education Act 1633, a tax on local landowners was introduced to provide the necessary endowment. A loophole which allowed evasion of this tax was closed in the Education Act 1646, which established a solid institutional foundation for schools on Covenanter principles. Although the Restoration brought a reversion to the 1633 position, in 1696 new legislation restored the provisions of 1646 together with means of enforcement "more suitable to the age". Underlining the aim of having a school in every parish. In rural communities these obliged local landowners (heritors) to provide a schoolhouse and pay a schoolmaster, while ministers and local presbyteries oversaw the quality of the education. In many Scottish towns, burgh schools were operated by local councils. By the late seventeenth century there was a largely complete network of parish schools in the lowlands, but in the Highlands basic education was still lacking in many areas.

The widespread belief in the limited intellectual and moral capacity of women, vied with a desire, intensified after the Reformation, for women to take personal moral responsibility, particularly as wives and mothers. In Protestantism this necessitated an ability to learn and understand the catechism and even to be able to independently read the Bible, but most commentators, even those that tended to encourage the education of girls, thought they should not receive the same academic education as boys. In the lower ranks of society, they benefited from the expansion of the parish schools system that took place after the Reformation, but were usually outnumbered by boys, often taught separately, for a shorter time and to a lower level. They were frequently taught reading, sewing and knitting, but not writing. Female illiteracy rates based on signatures among female servants were around 90 percent, from the late seventeenth to the early eighteenth centuries and perhaps 85 percent for women of all ranks by 1750, compared with 35 per cent for men. Among the nobility there were many educated and cultured women, of which Mary, Queen of Scots is the most obvious example.

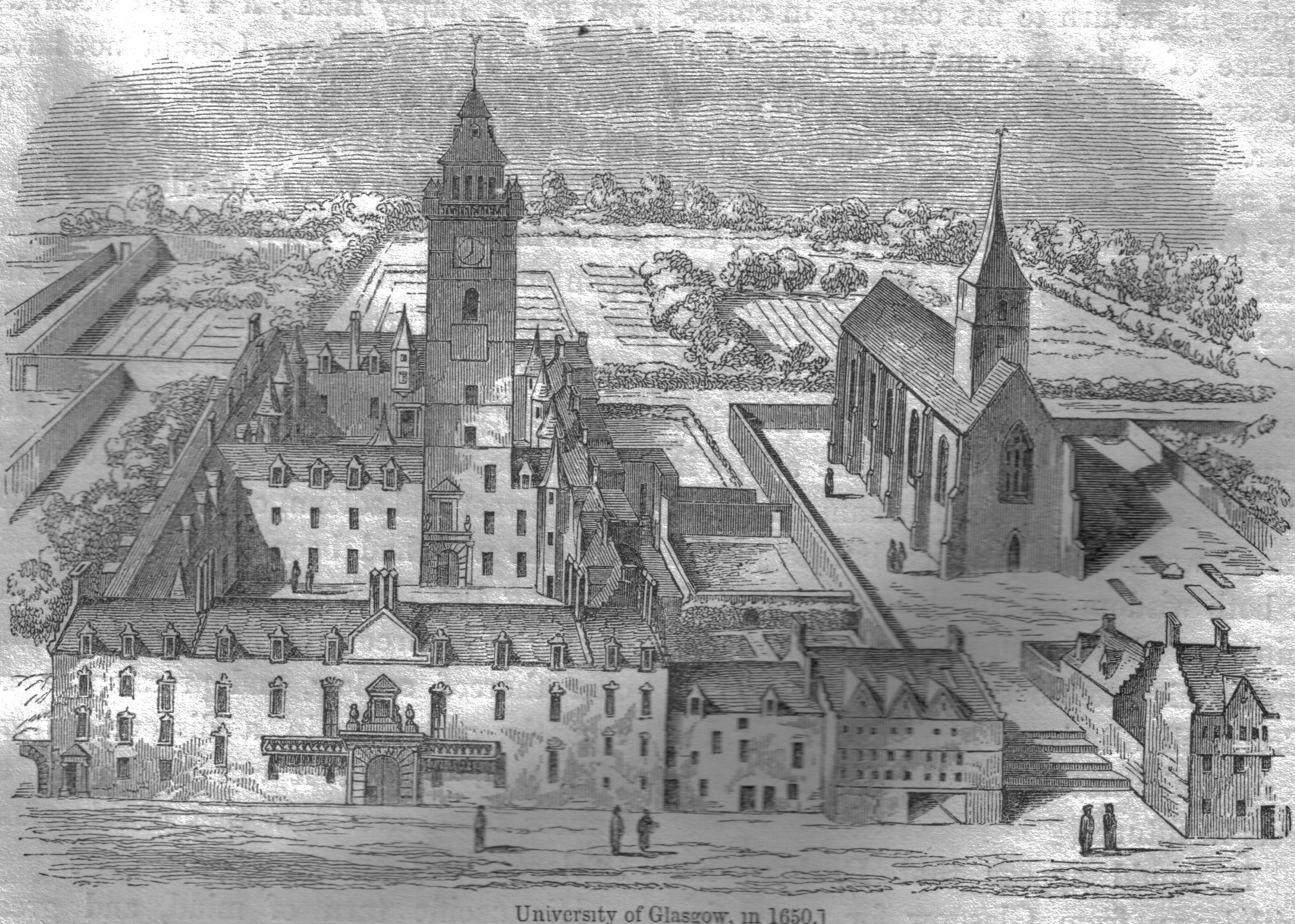
The High Street college of the University of Glasgow, completed under the Commonwealth

After the Reformation, Scotland's universities underwent a series of reforms associated with Andrew Melville, who returned from Geneva to become principal of the University of Glasgow in 1574. A distinguished linguist, philosopher and poet, he had trained in Paris and studied law at Poitiers, before moving to Geneva and developing an interest in Protestant theology. Influenced by the anti-Aristotelian Petrus Ramus, he placed an emphasis on simplified logic and elevated languages and sciences to the same status as philosophy, allowing accepted ideas in all areas to be challenged. He introduced new specialist teaching staff, replacing the system of "regenting", where one tutor took the students through the entire arts curriculum. Metaphysics was abandoned and Greek became compulsory in the first year followed by Aramaic, Syriac and Hebrew, launching a new fashion for ancient and biblical languages. Glasgow had probably been declining as a university before his arrival, but students now began to arrive in large numbers. He assisted in the reconstruction of Marischal College, Aberdeen, and in order to do for St Andrews what he had done for Glasgow, he was appointed Principal of St Mary's College, St Andrews, in 1580. The University of Edinburgh developed out of public lectures were established in the town 1540s on law, Greek, Latin and philosophy, under the patronage of Mary of Guise. These evolved into the "Tounis College", which would become the University of Edinburgh in 1582. The results were a revitalisation of all Scottish universities, which were now producing a quality of education the equal of that offered anywhere in Europe. Under the Commonwealth, the universities saw an improvement in their funding, as they were given income from deaneries, defunct bishoprics and the excise, allowing the completion of buildings including the college in the High Street in Glasgow. They were still largely seen as a training school for clergy, and came under the control of the hard line Protestors, who were generally favoured by the regime because of their greater antipathy to royalism, with Patrick Gillespie being made Principal at Glasgow. After the Restoration there was a purge of the universities, but much of the intellectual advances of the preceding period was preserved. The five Scottish universities recovered with a lecture-based curriculum that was able to embrace economics and science, offering a high quality liberal education to the sons of the nobility and gentry. It helped the universities to become major centres of medical education and would put Scotland at the forefront of Enlightenment thinking.

== Eighteenth century ==
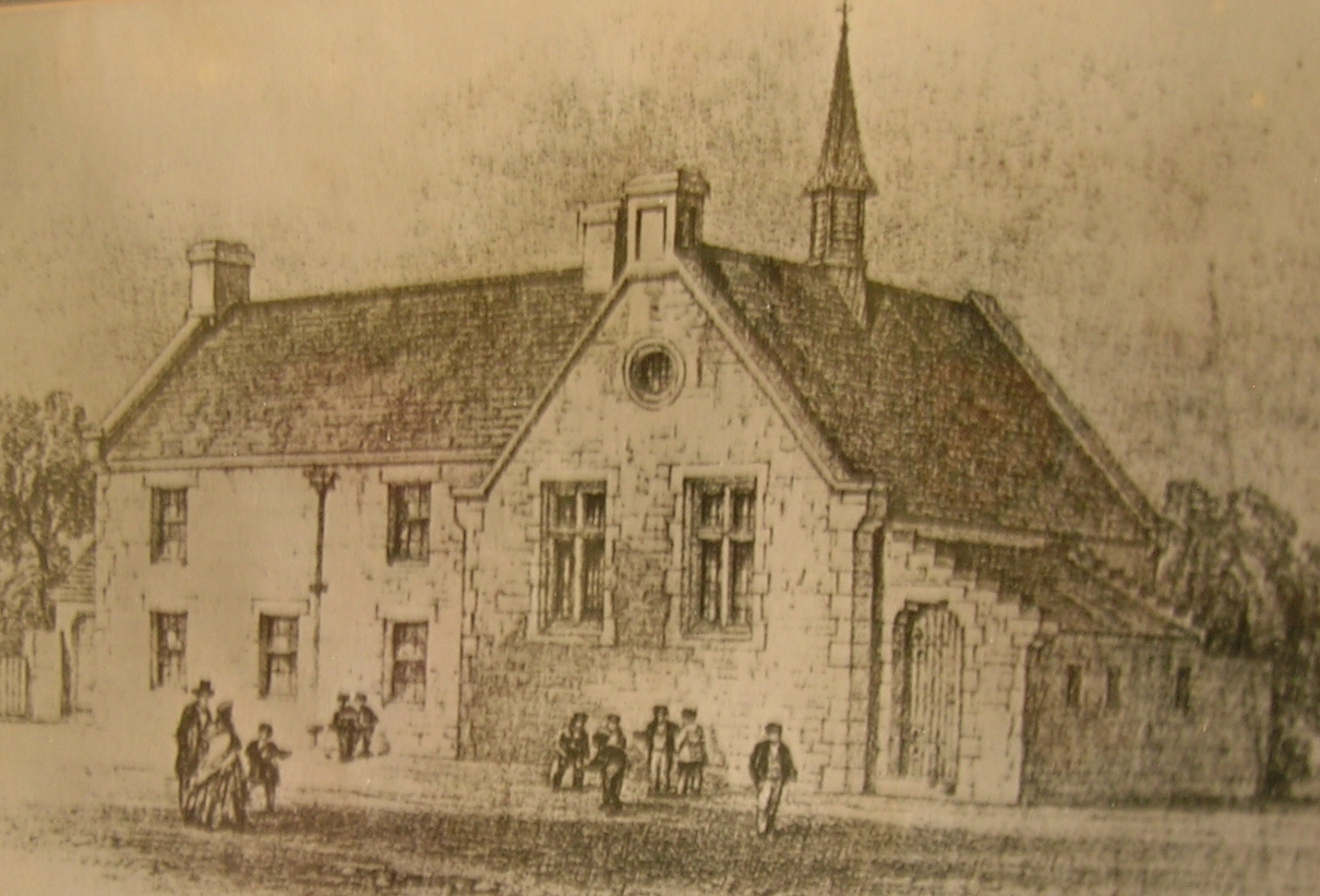
The old school at Kingsford, East Ayrshire

One of the effects of this extensive network of schools was the growth of the "democratic myth" in the 19th century, which created the widespread belief that many a "lad of pairts" had been able to rise up through the system to take high office and that literacy was much more widespread in Scotland than in neighbouring states, particularly England. Historians now accept that very few boys were able to pursue this route to social advancement and that literacy was not noticeably higher than comparable nations, as the education in the parish schools was basic, short and attendance was not compulsory. However, Scotland did reap the intellectual benefits of a highly developed university system. Scottish thinkers began questioning assumptions previously taken for granted; and with Scotland's traditional connections to France, then in the throes of the Enlightenment, the Scots began developing a uniquely practical branch of humanism. Major thinkers produced by this system included Francis Hutcheson, who held the Chair of Philosophy at the University of Glasgow from 1729 to 1746, who helped develop Utilitarianism and consequentialist thinking. Some modern attitudes towards the relationship between science and religion were developed by his proteges David Hume and Adam Smith.

By the eighteenth century many poorer girls were being taught in dame schools, informally set up by a widow or spinster to teach reading, sewing and cooking. Among members of the aristocracy by the early eighteenth century a girl's education was expected to include basic literacy and numeracy, needlework and cookery and household management, while polite accomplishments and piety were also emphasised.

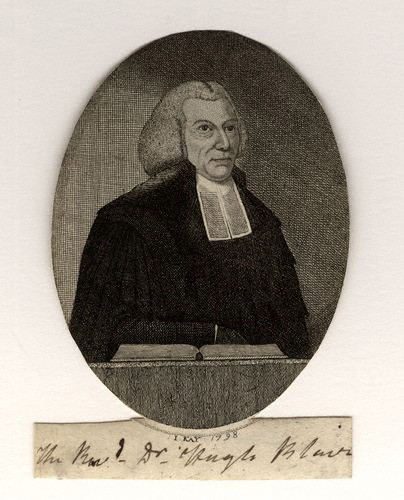
Hugh Blair, Professor of Rhetoric and Belles Lettres at the University of Edinburgh

In the Scottish Highlands as well as problems of distance and physical isolation, most people spoke Gaelic which few teachers and ministers could understand. Here the Kirk's parish schools were supplemented by the Society in Scotland for Propagating Christian Knowledge, established in 1709. Their aim was to teach English language and end Roman Catholicism associated with rebellious Jacobitism. Though the Gaelic Society schools taught the Bible in Gaelic, the overall effect contributed to the erosion of Highland culture.

Throughout the last part of the century schools and universities also benefitted from the robust educational publishing industry that existed across the Lowlands and which printed primers, dabbity sheets, textbooks, lecture heads and other kinds of effective learning tools that helped students remember information.

In the eighteenth century Scotland's universities went from being small and parochial institutions, largely for the training of clergy and lawyers, to major intellectual centres at the forefront of Scottish identity and life, seen as fundamental to democratic principles and the opportunity for social advancement for the talented. Chairs of medicine were founded at Marsichial College (1700), Glasgow (1713), St. Andrews (1722) and a chair of chemistry and medicine at Edinburgh (1713). It was Edinburgh's medical school, founded in 1732 that came to dominate. By the 1740s it had displaced Leiden as the major centre of medicine in Europe and was a leading centre in the Atlantic world. The universities still had their difficulties. The economic downturn in the mid-century forced the closure of St Leonard's College in St Andrews, whose properties and staff were merged into St Salvator's College to form the United College of St Salvator and St Leonard.

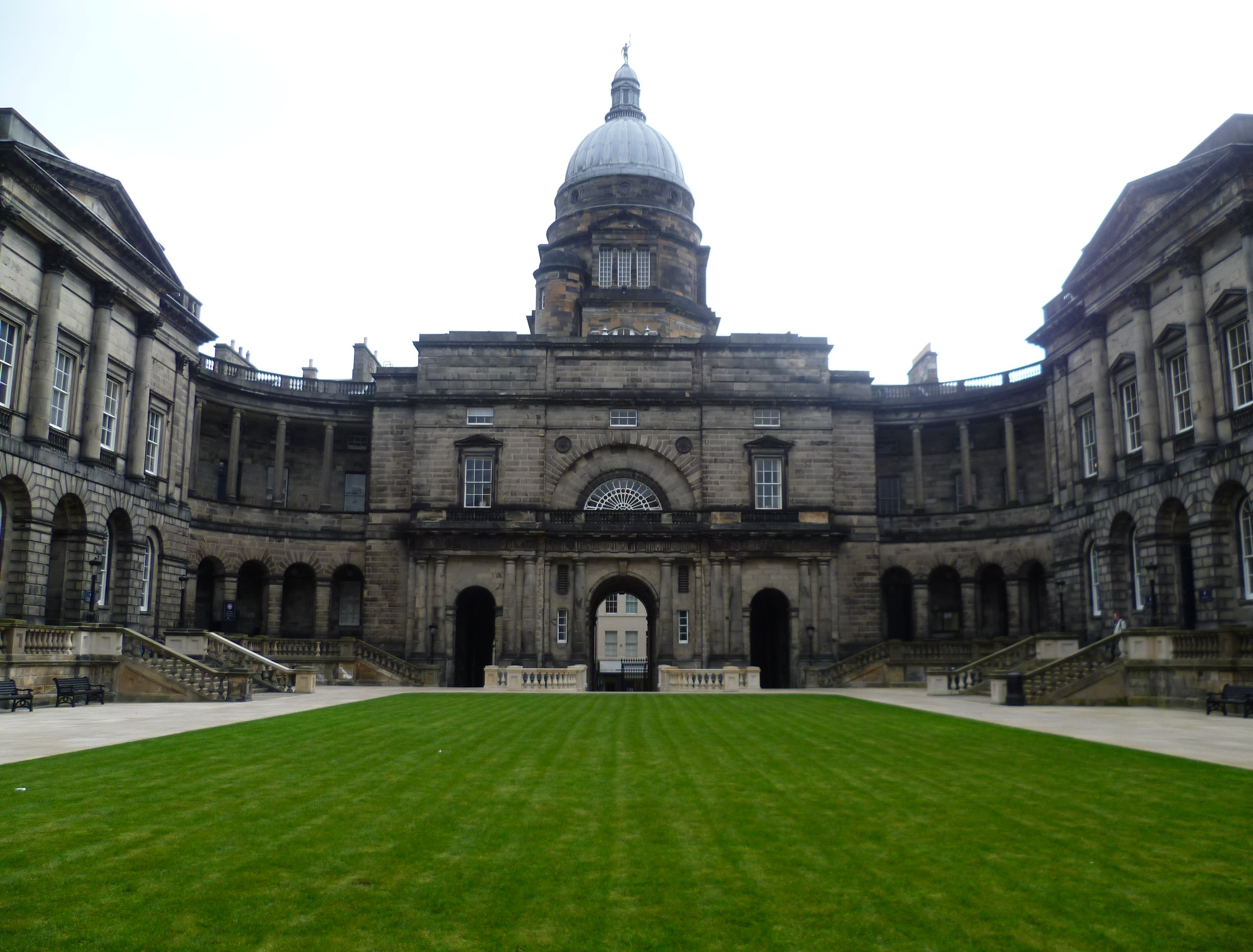
Old College, University of Edinburgh, built to plans drawn up by Robert Adam and completed in the nineteenth century

Access to Scottish universities was probably more open than in contemporary England, Germany or France. Attendance was less expensive and the student body more representative of society as a whole. Humbler students were aided by a system of bursaries established to aid in the training of the clergy. In this period residence became divorced from the colleges and students were able to live much more cheaply and largely unsupervised, at home, with friends or in lodgings in the university towns. The system was flexible and the curriculum became a modern philosophical and scientific one, in keeping with contemporary needs for improvement and progress. Scotland reaped the intellectual benefits of this system in its contribution to the European Enlightenment.

Many of the key figures of the Scottish Enlightenment were university professors, who developed their ideas in university lectures. They included Francis Hutcheson (1694-1746), who held the Chair of Philosophy at the University of Glasgow from 1729 to 1746, whose ideas were developed by his protégés David Hume (1711–76), who became a major figure in the sceptical philosophical and empiricist traditions of philosophy, and Adam Smith (1723–90), whose The Wealth of Nations, (1776) is considered to be the first work of modern economics. Hugh Blair (1718–1800) was a minister of the Church of Scotland and held the Chair of Rhetoric and Belles Lettres at the University of Edinburgh. He produced an edition of the works of Shakespeare and is best known for Sermons (1777-1801), Lectures on Rhetoric and Belles Lettres (1783). The focus of the Scottish Enlightenment ranged from intellectual and economic matters to the specifically scientific as in the work of William Cullen, physician and chemist, James Anderson, an agronomist, Joseph Black, physicist and chemist, and James Hutton, the first modern geologist.

== Nineteenth century ==
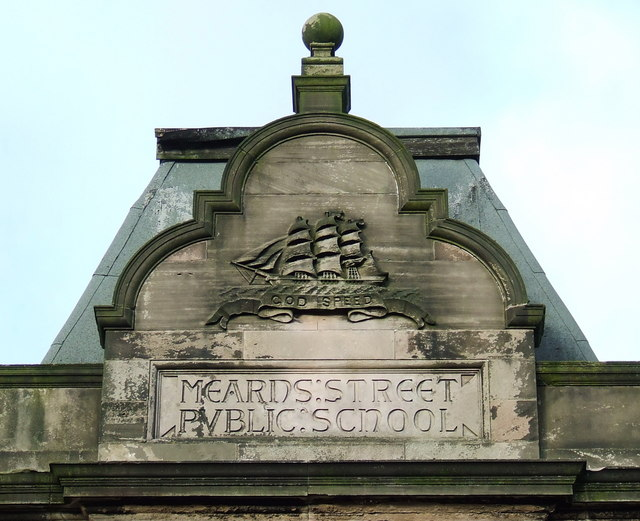
The Mearns Street Public School built for the Greenock Burgh School Board still bears its name, carved on the stone pediment above the entrance.

Industrialisation, urbanisation and the Disruption of 1843 all undermined the tradition of parish schools. 408 teachers in schools joined the breakaway Free Church of Scotland. By May 1847 it was claimed that 513 schoolmasters were being paid direct from a central education fund and over 44,000 children being taught in Free Church Schools. Attempts to supplement the parish system included Sunday Schools. Originally begun in the 1780s by town councils, they were adopted by all religious denominations in the nineteenth century. By the 1830s and 1840s these had widened to include mission schools, ragged schools, Bible societies and improvement classes, open to members of all forms of Protestantism and particularly aimed at the growing urban working classes. By 1890 the Baptists had more Sunday schools than churches and were teaching over 10,000 children. The number would double by 1914. From 1830 the state began to fund buildings with grants, then from 1846 it was funding schools by direct sponsorship, and in 1872 Scotland moved to a system like that in England of state-sponsored largely free schools, run by local school boards. Overall administration was in the hands of the Scotch (later Scottish) Education Department in London. Education was now compulsory from five to thirteen and many new board schools were built. Larger urban school boards established "higher grade" (secondary) schools as a cheaper alternative to the burgh schools. The Scottish Education Department introduced a Leaving Certificate Examination in 1888 to set national standards for secondary education and in 1890 school fees were abolished, creating a state-funded national system of free basic education and common examinations.

At the beginning of the 19th century Scottish universities had no entrance exam, students typically entered at ages of 15 or 16, attended for as little as two years, chose which lectures to attend and left without qualifications. After two commissions of enquiry in 1826 and 1876 and reforming acts of parliament in 1858 and 1889, the curriculum and system of graduation were reformed to meet the needs of the emerging middle classes and the professions. Entrance examinations equivalent to the School Leaving Certificate were introduced and average ages of entry had risen to 17 or 18. Standard patterns of graduation in the arts curriculum offered 3-year ordinary and 4-year honours degrees and separate science faculties were able to move away from the compulsory Latin, Greek and philosophy of the old MA curriculum. The historic University of Glasgow became a leader in British higher education by providing the educational needs of youth from the urban and commercial classes, as well as the upper class. It prepared students for non-commercial careers in government, the law, medicine, education, and the ministry and a smaller group for careers in science and engineering. St Andrews pioneered the admission of women to Scottish universities, creating the Lady Licentiate in Arts (LLA), which proved highly popular. From 1892 Scottish universities could admit and graduate women and the numbers of women at Scottish universities steadily increased until the early 20th century.

== Twentieth century ==
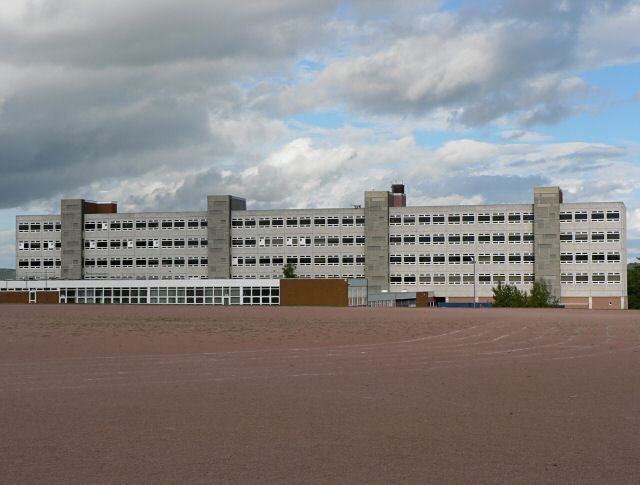
Perth High School, opened in around 1972

The Scottish education system underwent radical change and expansion in the 20th century. In 1918 Roman Catholic schools were brought into the system, but retained their distinct religious character, access to schools by priests and the requirement that school staff be acceptable to the Church. The school leaving age was raised to 14 in 1901, and although plans to raise it to 15 in the 1940s were never ratified, increasing numbers stayed on beyond elementary education and it was eventually raised to 16 in 1973. As a result, secondary education was the major area of growth in the inter-war period, particularly for girls, who stayed on in full-time education in increasing numbers throughout the century. New qualifications were developed to cope with changing aspirations and economics, with the Leaving Certificate being replaced by the Scottish Certificate of Education Ordinary Grade ('O-Grade') and Higher Grade ('Higher') qualifications in 1962, which became the basic entry qualification for university study. The centre of the education system also became more focused on Scotland, with the ministry of education partly moving north in 1918 and then finally having its headquarters relocated to Edinburgh in 1939.

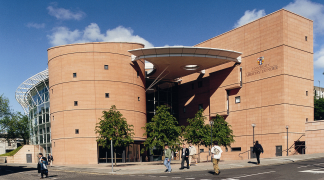
The student library at Abertay University

The first half of the 20th century saw Scottish universities fall behind those in England and Europe in terms of participation and investment. The decline of traditional industries between the wars undermined recruitment. English universities increased the numbers of students registered between 1924 and 1927 by 19 per cent, but in Scotland the numbers fell, particularly among women. In the same period, while expenditure in English universities rose by 90 per cent, in Scotland the increase was less than a third of that figure. In the 1960s the number of Scottish Universities doubled, with Dundee being demerged from St. Andrews, Strathclyde and Heriot-Watt developing from Scottish Office "central institutions" and Stirling beginning as a completely new university on a greenfield site in 1966. Five existing degree awarding institutions became universities after 1992, as a result of the Further and Higher Education Act 1992. These were Abertay, Glasgow Caledonian, Napier, Paisley and Robert Gordon. In 2001 the University of the Highlands and Islands was created by a federation of 13 colleges and research institutions in the Highlands and Islands.

After devolution, in 1999 the new Scottish Executive set up an Education Department and an Enterprise, Transport and Lifelong Learning Department, which together took over its functions. One of the major diversions from practice in England, possible because of devolution, was the abolition of student tuition fees in 1999, instead retaining a system of means-tested student grants.

== The current education system ==
For a description of the current education system in Scotland, see Education in Scotland

== See also ==
- History of schools in Scotland
- Gaelic medium education in Scotland
- List of further and higher education colleges in Scotland
