= Lendrick Muir School =

Scottish residential school

Lendrick Muir School was a Scottish residential school in Perth and Kinross for children of above average intelligence aged 11–19 (originally 7–18), and later children with dyslexia or behavioural problems.

The school said it did not accept pupils who were "sexually promiscuous, psychotic, habitually delinquent or seriously behaviourally disturbed".

Children were expected to be able to follow an academic syllabus, leading to examinations such as Ordinary Grades, Highers or Certificate of Sixth Year Studies, set by the Scottish Examination Board.

The school was housed in Naemoor House, formally Naemoor School, a neo-classical mansion designed by Adam Frame of Alloa which was listed in 1977.

In 1988, the School changed its policy on admissions and its client groups, focussing on children with dyslexia. It retained this focus until its closure in 1998.

== Closure ==
It closed in 1998, following a "damning verdict on the [...] accommodation, management and curriculum". According to the Sunday Mail, among other things, "[The School] which receives more than £250,000 a year in fees has been branded unsafe, dirty and lacking in resources. [...] The inspectors' report revealed a long list of problems. They found dirty and unsafe rooms, bad teaching and a lack of books and computers, and said the dinners were poor."

The head of the school, John McLaughlin, ( who joined the school in its last year) accepted these criticisms and said: "[To stay open] we would have to have put in place a whole range of things. There would be no more communal showering, individual rooms where possible, pleasant views from windows, proper systems of care, quality learning for staff, appropriate ratios."

A TES editorial said: "The “tough” legislation under the Children Act referred to in your report about independent special schools (TESS, February 6) was needed and should be welcomed. The net result of registration with social services is that residential schools will equal or surpass the standard applied to children’s homes. The range of things listed by Mr McLaughlin, head of Lendrick Muir, will be a shock to most local authority care workers as these are mostly issues of the past to them."

== Scottish Child Abuse Inquiry investigation ==
In November 2023, the Scottish Child Abuse Inquiry] (SCAI) announced that as part of its Phase 9 investigations concerning the provision of residential care establishments for children and young people, the Inquiry would examine the provision of residential care by Lendrick Muir School. As Seamab Care and Education are the continuation of the former Lendrick Muir school, Seamab provided evidence and witness to the enquiry.

Hearings began in July 2025. Testimony was heard from former pupils and staff, detailing historic child abuse that occurred at both Lendrick Muir school and Seamab school. The Inquiry's findings will be published, and all relevant evidence will be published online in redacted form.

== See also ==
- Education in Scotland
- Special education in Scotland
