= Education in Scotland in the twentieth century =

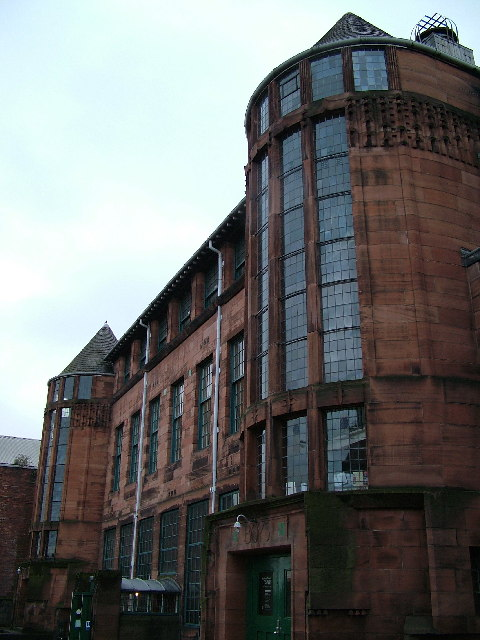
The Scotland Street School, designed by Charles Rennie Mackintosh and built 1903–06

Education in Scotland in the twentieth century includes all forms of organised education in Scotland, such as elementary, secondary and higher education. The centre of the education system became more focused on Scotland throughout the century, with the Scottish Education Department partly moving north from 1918 and new departments created by the Scottish Executive after devolution.

The Education (Scotland) Act 1872 and the abolition of school fees in 1890 meant there was a state-funded, national system of compulsory free basic education with common examinations. The Education (Scotland) Act 1918 introduced the principle of universal free secondary education, brought the Roman Catholic schools into the state system, and replaced the School Boards with 38 specialist local education authorities. These would be subsumed into local government in 1929. Unlike the Education Act 1944 in England and Wales, the Education (Scotland) Act 1945 (8 & 9 Geo. 6. c. 37) was a consolidation measure. Secondary education was the major area of growth, particularly for girls. Selection was ended by the Labour government in 1965. New qualifications were developed to cope with changing aspirations and economics, with the Leaving Certificate being replaced by the Scottish Certificate of Education Ordinary Grade ('O-Grade') and Higher Grade ('Higher'). In the 1980s these were replaced by the Standard Grade qualifications and the curriculum was reformed to take account of the whole range of abilities.

In the first half of the twentieth century Scottish universities fell behind those in England and Europe in terms of participation and investment. After the Robbins Report of 1963 there was a rapid expansion in higher education in Scotland. By the end of the decade the number of Scottish Universities had doubled. New universities included the University of Dundee, Strathclyde, Heriot-Watt, Stirling. From the 1970s the government preferred to expand higher education in the non-university sector and by the late 1980s roughly half of students in higher education were in colleges. Under the Further and Higher Education Act 1992, the distinction between universities and colleges was removed, creating new universities at Abertay, Glasgow Caledonian, Napier, Paisley and Robert Gordon.

== Organisation ==
The centre of the education system became more focused on Scotland throughout the century. The Scotch Education Department (SED) was officially named the Scottish Education Department and partly moved north in 1918. Its headquarters relocated to Edinburgh in 1939. In 1991 it was renamed the Scottish Office Education Department, and then in 1995 it became the Scottish Office Education and Industry Department. After devolution, in 1999 the new Scottish Executive set up a Scottish Education Department and an Enterprise, Transport and Lifelong Learning Department, which together took over its functions.

== Schools ==
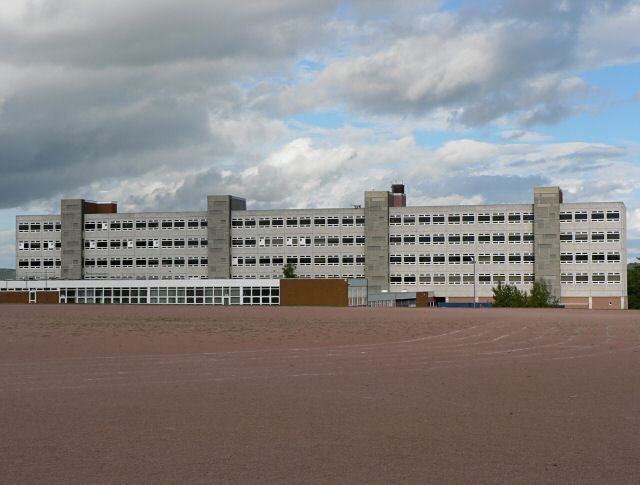
Perth High School, opened in 1950

The Education Act 1872 had established a system of elementary state education up until the age of 12, by taking over the schools of the Presbyterian churches and some charitable schools. The abolition of school fees in 1890 meant there was a state-funded, national system of compulsory, free, basic education with common examinations. From this point attention increasingly turned to secondary education. The Scottish Education Department introduced vocational supplementary teaching in the elementary schools, later known as advanced divisions, up until the age of 14, when pupils would leave to find work. This was controversial because it seemed to be counter the cherished principle that schooling was a potential route to university for the bright "lad o' parts". Larger urban school boards established about 200 "higher grade" (secondary) schools as a cheaper alternative to the burgh schools, most in relatively poor inner city areas. There were also about 60 secondaries established by 1900. The school leaving age was raised to 14 in 1901.

The Education (Scotland) Act 1918 introduced the principle of universal free secondary education, although due to financial crisis and resistance from the SED it took almost two decades to implement. Most of the advanced divisions of the primary schools became junior secondaries, where students received a vocationally orientated education until the age of 14. The old academies and Higher Grade schools became senior secondaries, giving a more academic education, presenting students for the leaving certificate. Selection between the two types of school was determined at age 12 by an intelligence test, the "qualifying examination", known colloquially as "the qualy". The 1918 Act brought the Roman Catholic schools into the state system, but retained their distinct religious character, access to schools by priests and the requirement that school staff be acceptable to the Church. The Act also replaced the School Boards with 38 specialist local education authorities, which were elected by a form of proportional representation in order to protect the rights of the Catholic minority. These would be subsumed into local government in 1929.

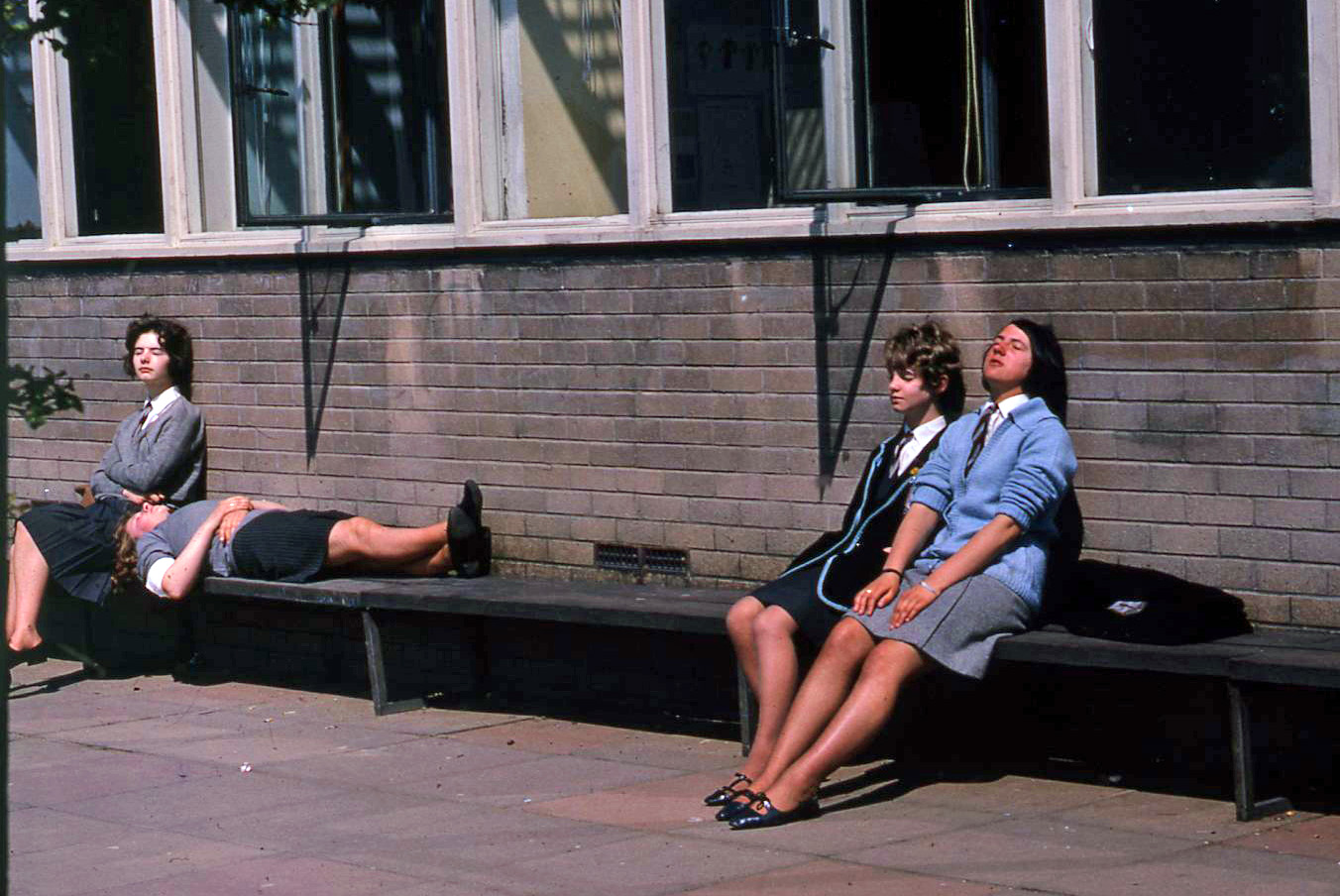
Girls at Cranhill Secondary School, Glasgow, 1967. The increased opportunities for girls in secondary education was a major feature of the twentieth century

Unlike the Education Act 1944 in England and Wales, the Education (Scotland) Act 1945 (8 & 9 Geo. 6. c. 37) was largely a consolidation measure, because universal secondary education had already been in place for over a decade. Plans to raise the school leaving age to 15 in the 1940s were never ratified, but increasing numbers stayed on beyond elementary education and it was eventually raised to 16 in 1973. As a result, secondary education was the major area of growth, particularly for girls, who stayed on in full-time education in increasing numbers throughout the century. The 1947 Report on Secondary Education by the Education Advisory Council, established by Labour minister Tom Johnston, proposed an end to selection and, although rejected by Labour and Conservative governments, became a benchmark for reform. Selection was ended by the Labour government in 1965, which recommended that councils produced one kind of comprehensive secondary school that took all the children in a given neighbourhood. By the late 1970s 75 per cent of children were in non-selective schools and by the early 1980s only the five per cent of children in private schools were subject to selection.

Greater availability of academic qualifications encouraged students to stay on at school. In 1967 22 per cent of students stayed on beyond age 15, but by 1994 the number staying on beyond 16 was 74 per cent. The reorganisation of local government in 1975, which transferred education to nine mainland and three smaller island authorities, allowed those containing large urban centres, to redistribute resources to poorer areas, making education part of a programme of wider social reform. In the 1980s the curriculum was reformed to take account of the whole range of abilities. In 1955 only 22 per cent of pupils achieved five or more passes in ordinary grade. By 1995 the proportion achieving the equivalent in the standard grade was 55 per cent. Gender differences disappeared as girls' attainment caught up with boys in the early 1980s.

The two levels of examinations were originally called Highers and Lowers, but although the name Highers had been retained, Lowers had been renamed Ordinary Grade around 1960 and then again Standard Grade from the second half of the 1980s. Although these arrangements for assessment in secondary schools had been changed and developed over the years, they nevertheless remained close to those of the Scottish Leaving Certificate established in 1888 largely following recommendations by Professor George Chrystal. Hence in 1990 a committee was set up under Professor John Howie to review upper secondary education.

It undertook a thorough investigation of the problems, and its report was published in 1992 with strong criticisms of the current system – for example, that student attainment fell far short of matching the curricular breadth that those involved were so proud of; that the Higher courses were unrealistically demanding; that vocational education was weak; that there was too much flexibility, leading to arbitrary choices and ill-integrated achievement.

It proposed replacing the existing system with two comprehensive certificate courses, one focused chiefly on the academic and the other on the vocational. Although the committee's criticisms of the existing system were largely accepted, there was resistance to its proposals, and in 1994 a more cautious way ahead was found entitled Higher Still.

== Universities ==
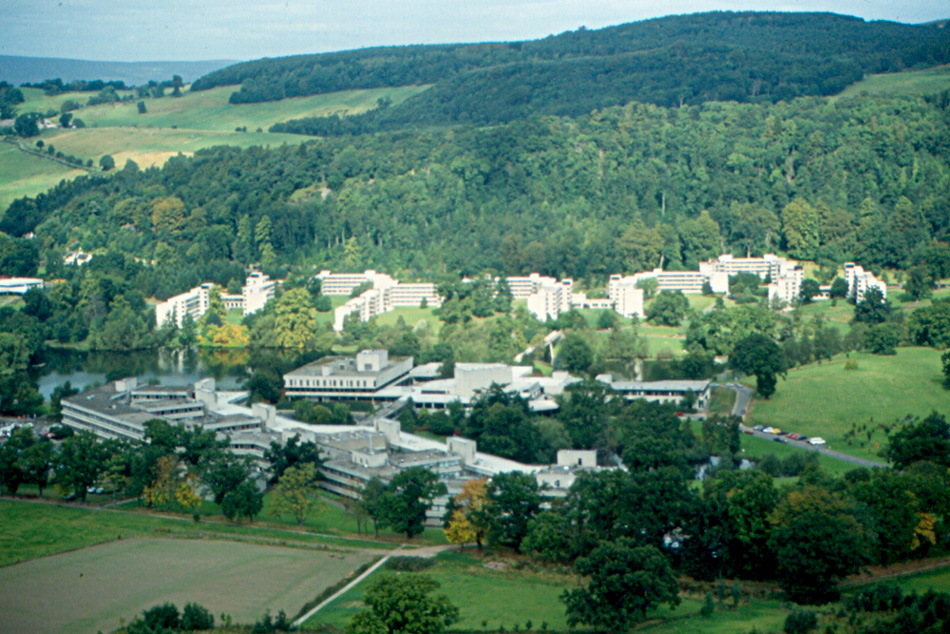
The purpose-built modern buildings of the University of Stirling

At the beginning of the century Scotland's four Ancient universities had 6,254 students. From 1901 large numbers of students received bursaries from the Carnegie Trust. By 1913 there were 7,776 students in Scottish universities. Of these 1,751 (23 per cent) were women. By the mid-1920s it had risen to a third. It then fell to 25–7 per cent in the 1930s as opportunities in school teaching, virtually the only careers outlet for female graduates in arts and sciences, decreased. No woman was appointed to a Scottish professorship until after 1945. The fall in numbers was most acute among women students, but it was part of a general trend. In the first half of the twentieth century Scottish universities fell behind those in England and Europe in terms of participation and investment. The decline of traditional industries between the wars undermined recruitment to subjects in which Scotland had been traditionally strong, such as science and engineering. English universities increased the numbers of students registered between 1924 and 1927 by 19 per cent, but in Scotland the number of full-time students fell from 10,400 in 1924 to 9,900 in 1937. In the same period, while expenditure in English universities rose by 90 per cent, in Scotland the increase was less than a third of that figure.

Before the First World War relationships between male and female students tended to be very formal, but in the inter-war years there was an increase in social activities, such as dance halls, cinemas, cafes and public houses. From the 1920s much drunken and high spirited activity was diverted into the annual charity gala or rag. Male centred activities included the Students' Union, Rugby Club and Officers' Training Corps. Women had their own unions and athletics clubs. Universities remained largely non-residential, although a few women's halls of residence were created, most not owned by the universities.

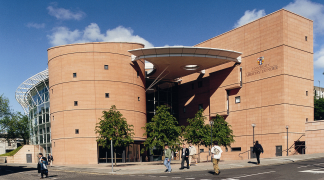
The student library at Abertay University

After the Robbins Report of 1963 there was a rapid expansion of higher education in Scotland. By the end of the decade the number of Scottish Universities had doubled. Strathclyde and Heriot-Watt were developed from technical colleges in 1964 and 1966, respectively, Stirling was begun as a completely new university on a greenfield site in 1966, and the University of Dundee was demerged from St. Andrews to become a separate institution in 1967. From the 1970s the government preferred to expand higher education in the non-university sector of educational and technical colleges, which were cheaper because they undertook little research. By the late 1980s roughly half of students in higher education were in colleges. In 1992, under the Further and Higher Education Act 1992, the distinction between universities and colleges was removed. This created new universities at Abertay, Glasgow Caledonian, Napier, Paisley and Robert Gordon. Despite the expansion the number of male students experienced a downturn in growth from 1971 to 1990. The growth in female student numbers was much larger and continued until by 1999 and 2000 the numbers of women students exceeded male students for the first time. After devolution, one of the major diversions from practice in England was the abolition of student tuition fees in 1999, instead Scotland retained a system of means-tested student grants.
