= First MacDonald shadow cabinet =

First MacDonald Shadow Cabinet
- Shadow Cabinet of the United Kingdom
- February 1923–22 January 1924
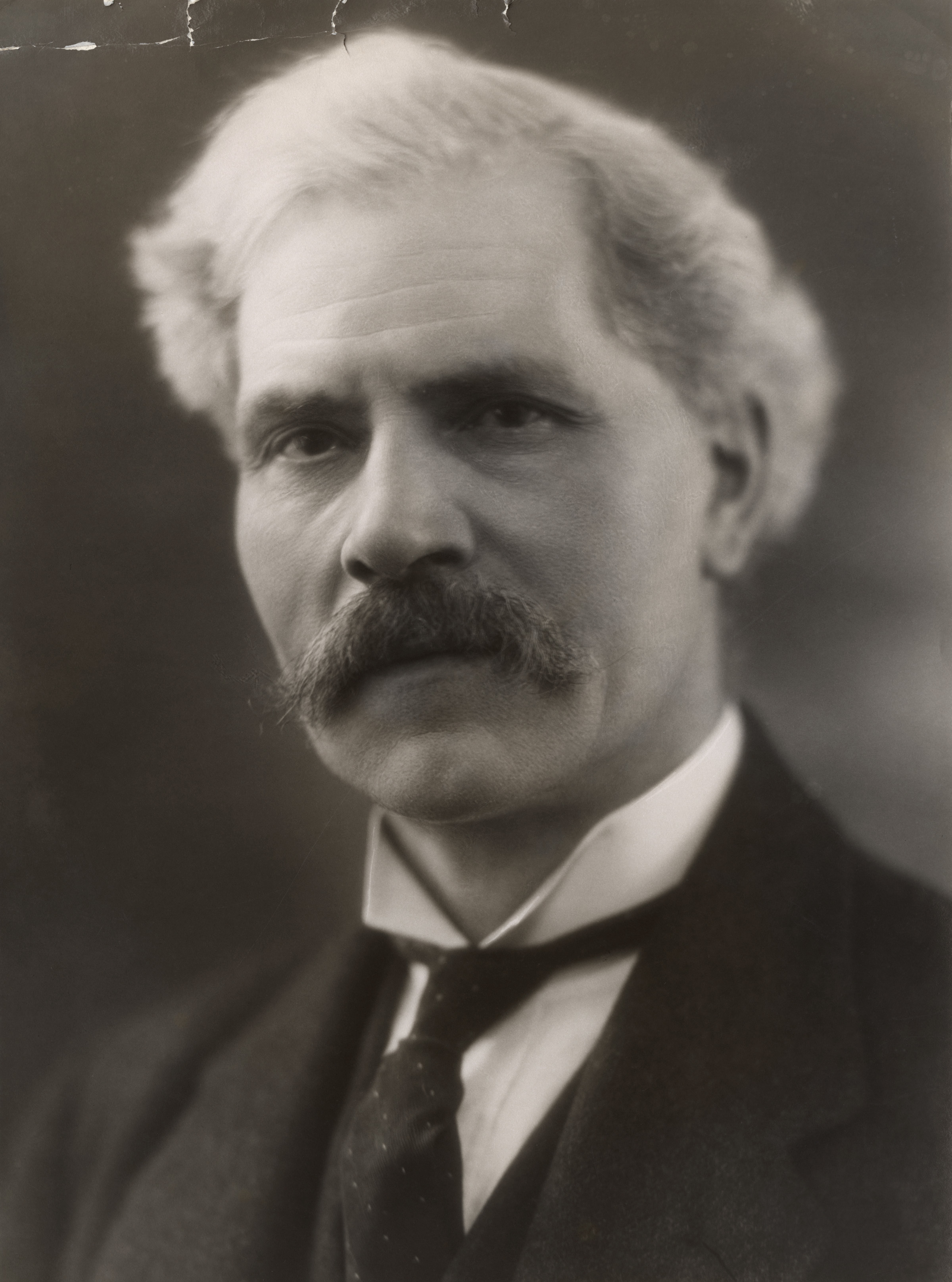
- MacDonald in February 1923
- Date established: February 1923
- Date dissolved: 22 January 1924

Leadership and composition
- Monarch: George V
- Leader of the Opposition: Ramsay MacDonald
- Deputy Leader of the Opposition: J. R. Clynes
- Member party: Labour Party
- Status in legislature: Official Opposition 142 / 615 (23%)

Formation and history
- Legislature terms: 1922 UK Parliament
- Predecessor: Shadow Cabinet of David Lloyd George
- Successor: First Shadow Cabinet of Stanley Baldwin

Ramsay MacDonald became Leader of the Opposition after he was elected as Leader of the Labour Party on 22 November 1922 in the aftermath of the 1922 general election, which saw Labour become the Official Opposition for the first time in its history. As Labour adapted to the function of Official Opposition, the Parliamentary Labour Party (PLP) agreed to elect a new shadow cabinet – the first formed by the Labour Party – with 12 members democratically elected by Labour MPs and three members, including the leader, deputy leader and chief whip, serving in ex officio roles.

MacDonald's shadow cabinet was mainly dominated by five senior figures in the Labour Party, including himself, his deputy J. R. Clynes, Arthur Henderson, J. H. Thomas and Phillip Snowden, collectively known as the Big Five. The Big Five decided Labour's policy and strategy in opposition, and later decided the composition of the first MacDonald ministry when Labour first gained power after the 1923 general election; most members of MacDonald's shadow cabinet went on to serve in this ministry, which was the first Labour government in British history.

== Background ==
The Labour Party was founded in 1900. Before 1922, the British political system was traditionally dominated by the rival Liberal and Conservative parties, which regularly traded power as the Government of the United Kingdom or Official Opposition. From the 1880s, a new parliamentary convention started to take hold where the Official Opposition would form a shadow cabinet, typically consisting of former ministers from the last time that party was in government, who led the party in opposition, shadowed the serving government, and acted as a government-in-waiting for when the party won an election and returned to power.

In the 1922 general election, Labour rose to the position of Official Opposition for the first time in its history, after it won more seats than the Liberal Party and superseded it as the main force rivalling the Conservatives, who were in government at the time. In the aftermath of the election, on 22 November 1922, the Parliamentary Labour Party (PLP) elected former leader Ramsay MacDonald as its new leader and therefore as Leader of the Opposition. After MacDonald's election, it was agreed by the PLP that Labour should form a new shadow cabinet as it adapted to filling the role of the Official Opposition. The Labour Party was still a relatively new political force with little experience of leadership or government, except for some minor posts in the wartime coalition of David Lloyd George, so a traditional shadow cabinet of former ministers could not be appointed. Instead, the shadow cabinet would mainly be elected, with 12 members democratically elected by Labour MPs while three members, the leader, deputy leader and chief whip, would serve in the shadow cabinet as ex officio members. Members of the shadow cabinet could only be MPs in the House of Commons, with Labour peers in the House of Lords barred from the shadow cabinet and PLP until 1925.

== History ==
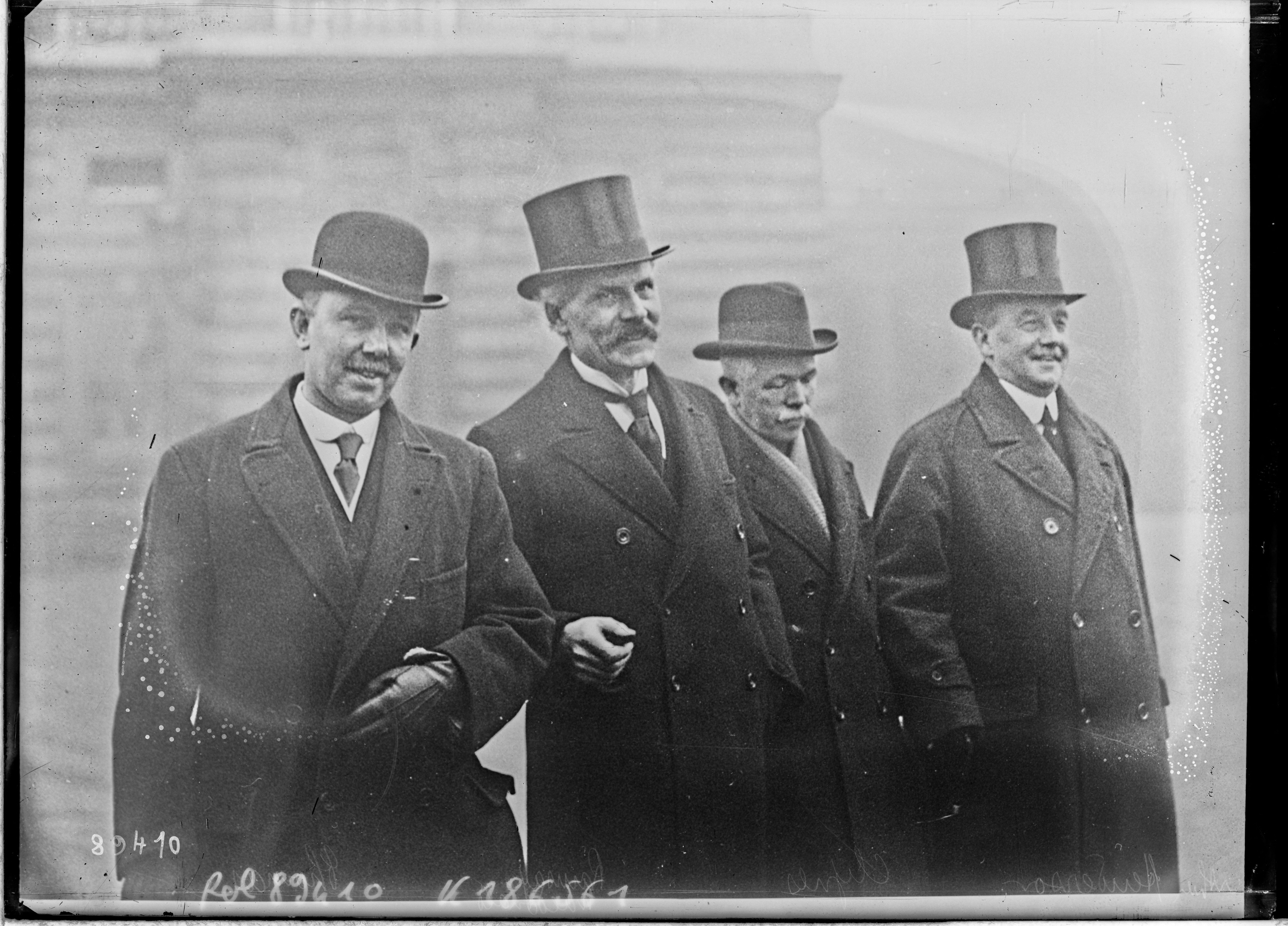
Four of MacDonald's "Big Five" in January 1924. From left to right: J. H. Thomas, MacDonald, J. R. Clynes and Arthur Henderson.

The new shadow cabinet formally took office after the shadow cabinet elections were held in February 1923. Unlike later Labour shadow cabinets, which mirrored the roles in the cabinet as an explicit government-in-waiting, elected members of MacDonald's shadow cabinet were not given specific portfolios, with the policy area for each member agreed weekly, a tradition which continued until Clement Attlee introduced portfolios in 1955. Lines of communication between the shadow cabinet and government departments could not be established because of the short parliamentary term between the 1922 election and the 1923 election. Instead, MacDonald's shadow cabinet was mainly dominated by five senior figures in the Labour Party who decided policy and strategy, including MacDonald, his deputy leader J. R. Clynes, Arthur Henderson, J. H. Thomas and Phillip Snowden, who were collectively known as the Big Five.

The 12 elected members of MacDonald's shadow cabinet included Snowden and Thomas, as well as William Adamson, Rhys Davies, Tom Johnston, Fred Jowett, George Lansbury, E. D. Morel, Tom Shaw, Manny Shinwell, Sidney Webb and John Wheatley. The three ex officio members included MacDonald as leader, Clynes as his deputy leader and Henderson as Labour's chief whip. While there were no explicit portfolios for the other members of the shadow cabinet, some members did specialise on specific policy matters, with Wheatley focusing on housing, Johnston focusing on colonial affairs, Shinwell focusing on coal mining and Snowden focusing on financial and economic policy. MacDonald, Clynes, Jowett and Henderson spoke on a wide range of issues, while Adamson worked on the Education (Scotland) Bill and Shaw worked on the Workmen's Compensation (No. 2) Bill.

As this was the first time that a party other than the Liberal or Conservative parties formed the Official Opposition, and very few of the new Labour shadow cabinet members were members of the Privy Council, there was significant constitutional debate over who was entitled to sit on the opposition frontbench, a right typically enjoyed by the shadow cabinet. After much deliberation, the Speaker of the House, John Henry Whitley, ruled that Labour would receive preference over the established Liberal Party (which was now the second-largest opposition party behind Labour) in debates and opposition days, but that the Liberals would keep the right to fill most of the seats on the frontbench as a concession, with the remaining seats entitled to Labour. Although most senior Liberals did not take advantage of this concession, leaving most of the frontbench open to Labour, the PLP decided against giving shadow cabinet members the right to sit on the frontbench for the party, and instead vested the right to decide who could do so to MacDonald alone. This meant that some members of the shadow cabinet, namely Snowden and Webb, did not sit on the frontbench until later into the parliamentary term, when MacDonald called them to sit there. Meanwhile, other members such as Lansbury chose to stay on the backbenches out of personal preference.

After the 1923 general election, MacDonald was invited by George V to form a Labour minority government supported by the Liberal Party, after the incumbent Conservative Party failed to win enough seats for a majority and could not secure enough votes to pass its King's Speech. MacDonald became Prime Minister and formed the first MacDonald ministry, the first Labour government in British history. Most members of his shadow cabinet went on to serve in this ministry, with the Big Five deciding its composition. MacDonald's cabinet, which had 20 members, would have a 50% split between members of the shadow cabinet and new appointees. Adamson, Jowett, Snowden, Thomas, Shaw, Webb and Wheatley were appointed to the cabinet, while Davies and Shinwell joined the ministry as junior ministers. Johnston and Lansbury were denied a role in the government; Johnston was deemed to have performed poorly when debating the Conservative government on a controversy related to cotton growing in the Anglo-Egyptian Sudan, while Lansbury, a leading figure on the Labour left, was denied a role after he made controversial remarks on the monarchy, suggesting that George V would "lose his head" in a revolution if he interfered in British democratic politics.

The first shadow cabinet of Ramsay MacDonald was the first Labour shadow cabinet and also started the tradition of Labour shadow cabinet elections, where most members of the shadow cabinet were elected from and by MPs in the PLP. This remained in place until 2011, when party leader Ed Miliband reformed shadow cabinet appointments in favour of a system where the leader appoints members without an election. The next Labour shadow cabinet was elected and formed under MacDonald in December 1924, following the fall of the Labour government and the party's return to opposition with its defeat in the 1924 general election.

== Members ==
Position	Member	Constituency	Term
Ex officio members
Leader of the Opposition; Leader of the Labour Party	Ramsay MacDonald	Aberavon	November 1922 – January 1924
Deputy Leader of the Opposition; Deputy Leader of the Labour Party	J. R. Clynes	Manchester Platting	November 1922 – January 1924
Chief Whip of the Labour Party	Arthur Henderson	Newcastle upon Tyne East	November 1922 – January 1924
Elected members
Elected Member	Philip Snowden	Colne Valley	February 1923 – January 1924
Elected Member	George Lansbury	Bow and Bromley	February 1923 – January 1924
Elected Member	J. H. Thomas	Derby	February 1923 – January 1924
Elected Member	William Adamson	West Fife	February 1923 – January 1924
Elected Member	Rhys Davies	Westhoughton	February 1923 – January 1924
Elected Member	Sidney Webb	Seaham	February 1923 – January 1924
Elected Member	Tom Johnston	West Stirlingshire	February 1923 – January 1924
Elected Member	John Wheatley	Glasgow Shettleston	February 1923 – January 1924
Elected Member	Manny Shinwell	Easington	February 1923 – January 1924
Elected Member	Tom Shaw	Preston	February 1923 – January 1924
Elected Member	E. D. Morel	Dundee	February 1923 – January 1924
Elected Member	Fred Jowett	Bradford East	February 1923 – January 1924

== See also ==
- Conservative government, 1922–1924
