= FREDS =

FREDS or Freds may refer to:

- Forum for Renewable Energy Development in Scotland
- Freds (paramilitary), a unit of turned insurgents supporting the British military during The Troubles
