= Scottish Leaving Certificate =

Former educational qualification in Scotland

The Scottish Leaving Certificate was established in 1888 by Henry Craik, permanent secretary of the Scottish Education Department. It was replaced, in 1962, by the Scottish Certificate of Education as an educational qualification. One primary distinction between the Scottish Leaving Certificate and the Scottish Certificate of Education was that the latter had less strict regulations in terms of compulsory subjects and workload of the individual curricula.

== See also ==
- History of education in Scotland
