= Education Directorates =

Group of the civil service directorates in the Scottish Government

The Scottish Government Education Directorates were a group of the civil service directorates in the Scottish Government. The Directorates were titled Children, Young People and Social Care; Schools; and Lifelong Learning. They were responsible for education in Scotland; social work care for children and young people and lifelong learning. In December 2010 these functions were taken on by the Learning and Justice Directorates.

The Directorates reported to the Director-General Leslie Evans. The Cabinet Secretary for Education and Lifelong Learning is Mike Russell. and he was then supported by the Minister for Children and Early Years, Adam Ingram MSP and by the Minister for Skills and Lifelong Learning, Angela Constance MSP at that time.

== History ==
The Scottish Education Department (SED) came into being as the body responsible for schooling in Scotland when it was formed from the Church of Scotland's Board of Education for Scotland in 1872.

The Education (Scotland) Act 1872 continued to make education compulsory in Scotland and took over the running of schools from the Church of Scotland. Burgh as well as parish schools now came under School Boards run by local committees. It was originally called the Scotch Education Department (see Scotch), was a committee of Her Majesty's Most Honourable Privy Council, and had its offices in London. In 1885 the department became a responsibility of the new ministerial post of Secretary for Scotland, under whom the Scottish Office was set up in Dover House, Whitehall, London.

In 1918 the department was moved to Edinburgh and the name was changed to the Scottish Education Department, in accordance with Scottish usage. The Secretary for Scotland became the Secretary of State for Scotland in 1926. The department was renamed the Scottish Office Education Department (SOED) in 1991, and the Scottish Office Education and Industry Department (SOEID) in 1995.

With devolution in 1999, the new Scottish Executive set up the Scottish Executive Education Department (SEED) to oversee school education, whilst the Scottish Executive Enterprise and Lifelong Learning Department – now Enterprise, Transport and Lifelong Learning Department (ETLLD) – took over responsibility from the former SED for further and higher education, and also maintenance grants for Scottish university students, through the Student Awards Agency for Scotland, an Executive Agency of ETLLD. In May 2007, the new Scottish National Party government abolished the departments within the Scottish Executive. The Scottish Government is now structured around individual Directorates, grouped for some purposes under a Director-General.

=== Sponsorship of Agencies and Public Bodies ===
The Directorates sponsor the following executive agencies:

- Her Majesty's Inspectorate of Education
- Social Work Inspection Agency
- Student Awards Agency for Scotland

They also provide funding for the following public bodies:

- General Teaching Council for Scotland
- Learning and Teaching Scotland
- National Grid for Learning Scotland
- Scottish Children's Reporter Administration
- Scottish Qualifications Authority

== See also ==
- Education in Scotland
- School board (Scotland)
- Scottish Credit and Qualifications Framework
- Scottish Qualifications Authority
