= Advanced Higher =

Optional qualification of the Scottish secondary education system

The Advanced Higher (Scottish Gaelic: Sàr Àrd Ìre) is an optional qualification which forms part of the Scottish secondary education system brought in to replace the Certificate of Sixth Year Studies (CSYS). The first certification of Advanced Higher was in 2001. It is normally taken by students aged around 16–18 years of age after they have completed Highers, which are the main university entrance qualification in Scotland.

An Advanced Higher is the highest certificate offered by the Scottish Qualifications Authority as part of the Scottish Credit and Qualifications Framework. An Advanced Higher qualification is essentially a simulation of the first year of university in that particular subject; this is the reason that Advanced Highers can be used for second-year university entry.

Universities in Scotland traditionally tended to take students with only NQ Higher or A-level qualifications, but many have since begun to take students with qualifications gained elsewhere in the UK or, as with the University of Glasgow, for example; an International Baccalaureate and American qualifications such as a High School Diploma in combination of SAT/ACT scores and SAT Subject Tests or Advanced Placement exams.

The Advanced Higher is Level 7 on the Scottish Credit and Qualifications Framework.

== History ==
Advanced Highers were introduced to replace the Sixth Year Studies Certificate (often abbreviated to CSYS or just SYS). The final CSYS exams were taken by students at the end of the Sixth Form studies.

== UCAS tariff ==
The UCAS tariff of valuing qualifications for university entry has increased its scores for Advanced Highers at A, B and C in comparison to the past. Advanced Highers now attract more UCAS tariff points than A-Levels at the same grades.

Also, research studies have revealed a major gap of performance on Advanced Highers examinations between different schools sectors (i.e. private schools' students attaining, on average, higher results than state schools' students).

=== A-levels and Advanced Highers ===
Some English Universities, such as Oxford University and Cambridge University, have specific entry requirements for Scottish students which are set on the basis of Advanced Highers. At Cambridge, courses with a minimum offer level of A*AA generally require A1, A2, A2 in Advanced Highers, while courses with a minimum offer level of A*A*A, offers are usually A1, A1, A2 in Advanced Highers. Offers are usually based on achieving particular grades and specific bands within those grades. At Oxford, conditional offers will usually be for AAB if a student is able to take three Advanced Highers; where this is not possible, a student would be expected to achieve AA in two Advanced Highers, as well as an A grade in an additional Higher course taken in S6.

== Subjects ==
The following subjects are available at Advanced Higher:

- Accounting
- Art and Design (Design)
- Art and Design (Expressive)
- Biology
- Business Management
- Cantonese
- Chemistry
- Classical Studies
- Computing Science
- Cruinn-eòlas
- Design and Manufacture
- Drama
- Eachdraidh
- Economics
- Engineering Science
- English
- French
- Gaelic (Learners)
- Gàidhlig
- Geography
- German
- Graphic Communication
- Health and Food Technology
- History
- Italian
- Latin
- Mandarin (Simplified)
- Mandarin (Traditional)
- Matamataig
- Mathematics
- Mathematics of Mechanics
- Modern Studies
- Music
- Music Technology
- Music: Portfolio
- Nuadh-eòlas
- Physical Education
- Physics
- Religious, Moral and Philosophical Studies
- Spanish
- Statistics

While all these subjects are possible, some schools choose not to run them as they can be seen as very difficult I.E Advanced Higher Drama is not offered in majority schools across the country and very few pick it if it’s an option.

== See also ==
- Higher (Scottish)
- Scottish Leaving Certificate
- Scottish Qualifications Authority
- National Qualifications
- GCE Advanced Level (United Kingdom)
