= Second MacDonald shadow cabinet =

Second MacDonald Shadow Cabinet
- Shadow Cabinet of the United Kingdom
- 21 November 1924–5 June 1929
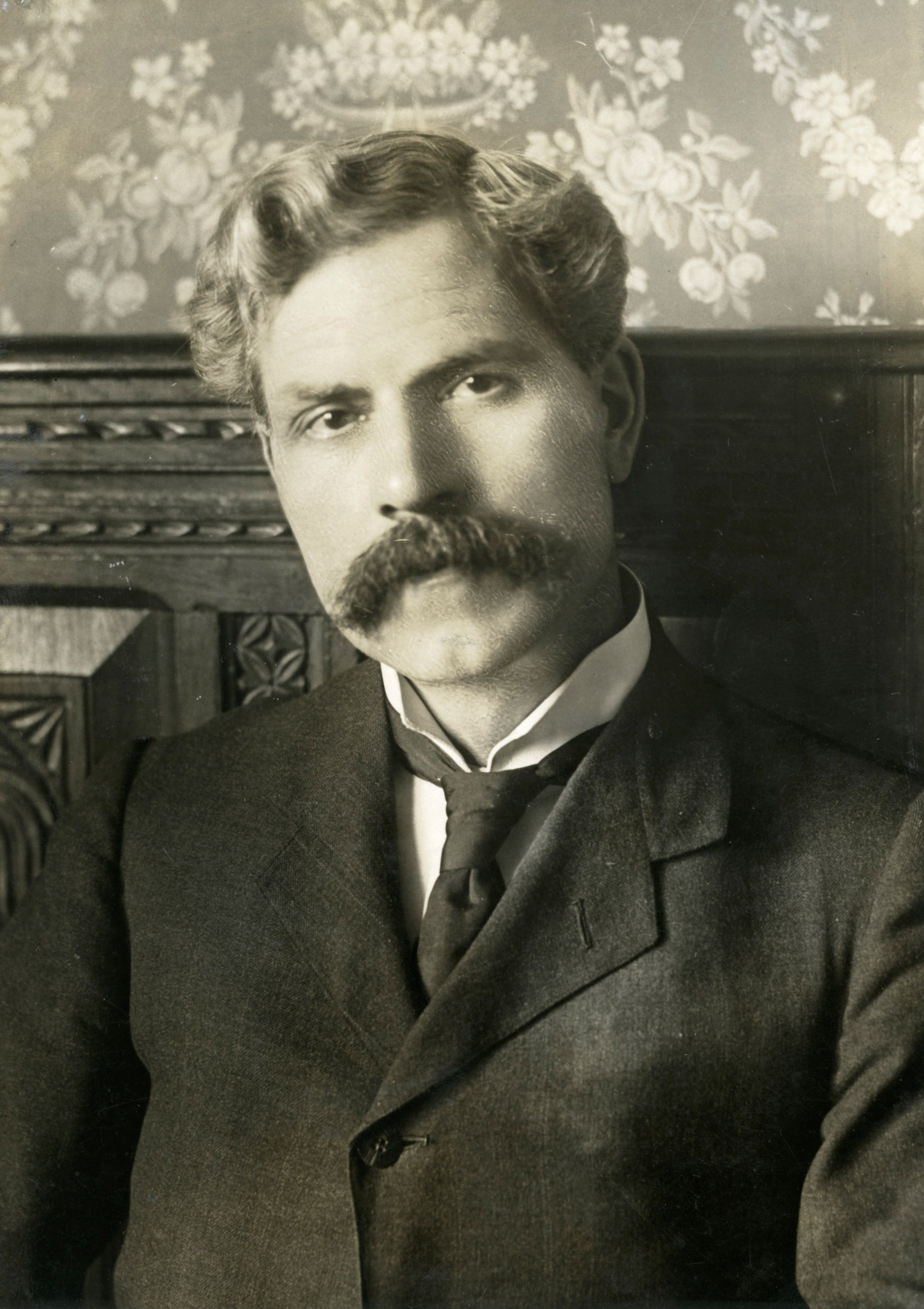
- MacDonald c. 1924–1929
- Date formed: 21 November 1924
- Date dissolved: 5 June 1929

People and organisations
- Monarch: George V
- Leader of the Opposition: Ramsay MacDonald
- Deputy Leader of the Opposition: J. R. Clynes
- Member party: Labour Party
- Status in legislature: Official Opposition 151 / 615 (25%)

History
- Legislature terms: 1924 UK Parliament
- Predecessor: First Shadow Cabinet of Stanley Baldwin
- Successor: Second Shadow Cabinet of Stanley Baldwin

Ramsay MacDonald began his second term as Leader of the Opposition after the fall of the first MacDonald ministry and Labour's defeat in the 1924 general election, which saw it return as the Official Opposition. In accordance with the precedent set by MacDonald's first shadow cabinet, a shadow cabinet election was held in the Parliamentary Labour Party (PLP) in December 1924 to form a new shadow cabinet. Most members of this shadow cabinet went on to serve in the second MacDonald ministry after Labour's victory in the 1929 general election.

After the fall of the first MacDonald ministry in 1924 – the first Labour ministry in history – the former members of MacDonald's cabinet formed a temporary shadow cabinet, in line with the traditional Liberal and Conservative model of a party's former ministers forming the shadow cabinet. After some discussion by the senior members of the party, it was decided that Labour would retain the system of democratically elected shadow cabinets as adopted for its first shadow cabinet in 1923. Elections were held in December 1924, 1925, 1926 and 1927, with Labour peers also allowed to join the shadow cabinet from 1925 with the addition of Labour's chief whip in the House of Lords.

== Background ==
At the 1922 general election, the Labour Party superseded the Liberal Party as the main rival to the Conservative Party in the British political system, winning more seats and becoming the Official Opposition for the first time in its history. Under its leader Ramsay MacDonald, the Parliamentary Labour Party (PLP) agreed to democratically elect the party's first shadow cabinet in February 1923. Traditionally, shadow cabinets were formed from the former ministers of the opposition party from the last time they were in government, but as the Labour Party was never in government before it was unable to do so, instituting a new system of shadow cabinet elections instead, with 12 MPs serving as elected members and three MPs, the Labour leader, deputy leader and chief whip in the House of Commons, serving as ex officio members.

After the 1923 general election, MacDonald formed the first MacDonald ministry, the first Labour government in history, which served as a minority government supported by the Liberals against the Conservatives, who could not pass their King's Speech after they failed to secure a majority. Most members of the first shadow cabinet joined the government, though some such as George Lansbury and Tom Johnston were not appointed. The first MacDonald ministry only served for 11 months, from January to November 1924, before it collapsed after the Liberals withdrew their support. At the general election which followed, both Labour and the Liberals suffered losses to a resurgent Conservative Party led by Stanley Baldwin, which won a landslide victory after the publication of the Zinoviev letter, a forged letter which purported to show plans for a Soviet-backed communist revolution under a Labour government.

In the aftermath of the 1924 general election, the former members of MacDonald's cabinet convened to form an interim shadow cabinet, in line with the Liberal and Conservative model of a shadow cabinet formed from former ministers. In November, MacDonald and his four most senior allies, Arthur Henderson, J. R. Clynes, J. H. Thomas and Philip Snowden, met at the home of Beatrice and Sidney Webb to discuss the organisation of the PLP over the new parliamentary term, including the formation of a permanent shadow cabinet, as there were no standing orders in place for forming one in the aftermath of a Labour government. There was a proposal for a new system, where an appointed shadow cabinet of former ministers would serve alongside an elected backbench executive committee, however it was ultimately agreed to maintain the precedent set by MacDonald's first shadow cabinet, with a new shadow cabinet elected and taking over from the interim cabinet in December 1924.

== History ==
MacDonald's interim shadow cabinet included the former cabinet ministers of his government. In line with the precedent set by his first shadow cabinet, the permanent shadow cabinet elected in December 1924 included 12 elected members and three ex officio members, Ramsay MacDonald as leader of the Labour Party, J. R. Clynes as deputy leader of the Labour Party and Ben Spoor as chief whip of the Labour Party, who was elected by the PLP to succeed outgoing chief whip Arthur Henderson at the start of the new parliamentary term. Henderson returned as chief whip in 1925. From that year, the PLP also agreed to allow Labour peers in the House of Lords to join the shadow cabinet with an ex officio seat granted to Labour's chief whip in the Lords, then Herbrand Sackville, 9th Earl De La Warr. Provisions were also introduced for backbench Labour peers to elect their own representative on the shadow cabinet, with Sydney Arnold, 1st Baron Arnold joining the shadow cabinet, bringing the total number of members to 17. Despite this, the leader of the Labour Party in the House of Lords was still not given a seat in the shadow cabinet until later, which led to a breakdown of coordination between the party's peers and MPs.

Following the first election to the shadow cabinet in 1924, the shadow cabinet included four members who were elected to the first Labour shadow cabinet in 1923, including Snowden, Thomas, John Wheatley and George Lansbury, as well as eight newly elected members, including Henderson (who served in the first Labour shadow cabinet as the ex officio chief whip), William Graham, Hastings Lees-Smith, James Maxton, Frederick Roberts, Robert Smillie, Josiah Wedgwood and Charles Trevelyan, the latter two of whom had served in the first MacDonald ministry. Further elections were held in 1925, 1926 and 1927, with the composition of the shadow cabinet remaining largely the same from 1925 onwards. Like with other early Labour shadow cabinets, elected members did not have designated portfolios to shadow ministers, as this practice was not introduced until Clement Attlee introduced it as leader in 1955.

In December 1925, left-wing members of the shadow cabinet linked to the Independent Labour Party and Red Clydeside movement, including Wedgwood, Wheatley, Maxton and Lansbury, led a rebellion of 30 left-wing Labour MPs against MacDonald's leadership over his handling of unemployment. MacDonald had adopted a policy of collaboration with the Conservative government on this matter, however the left-wing MPs felt this failed to secure enough concessions from the government and wanted the party to adopt a new strategy of obstructionist and militant tactics, threatening to use their numbers to bring parliamentary business to a complete standstill. After a series of negotiations between MacDonald and the MPs, a compromise was reached where Labour would adopt a more aggressive and oppositional approach than MacDonald supported, with left-wing MPs also allowed to defy the party whip to pursue an even more militant approach should they wish.

While this defused the backbench rebellion, Wedgwood, Wheatley, Maxton and Lansbury remained opposed to the party's approach and announced a boycott of the 1925 shadow cabinet election, though only Maxton followed through with this. At the election, only Lansbury retained his seat, with all other members coming from the right of the party. Newcomers elected to the shadow cabinet included Tom Shaw and Sidney Webb, who served in MacDonald's first shadow cabinet, Hugh Dalton, Stephen Walsh and William Adamson, who had already informally served on the shadow cabinet as a spokesman on Scottish affairs from December 1924 after his tenure as the secretary of state for Scotland in MacDonald's government.

The membership of the shadow cabinet stabilised from 1925 onwards, with 10 of the 12 elected members to the shadow cabinet retaining their spots in the 1926 and 1927 shadow cabinet elections. Webb remained a member of the shadow cabinet until he resigned as an MP in 1929. During this period, Tom Johnston, who served in MacDonald's first shadow cabinet, returned to the shadow cabinet. In February 1926, the PLP voted to give shadow cabinet members the right to sit on the opposition frontbench. Previously, the PLP had vested the power to decide who could sit on the frontbench to MacDonald alone.

After the 1929 general election, which produced a hung parliament with Labour winning the most seats, MacDonald formed his second ministry with the support of the Liberal Party. The next Labour shadow cabinet was formed by Arthur Henderson in 1931, after MacDonald and some of his ministers left the Labour Party to form the National Government with the Conservatives and some of the Liberals after the collapse of the Labour minority government in the wake of the Great Depression.

== See also ==
- Second Baldwin ministry
