= Conservative government, 1922–1924 =

Government of the United Kingdom

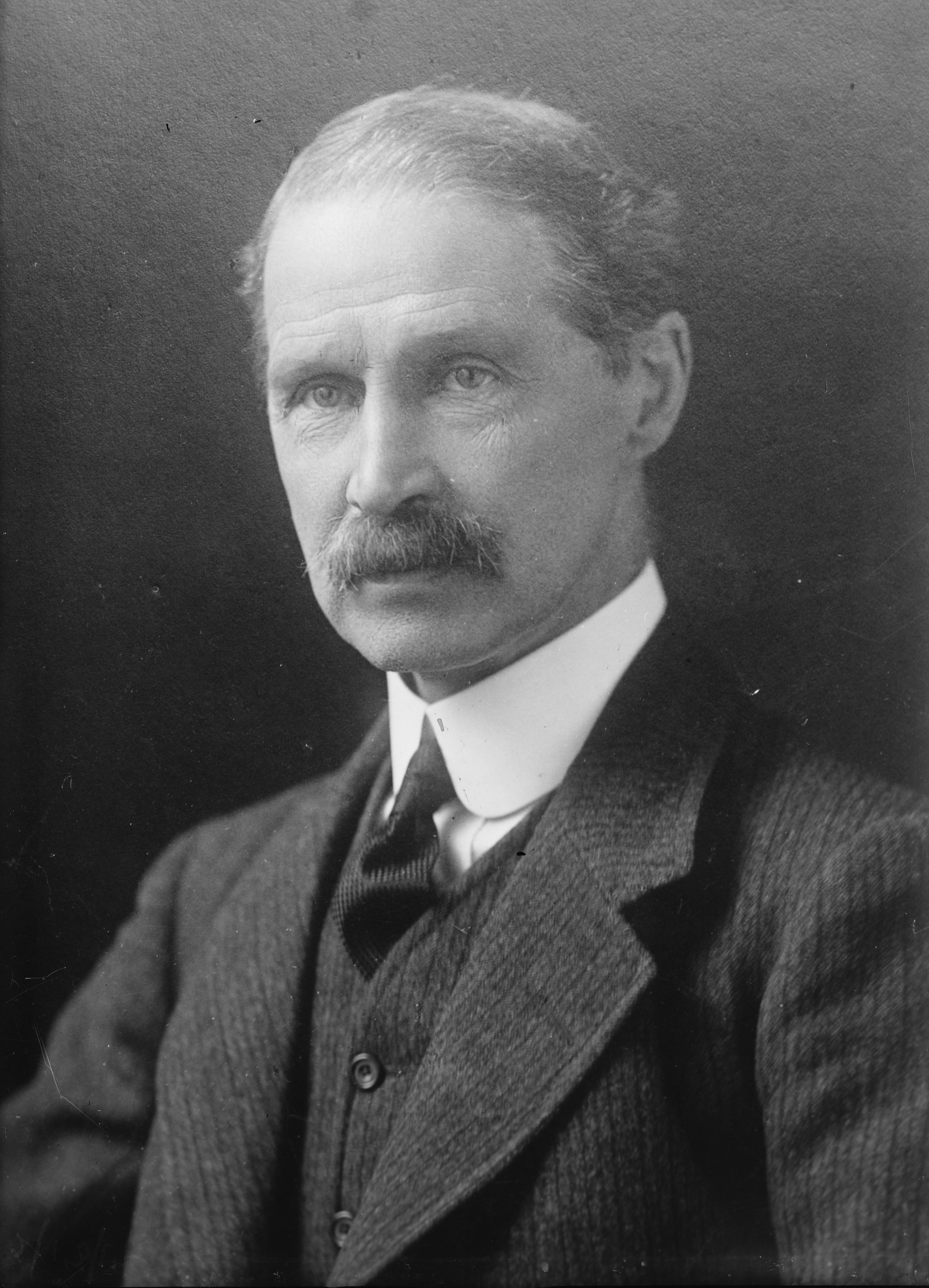
Bonar Law led the British Government from 1922–1923 and was succeeded by Stanley Baldwin.

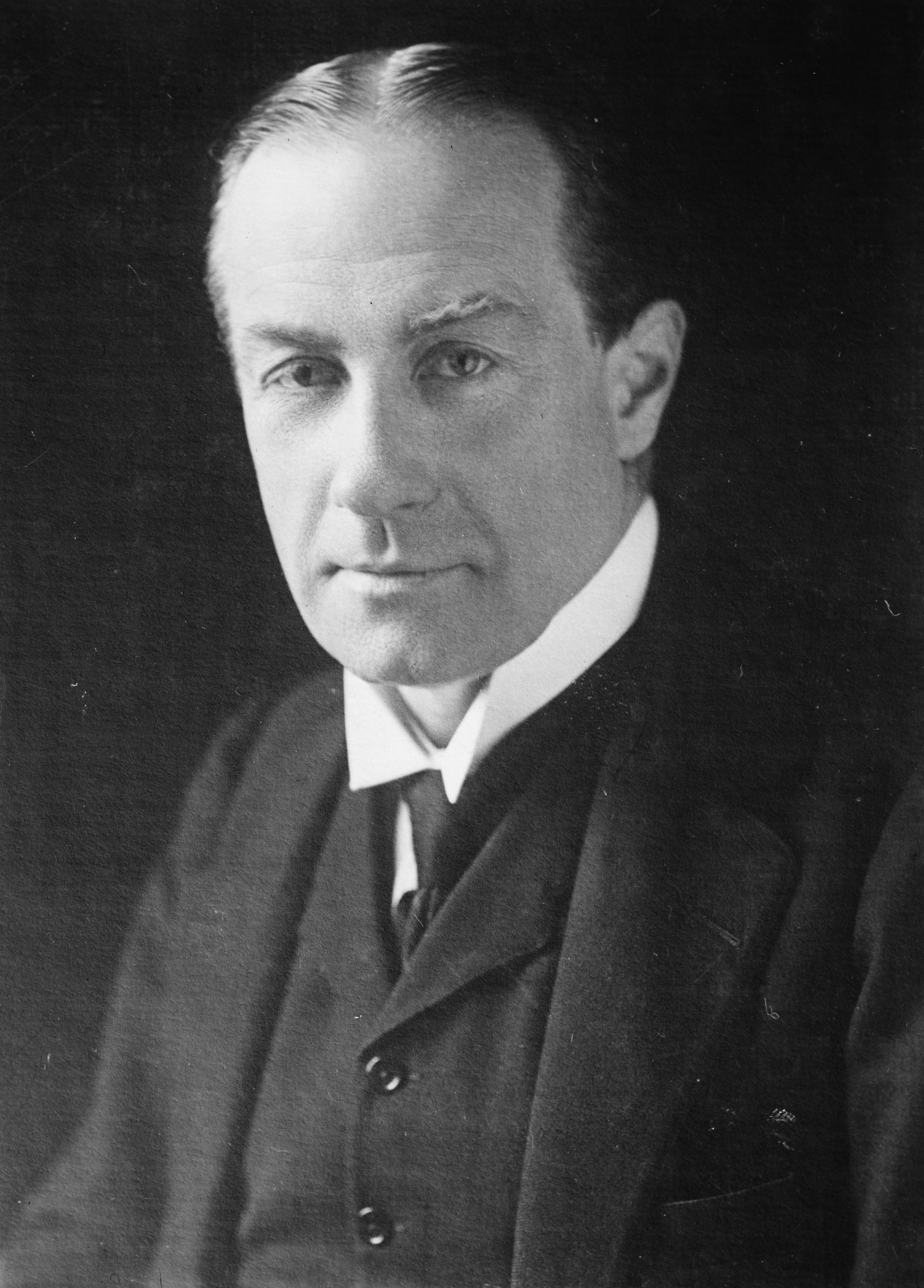
Baldwin led the Government through 1924. He resigned after losing the confidence of the House of Commons.

The Conservative Government of the United Kingdom that began in 1922 and ended in 1924 consisted of two ministries: the Law ministry (from 1922 to 1923) and then the first Baldwin ministry (from 1923 onwards).

The government was led by Bonar Law and Stanley Baldwin, appointed respectively as Prime Minister by King George V.

== Cabinets ==
=== Law's cabinet, October 1922 – May 1923 ===
Law ministry
- 1922–1923
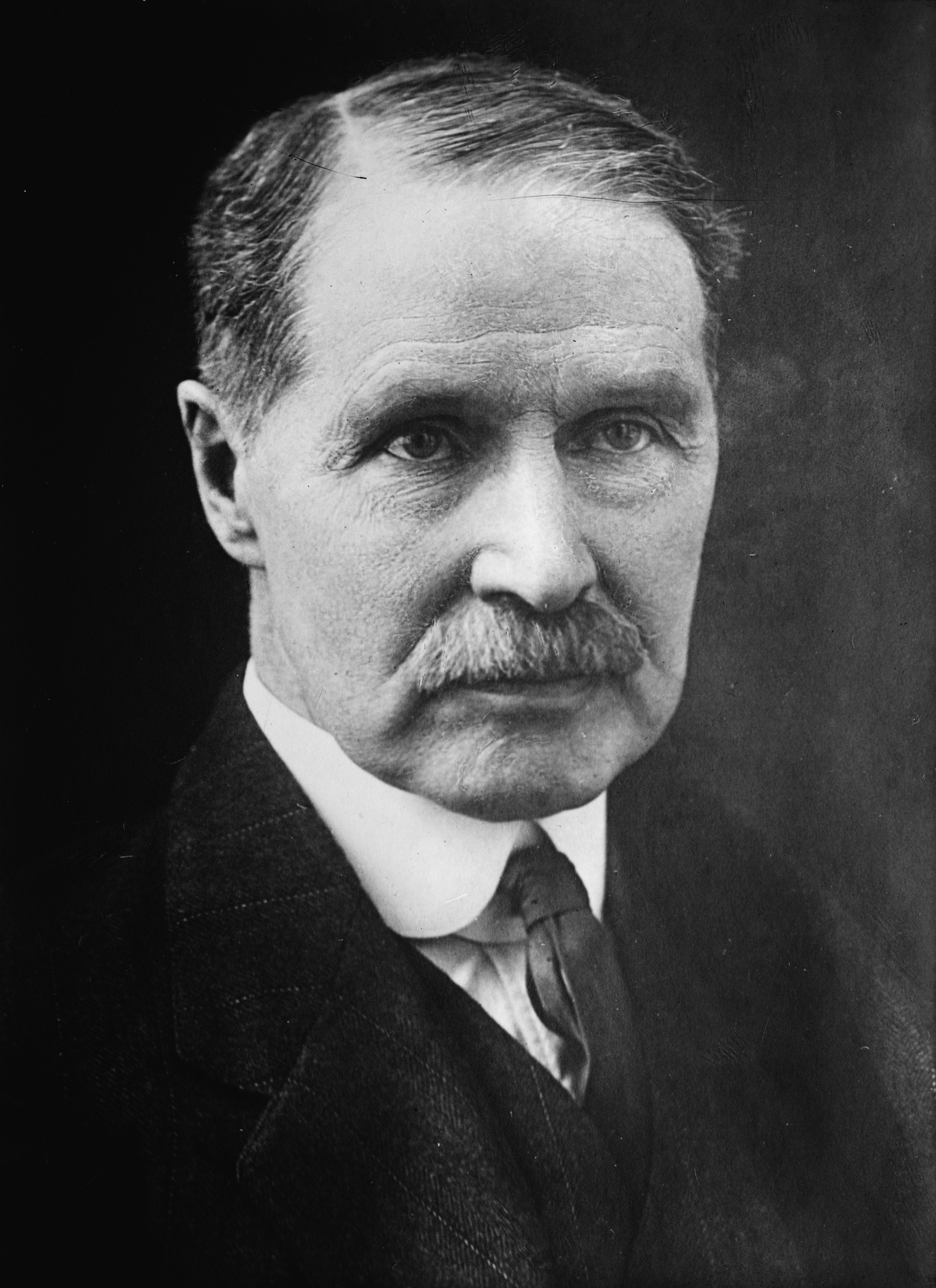
- Bonar Law
- Date formed: 23 October 1922
- Date dissolved: 20 May 1923

People and organisations
- Monarch: George V
- Prime Minister: Bonar Law
- Member party: Conservative Party
- Status in legislature: Majority
- Opposition party: Labour Party
- Opposition leaders: Ramsay MacDonald

History
- Election: 1922 general election
- Legislature terms: 31st UK Parliament; 32nd UK Parliament
- Predecessor: Lloyd George ministry
- Successor: First Baldwin ministry

- Bonar Law – Prime Minister and Leader of the House of Commons
- George Cave, 1st Viscount Cave – Lord High Chancellor of Great Britain
- James Edward Hubert Gascoyne-Cecil, 4th Marquess of Salisbury – Lord President of the Council and Chancellor of the Duchy of Lancaster
- Stanley Baldwin – Chancellor of the Exchequer
- William Clive Bridgeman – Secretary of State for the Home Department
- George Curzon, 1st Marquess Curzon of Kedleston – Secretary of State for Foreign Affairs and Leader of the House of Lords
- Victor Cavendish, 9th Duke of Devonshire – Secretary of State for the Colonies
- Edward George Villiers Stanley, 17th Earl of Derby – Secretary of State for War
- William Peel, 1st Earl Peel – Secretary of State for India
- Ronald Munro Ferguson, 1st Viscount Novar – Secretary for Scotland
- Leo Amery – First Lord of the Admiralty
- Sir Philip Lloyd-Greame – President of the Board of Trade
- Sir Robert Sanders – Minister of Agriculture and Fisheries
- Edward Wood – President of the Board of Education
- Sir Anderson Barlow – Minister of Labour
- Sir Arthur Griffith-Boscawen – Minister of Health

==== Changes ====
- April 1923 – Griffith-Boscawen resigned as Minister of Health after losing his seat and was succeeded by Neville Chamberlain.

=== Baldwin's cabinet, May 1923 – January 1924 ===
First Baldwin ministry
- 1923–1924
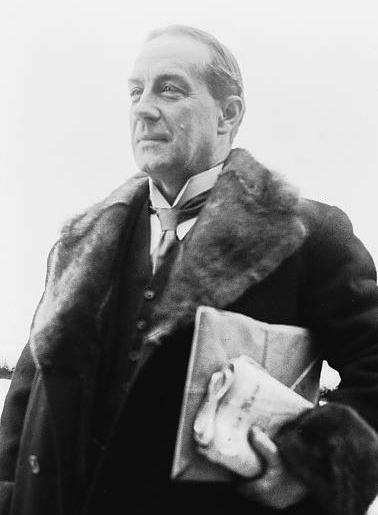
- Stanley Baldwin
- Date formed: 22 May 1923
- Date dissolved: 22 January 1924

People and organisations
- Monarch: George V
- Prime Minister: Stanley Baldwin
- Member party: Conservative Party
- Status in legislature: Majority (1923); Minority (1923–24)
- Opposition party: Labour Party
- Opposition leaders: Ramsay MacDonald

History
- Election: 1922 general election
- Outgoing election: 1923 general election
- Legislature terms: 32nd UK Parliament; 33rd UK Parliament
- Predecessor: Law ministry
- Successor: First MacDonald ministry

- Stanley Baldwin – Prime Minister, Chancellor of the Exchequer and Leader of the House of Commons
- George Cave, 1st Viscount Cave – Lord High Chancellor of Great Britain
- James Gascoyne-Cecil, 4th Marquess of Salisbury – Lord President of the Council
- Robert Cecil, 1st Viscount Cecil of Chelwood – Lord Keeper of the Privy Seal (Viscount Cecil of Chelwood from 28 December 1923)
- William Clive Bridgeman – Secretary of State for the Home Department
- George Nathaniel Curzon, 1st Marquess Curzon of Kedleston – Secretary of State for Foreign Affairs and Leader of the House of Lords
- Victor Cavendish, 9th Duke of Devonshire – Secretary of State for the Colonies
- Edward George Villiers Stanley, 17th Earl of Derby – Secretary of State for War
- William Peel, 1st Earl Peel – Secretary of State for India
- Sir Samuel Hoare – Secretary of State for Air
- Ronald Munro Ferguson, 1st Viscount Novar – Secretary for Scotland
- Leo Amery – First Lord of the Admiralty
- Sir Philip Lloyd-Greame – President of the Board of Trade
- Sir Robert Sanders – Minister of Agriculture
- Edward Wood – President of the Board of Education
- Sir Anderson Barlow – Minister of Labour
- Neville Chamberlain – Minister of Health
- Sir William Joynson-Hicks – Financial Secretary to the Treasury
- Sir Laming Worthington-Evans, 1st Baronet – Postmaster-General

==== Changes ====
- August 1923 – Neville Chamberlain took over from Baldwin as Chancellor of the Exchequer. Sir William Joynson-Hicks succeeded Chamberlain as Minister of Health. Joynson-Hicks' successor as Financial Secretary to the Treasury was not in the Cabinet.

== List of ministers ==
Members of the Cabinet are shown in bold face.

| Office | Name | Dates |
|---|---|---|
| Prime Minister First Lord of the Treasury Leader of the House of Commons | **Bonar Law** | 23 October 1922 – 20 May 1923 |
| Prime Minister First Lord of the Treasury Leader of the House of Commons | **Stanley Baldwin** | 22 May 1923 – 22 January 1924 |
| Chancellor of the Exchequer | **Stanley Baldwin** | 27 October 1922 |
| Chancellor of the Exchequer | **Neville Chamberlain** | 27 August 1923 |
| Financial Secretary to the Treasury | John Waller Hills | 6 November 1922 |
| Financial Secretary to the Treasury | Archibald Boyd-Carpenter | 12 March 1923 |
| Financial Secretary to the Treasury | **Sir William Joynson-Hicks** | 25 May 1923 |
| Financial Secretary to the Treasury | Walter Guinness | 5 October 1923 |
| Parliamentary Secretary to the Treasury | Leslie Orme Wilson | 31 October 1922 |
| Parliamentary Secretary to the Treasury | Bolton Eyres-Monsell | 25 July 1923 |
| Junior Lords of the Treasury | Douglas King | 31 October 1922 – 22 January 1924 |
| Junior Lords of the Treasury | Albert Buckley | 31 October 1922 – 12 March 1923 |
| Junior Lords of the Treasury | George Hennessy | 11 December 1922 – 22 January 1924 |
| Junior Lords of the Treasury | Frederick Thomson | 7 February 1923 – 10 April 1923 |
| Junior Lords of the Treasury | William Cope | 20 March 1923 – 22 January 1924 |
| Junior Lords of the Treasury | Patrick Ford | 10 April 1923 – 20 December 1923 |
| Junior Lords of the Treasury | Sir John Gilmour, 2nd Baronet | 20 December 1923 – 22 January 1924 |
| Lord Chancellor | **George Cave, 1st Viscount Cave** | 24 October 1922 |
| Lord President of the Council | **James Gascoyne-Cecil, 4th Marquess of Salisbury** | 24 October 1922 |
| Lord Privy Seal | vacant | |
| Lord Privy Seal | **Lord Robert Cecil** | 28 May 1923 |
| Secretary of State for Foreign Affairs and Leader of the House of Lords | **George Curzon, 1st Marquess Curzon of Kedleston** | 24 October 1922 |
| Under-Secretary of State for Foreign Affairs | Ronald McNeill | 31 October 1922 |
| Secretary of State for the Home Department | **William Bridgeman** | 24 October 1922 |
| Under-Secretary of State for the Home Department | George Frederick Stanley | 31 October 1922 |
| Under-Secretary of State for the Home Department | Godfrey Locker-Lampson | 12 March 1923 |
| First Lord of the Admiralty | **Leo Amery** | 24 October 1922 |
| Parliamentary and Financial Secretary to the Admiralty | Bolton Eyres-Monsell | 31 October 1922 |
| Parliamentary and Financial Secretary to the Admiralty | Archibald Boyd-Carpenter | 25 May 1923 |
| Civil Lord of the Admiralty | Victor Hope, 2nd Marquess of Linlithgow | 31 October 1922 |
| Minister of Agriculture and Fisheries | **Sir Robert Sanders** | 24 October 1922 |
| Parliamentary Secretary to the Ministry of Agriculture and Fisheries | Gilbert Heathcote-Drummond-Willoughby, 2nd Earl of Ancaster (Note: Also Deputy Minister of Fisheries.) | 31 October 1922 |
| Secretary of State for Air | Sir Samuel Hoare (Note: Entered the Cabinet 25 May 1923) | 31 October 1922 |
| Under-Secretary of State for Air | George Sutherland-Leveson-Gower, 5th Duke of Sutherland | 31 October 1922 |
| Secretary of State for the Colonies | **Victor Cavendish, 9th Duke of Devonshire** | 24 October 1922 |
| Under-Secretary of State for the Colonies | William Ormsby-Gore | 31 October 1922 |
| President of the Board of Education | **E. F. L. Wood** | 24 October 1922 |
| Parliamentary Secretary to the Board of Education | Lord Eustace Percy | 21 March 1923 |
| Parliamentary Secretary to the Board of Education | Richard Onslow, 5th Earl of Onslow | 25 May 1923 |
| Minister of Health | **Sir Arthur Griffith-Boscawen** | 24 October 1922 |
| Minister of Health | **Neville Chamberlain** | 7 March 1923 |
| Minister of Health | **Sir William Joynson-Hicks** | 27 August 1923 |
| Parliamentary Secretary to the Ministry of Health | Richard Onslow, 5th Earl of Onslow | 31 October 1922 |
| Parliamentary Secretary to the Ministry of Health | Lord Eustace Percy | 25 May 1923 |
| Secretary of State for India | **William Peel, 2nd Viscount Peel** | 24 October 1922 |
| Under-Secretary of State for India | Edward Turnour, 6th Earl Winterton | 31 October 1922 |
| Minister of Labour | **Anderson Barlow** | 31 October 1922 |
| Parliamentary Secretary to the Ministry of Labour | Archibald Boyd-Carpenter | 6 November 1922 |
| Parliamentary Secretary to the Ministry of Labour | Henry Betterton | 12 March 1923 |
| Chancellor of the Duchy of Lancaster | **James Gascoyne-Cecil, 4th Marquess of Salisbury** | 24 October 1922 |
| Chancellor of the Duchy of Lancaster | J. C. C. Davidson | 25 May 1923 |
| Paymaster General | vacant | |
| Paymaster General | Neville Chamberlain | 5 February 1923 |
| Paymaster General | Sir William Joynson-Hicks | 15 March 1923 |
| Paymaster General | Archibald Boyd-Carpenter | 25 May 1923 |
| Minister of Pensions | George Tryon | 31 October 1922 |
| Parliamentary Secretary to the Ministry of Pensions | Charles Curtis Craig | 13 February 1923 |
| Postmaster General | Neville Chamberlain | 31 October 1922 |
| Postmaster General | Sir William Joynson-Hicks | 7 March 1923 |
| Postmaster General | **Sir Laming Worthington-Evans, 1st Baronet** | 28 May 1923 |
| Secretary for Scotland | **Ronald Munro-Ferguson, 1st Viscount Novar** | 24 October 1922 |
| Parliamentary Secretary to the Ministry of Health for Scotland | James Kidd | 31 October 1922 |
| Parliamentary Secretary to the Ministry of Health for Scotland | Walter Elliot | 15 January 1923 |
| President of the Board of Trade | **Sir Philip Lloyd-Greame** | 24 October 1922 |
| Parliamentary Secretary to the Board of Trade | Roundell Palmer, Viscount Wolmer | 31 October 1922 |
| Secretary for Overseas Trade | Sir William Joynson-Hicks | 31 October 1922 |
| Secretary for Overseas Trade | Albert Buckley | 12 March 1923 |
| Secretary for Overseas Trade | none | 18 November 1923 |
| Secretary for Mines | George Lane-Fox | 6 November 1922 |
| Minister of Transport | Sir John Baird | 31 October 1922 |
| Parliamentary Secretary to the Ministry of Transport | Wilfrid Ashley | 31 October 1922 |
| Parliamentary Secretary to the Ministry of Transport | John Moore-Brabazon | 8 October 1923 |
| Secretary of State for War | **Edward Stanley, 17th Earl of Derby** | 24 October 1922 |
| Under-Secretary of State for War | Walter Guinness | 31 October 1922 |
| Under-Secretary of State for War | Wilfrid Ashley | 8 October 1923 |
| Financial Secretary to the War Office | Stanley Jackson | 31 October 1922 |
| Financial Secretary to the War Office | Rupert Gwynne | 15 March 1923 |
| First Commissioner of Works | Sir John Baird | 31 October 1922 |
| Parliamentary Secretary to the Office of Works | Wilfrid Ashley | 31 October 1922 |
| Parliamentary Secretary to the Office of Works | none | 8 October 1923 |
| Attorney General | Sir Douglas Hogg | 24 October 1922 |
| Solicitor General | Sir Thomas Inskip | 31 October 1922 |
| Lord Advocate | William Watson | 24 November 1922 |
| Solicitor General for Scotland | David Fleming | 6 November 1922 |
| Solicitor General for Scotland | Frederick Thomson | 5 April 1923 |
| Lord Steward of the Household | Anthony Ashley-Cooper, 9th Earl of Shaftesbury | 20 November 1922 |
| Lord Chamberlain of the Household | Rowland Baring, 2nd Earl of Cromer | 20 November 1922 |
| Vice-Chamberlain of the Household | Douglas Hacking | 20 November 1922 |
| Treasurer of the Household | George Gibbs | 6 November 1922 |
| Comptroller of the Household | Harry Barnston | 31 October 1922 |
| Assistant Whips | Richard Roundell | 27 November 1922 – 22 January 1924 |
| Assistant Whips | Philip Colfox | 27 November 1922 – 10 December 1923 |
| Master of the Horse | The Marquess of Bath | 20 November 1922 |
| Captain of the Gentlemen-at-Arms | George Villiers, 6th Earl of Clarendon | 20 November 1922 |
| Captain of the Yeomen of the Guard | Hylton Jolliffe, 3rd Baron Hylton | 20 November 1922 |
| Lords in Waiting | Arthur Annesley, 11th Viscount Valentia | 20 November 1922 – 22 January 1924 |
| Lords in Waiting | Savile Crossley, 1st Baron Somerleyton | 20 November 1922 – 22 January 1924 |
| Lords in Waiting | Orlando Bridgeman, 5th Earl of Bradford | 20 November 1922 – 22 January 1924 |
| Lords in Waiting | George Bingham, 5th Earl of Lucan | 20 November 1922 – 22 January 1924 |
| Lords in Waiting | James Harris, 5th Earl of Malmesbury | 20 November 1922 – 22 January 1924 |
| Lords in Waiting | Arnold Keppel, 8th Earl of Albemarle | 20 November 1922 – 22 January 1924 |

== See also ==
- First Shadow Cabinet of Ramsay MacDonald

| Preceded by Second Lloyd George ministry | Government of the United Kingdom; 1922–1924 | Succeeded by First MacDonald ministry |
