= National Qualifications =

Educational qualifications in Scotland

National Qualifications (NQs) are qualifications studied in secondary schools and colleges of further education in Scotland. There used to be three types of National Qualification - Standard Grades, National Courses and National Units.

== Standard Grades ==
Standard Grades are a now discontinued qualification. They were mainly studied over two years during the third and fourth years of secondary schooling. There were three level in Standard Grade—Credit, General and Foundation—with Credit passes normally being expected for pupils to have a reasonable prospect at success studying that subject at Higher level the following year.

== National Courses and Units ==
National Courses were first introduced in the 2013/2014 examination diet. They include Nationals 1-5, (New) Higher and (New) Advanced Higher. National 4 replaced Standard Grade General and National 5 replaced Standard Grade Credit. For more the most up-to-date information on Scottish qualifications, please visit the SQA website.

They were originally introduced as the step following on from Standard Grade and were offered at Higher level, but also at lower levels than Higher to allow further opportunities for pupils to progress. Immediately below Higher level was Intermediate 2 which was broadly the level of Credit at Standard Grade; below that Intermediate 1 which was broadly the level of General at Standard Grade. Access 3 was broadly the level of Foundation at Standard Grade, and below that Access 2 and Access 1 for those pupils who required additional learning support.

Above Higher level is Advanced Higher which would normally be studied by pupils who have passed a group of Highers but have decided to study at Secondary school for a sixth year before going on to University.

To pass a National Course (such as for example, Higher Mathematics), students had to pass a number of National Units that were internally assessed, as well as pass a final externally assessed examination. Unit assessments are unseen and should a student fail an assessment opportunity, only one re-sit opportunity is provided using a fresh unseen assessment. (A second re-sit opportunity is only allowed in exceptional circumstances.) Failure to pass a National Unit at Higher level would mean that a student would be unable to pass the National Course at Higher level that year, though they may successfully complete a number of National Units.

== See also ==
- List of further education colleges in Scotland
- Education in Scotland
