= Certificate of Sixth Year Studies =

Former educational qualification in Scotland

In the Scottish secondary education system, the Certificate of Sixth Year Studies (CSYS) was the highest level of qualification available to pupils from 1968 until circa 2000.

Overseen by the Scottish Examination Board (SEB), it was taken by students in their sixth year (final year) of secondary education (ages 16–18) and was available for a range of different subjects. Examinations were administered by the SEB (and latterly by its successor, the Scottish Qualifications Authority, which absorbed and replaced it eventually). Unlike the Standard and Higher Grade examinations, it was not a part of the Scottish Certificate of Education.

The CSYS followed on from Higher Grade examinations and was considered broadly equivalent to the English A-Level qualification. However, it never quite gained the same level of universal recognition as the Higher or A-Level. In particular, universities (at least in Scotland) rarely used it when considering potential students. The academic demands placed on students by these examinations were the highest of the Scottish secondary school examination system at that time. One important and distinguishing feature of the CSYS examinations (for some subjects) was the inclusion of a dissertation and/or viva examination conducted by a visiting external examiner.

The CSYS was replaced by the Advanced Higher examinations in 2000.

== See also ==
- Education in Scotland
- Higher
- Scottish Qualifications Authority
