= Scottish Certificate of Education =

Former educational qualification in Scotland

The Scottish Certificate of Education (or SCE) was a Scottish secondary education certificate, used in schools and sixth form institutions, from 1962 until 1999. It replaced the older Junior Secondary Certificate (JSC) and the Scottish Leaving Certificate (SLC), and it was the Scottish equivalent of the General Certificate of Education (or GCE), used in England, Wales and Northern Ireland. One primary distinction between the Scottish Leaving Certificate and the Scottish Certificate of Education was that the latter had less strict regulations in terms of compulsory subjects and workload of the individual curricula.

== Levels of Award ==
The SCE was intended to cater for the increased range of subjects available to pupils since the raising of the school leaving age from 14 to 15. It initially included examinations and awards at both Ordinary Grade ('O-Grade') and Higher Grade ('Higher'). The Ordinary Grade award was replaced with the Standard Grade award, and the Higher Grade award was revised, during second half of the 1980s. These changes placed increased emphasis on coursework and the application of knowledge within tests.

The now-obsolete Certificate of Sixth Year Studies (a qualification taken by many in their final year after passing the subject at Higher Grade) was not a part of the Scottish Certificate of Education. However, both were awarded by the Scottish Examination Board (and its successor, the Scottish Qualifications Authority).

== Successors ==
The Scottish Certificate of Education was replaced by the Scottish Qualifications Certificate (SQC) which was first issued from January 2000, after the last examinations of the Scottish Certificate of Education in 1999. The SQC also incorporated the CSYS (although this was in the final stages of being replaced with the Advanced Higher) and the Record of Education and Training (RET).

The SQC certifies the new qualifications that were introduced in 2014. These include the new National 3, 4 and 5 qualifications, revised Higher and Advanced Higher qualifications as part of the Curriculum for Excellence.

== See also ==
- Education in Scotland
- Scottish Qualifications Authority
- Advanced Higher
- Higher (Scottish)
- Scottish Qualifications Certificate (SQC)
- Certificate of Sixth Year Studies (CSYS)
