= Enterprise, Transport and Lifelong Learning Department =

The Enterprise, Transport and Lifelong Learning Department (ETLLD) was a former Scottish Executive department responsible for economic and industrial development, further and higher education, skills, lifelong learning, energy, transport and digital connectivity until 2007.

Philip Rycroft was appointed head of the department in May 2006 following the retirement of Eddie Frizzell. Rycroft was previously Head of Schools Group within the Scottish Executive Education Department.

It was the only Scottish Executive department based in Glasgow.

The Cabinet Secretary for Finance and Sustainable Growth (currently John Swinney MSP), assisted by the Minister for Transport and Infrastructure (currently Keith Brown MSP) and the Minister for Enterprise, Energy and Tourism (Jim Mather MSP) has responsibility for the Enterprise and Transport elements of the current Directorates. The Cabinet Secretary for Education and Lifelong Learning (currently Mike Russell MSP) has responsibility for the Lifelong Learning portfolio.

ETLLD was formerly the Enterprise and Lifelong Learning Department but was extended in May 2003 to include responsibility for Transport, in recognition of transport's crucial importance to economic growth.

After the SNP won office in 2007, the department was scrapped and replaced by the Education and Lifelong Learning Directorates.

== See also ==
- Economy of Scotland
- Education in Scotland
- Transport in Scotland
- Renewable energy in Scotland
- Forum for Renewable Energy Development in Scotland (FREDS)
