= Forum for Renewable Energy Development in Scotland =

Scottish partnership

The Forum for Renewable Energy Development in Scotland, also known as FREDS, is a partnership between industry, academia and Government aimed at enabling Scotland to capitalise on its significant renewable energy resource and thereby secure economic benefits.

Chaired by Jim Mather MSP, a priority for the group is to assist the Scottish Government achieve its 2020 target of 50% of electricity generated from renewable sources. The forum has produced a variety of studies, including "Hydrogen and Fuel Cell opportunities for Scotland", "Scotland's Renewable Heat Strategy: Recommendations to Scottish Ministers" and "Scottish Hydropower Resource Study 2008".

The FREDS sub-groups set up in 2009 cover renewable heat, micro-hydro, hydrogen and community renewables.
