= School boards in Scotland =

Defunct public bodies in Scotland

School boards in Scotland were involved in determining the overall policies, objectives and ethos at the school. Boards had a special duty to promote good relationships between the school, its parents and the community and also form a channel for the flow of information between these groups. School boards were introduced in 1988 as part of the Government's policy of encouraging parental involvement in schools. They comprised parent, teacher and "co-opted" members, with parents in the majority. "Co-opted" members may have been drawn from local business or the community.

== History ==
Historically, school boards operated in Scotland from 1872 to 1918.

A new wave of school boards were established by the School Boards Act 1988, which mandated that they be set up in education authority schools in Scotland. Boards consisted of elected parent and staff members and other members co-opted by the elected members.

Changes were made to the running of School Boards in the Standards in Scotland’s Schools etc. Act 2000, which included the possibility that parent members could be co-opted if not enough were elected for the board to continue.

They were abolished by the Scottish School Act 2006 introduced to the Scottish Parliament on 28 September 2005, which would see them replaced by a two-tier system of Parent Forums and Parent Councils.

== Role and powers ==
School boards were intended to provide input of parents into the provision of education at the local school, and to allow for the delegation of powers from regional authorities to schools.

The powers of boards included the ability to request information on schools in their area and the right to receive and comment on financial statements. A headteacher would need the school boards approval before spending the schools budget assigned for books and materials. While a board could nominate members to sit on a committee for appointing new staff, they had no role in firing staff, or the discipline of pupils.

== Composition and Establishment ==
The 1988 Act provided for elections for school boards to be held in all schools except for the very few schools whose roll is so small that there are insufficient parents to form a school board. Schools in which elections are required to be held are referred to as "eligible schools".

School boards were composed of parent members, staff members - meaning teaching staff, and co-opted members who were chosen by the board. Co-opted members would not be eligible as staff or parent members. The local Councillor and the Director of Education could also attend and speak at meetings. Board members hold office for four years, with half the parent places coming up for election every two years. The initial round of elections to school boards was held in 1989-1990.

School boards, the size and composition of which is laid down in the School Board Regulations 1989, were only established when sufficient parent members are elected through contested or uncontested regular elections, or by-elections. In cases where insufficient parents were elected to form a school board, a board could be established through the co-option of some parent members. Where a School Board did not exist, this is either because the school is a non-qualifying school, or because no board was formed as a result of a regular election, a by-election or under other provisions.

== See also ==
- Career and technical education
- Education
- Education in Scotland
- Board of education - US
- School boards in England and Wales
