= O-grade =

Former educational qualification in Scotland

The Ordinary Grade (commonly known as the "O-Grade") of the Scottish Certificate of Education is a now-discontinued qualification which was studied for as part of the Scottish secondary education system. It could be considered broadly equivalent to the old English O-Level qualification and is the predecessor to the Standard Grade.

Along with its more advanced sibling, the 'Higher Grade', the O-Grade was the bedrock of the Scottish educational system for many years. Its name refers to one of the two levels at which the Scottish Certificate of Education was awarded, the Higher Grade being the other. The term "O-Grade" can also be used to refer to a pass in a subject at that level, e.g. "He has seven O-Grades".

Courses were studied over two years, taking place during the third and fourth years (age 13-16) of a pupil's time at secondary school. They were available in a wide range of subjects.

A good pass at O-Grade would normally enable a pupil to take the same subject at Higher Grade in his or her fifth (or possibly sixth) year, if so desired. This did not always follow however, particularly as many more pupils left school at the end of their fourth year than is the case nowadays.

Over time, the O-Grade was gradually phased out and replaced by other educational assessments. Its replacement, the Standard Grade, focused more closely on coursework and the application of knowledge. The Standard Grade has eventually been replaced by the National 4/5 qualifications, as part of the introduction of the Curriculum for Excellence.

According to the BBC, Learning Minister Dr. Alasdair Allan and teachers in general claim that the change from the O-Grade system to the latter systems (Standard Grade & National 4/5 qualifications) was a major shake-up in the Scottish education system and involved excessive bureaucracy.

== See also ==
- Education in Scotland
- Scottish Qualifications Certificate
- Scottish Qualifications Authority
