= History of education in the United Kingdom =

For History of education in the United Kingdom, see:

- History of education in England
- History of education in Scotland
- History of education in Wales
- History of education in Northern Ireland
  - History of education in Ireland (pre 1922)
  - Education in Northern Ireland (post 1922)

== See also ==
- Education in the United Kingdom
