= History of education in England =

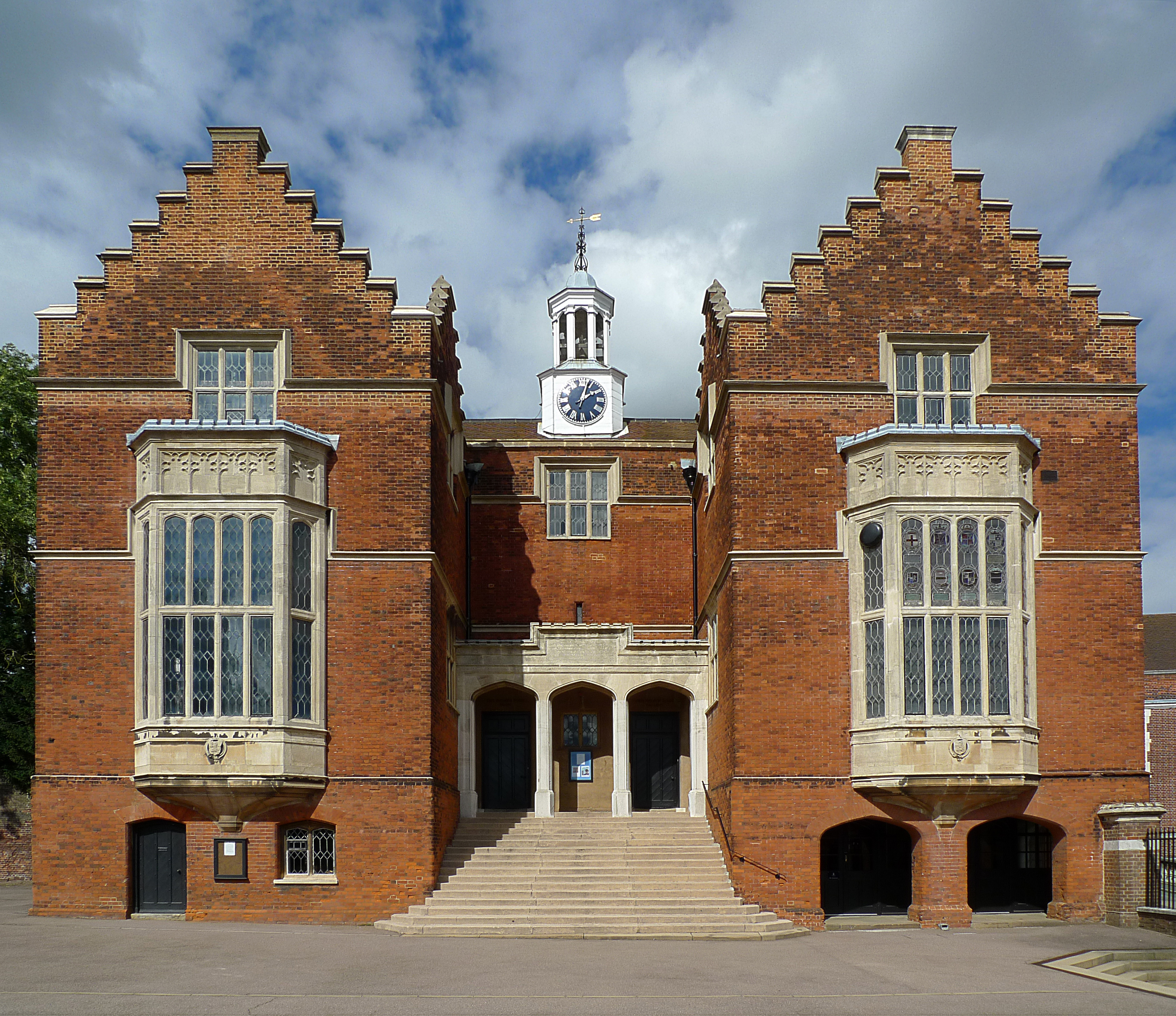
Harrow School is a prestigious boys' boarding school located in Harrow on the Hill, Greater London. Established in 1572, the school received its royal charter from Queen Elizabeth I, marking its significance in the history of education in England.

The history of education in England is documented from Saxon settlement of England, and the setting up of the first cathedral schools in 597 and 604.

Education in England remained closely linked to religious institutions until the nineteenth century, although charity schools and "free grammar schools", which were open to children of any religious beliefs, became more common in the early modern period. Nineteenth century reforms expanded education provision and introduced widespread state-funded schools. By the 1880s education was compulsory for children aged 5 to 10, with the school leaving age progressively raised since then, most recently to 18 in 2015.

The education system was expanded and reorganised multiple times throughout the 20th century, with a tripartite system introduced in the 1940s, splitting secondary education into grammar schools, secondary technical schools and secondary modern schools. In the 1960s this began to be phased out in favour of comprehensive schools. Further reforms in the 1980s introduced the National Curriculum and allowed parents to choose which school their children went to. Academies were introduced in the 2000s and became the main type of secondary school in the 2010s.

This history is closely related to the history of education in Wales, but Scotland has a separate system with a separate history.

== Medieval period ==
Prior to the arrival of Augustine of Canterbury in England in 597 education was an oral affair, or followed the Roman model in diaspora and integrated families.

The earliest known organised schools in England were connected to the church. Augustine established a church in Canterbury (which later became St Augustine's Abbey) in 598, which included a school for the study of religious texts, and in 604 this was joined by another school at what is now Rochester Cathedral. Further schools were established throughout the British Isles in the seventh and eighth centuries, generally following one of two forms: grammar schools to teach Latin, and song schools to train singers for cathedral choirs.

During the Middle Ages, schools were established to teach Latin grammar to the sons of the aristocracy destined for priesthood or monastic work with the ministry of government or the law. Two universities were established in affiliation with the church: the University of Oxford, followed by the University of Cambridge, to assist in the further training of the Catholic Christian clergy. A reformed system of "free grammar schools" was established in the reign of Edward VI; these too provided routes towards priesthood. Apprenticeship was the main way for youths to enter practical occupations.

== Early modern period ==
Endowed schools have a long history. The oldest, having been founded in 597 as a cathedral school, is King's School, Canterbury. Over time a group of the endowed schools became known as "public schools" to differentiate from private teaching by tutors and to indicate that they were open to the public regardless of religious beliefs, locality and social status. Charity school emerged in the 16th century with the purpose of educating poor children. Christ's Hospital is the most famous of these schools.

In Tudor England, Edward VI reorganised grammar schools and instituted new ones so that there was a national system of "free grammar schools." In theory these were open to all, offering free tuition to those who could not afford to pay fees. However, the vast majority of poor children did not attend academic schools; instead they grew up learning a trade or skill through which they could support themselves and their families.

The Protestant Reformation had a major influence on education and literacy in England, as it encouraged the reading of the Bible in English ("the vernacular").

In 1562 the Statute of Artificers and Apprentices was passed to regulate and protect the apprenticeship system, forbidding anyone from practising a trade or craft without first serving a 7-year period as an apprentice to a master. Guilds controlled many trades and used apprenticeships to control entry. (In practice sons of Freemen, members of the guilds, could negotiate shorter terms of training).

Following the Act of Uniformity in 1662, religious dissenters set up academies to educate students of dissenting families, who did not wish to subscribe to the articles of the established Church of England. Some of these 'dissenting academies' still survive, the oldest being Bristol Baptist College. Several Oxford colleges (Harris Manchester, Mansfield, and Regent's Park) are also descendants of this movement.

From 1692, 'parish' apprenticeships under the Elizabethan Poor Law came to be used as a way of providing for poor, illegitimate and orphaned children of both sexes alongside the regular system of skilled apprenticeships, which tended to provide for boys from slightly more affluent backgrounds. These parish apprenticeships, which could be created with the assent of two Justices of the Peace, supplied apprentices for occupations of lower status such as farm labouring, brickmaking and menial household service.

Until as late as the nineteenth century, all university fellows and many schoolmasters were expected or required to be in holy orders.

Historian David Mitch argues that private philanthropy was a major source of funding by the 1640s, and in that regard England was distinctive among modern nations. The endowments were permanent, and were still active in the 19th century. In addition to the landed elites in gentry, merchants and clergy were generous in supporting educational philanthropy. The national system that was developed in the last two thirds of the 19th century incorporated the earlier endowments.

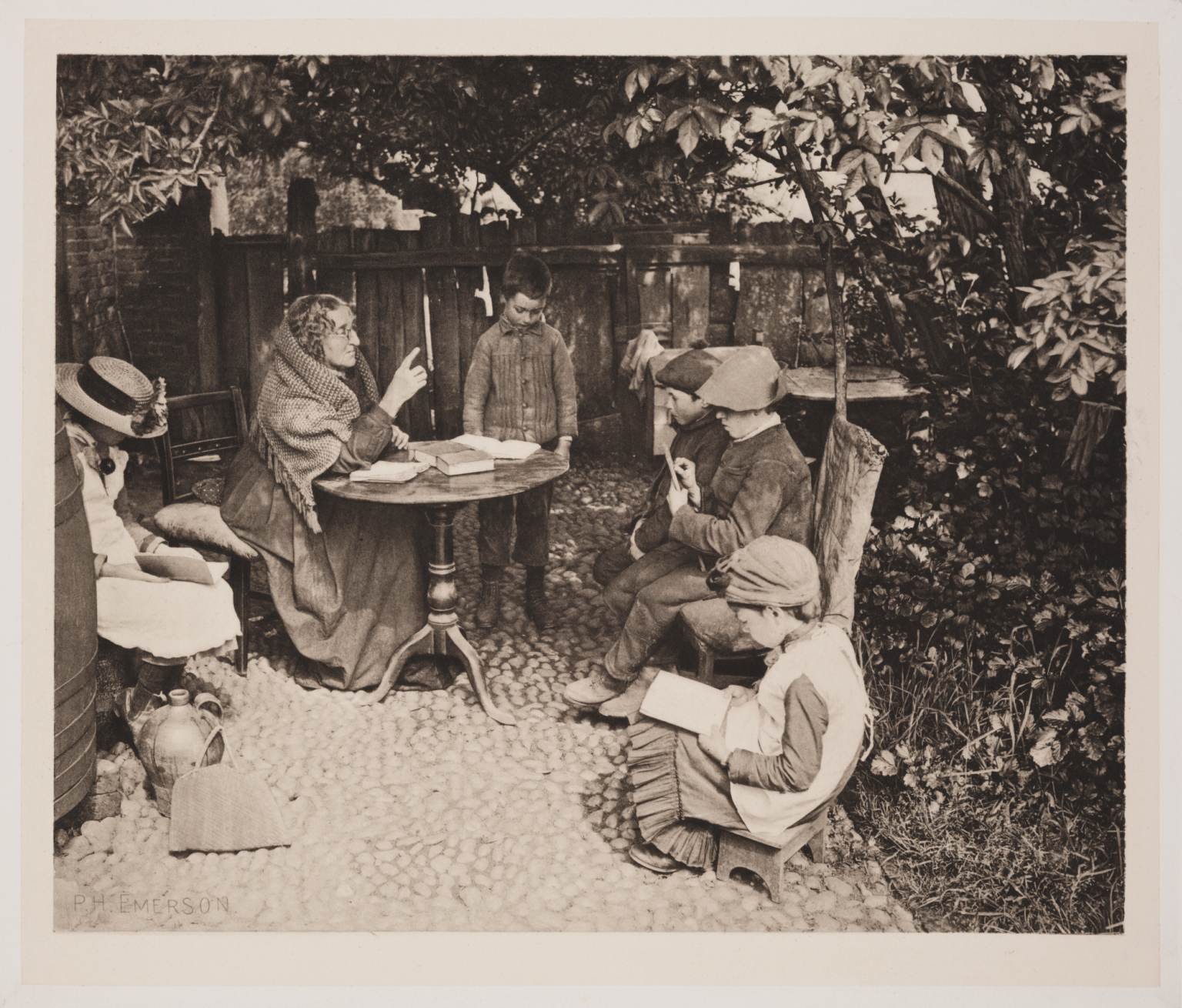
A late 19th century dame school class in East Anglia, England

=== Local Dame schools ===
Widows typically taught the three Rs (reading, writing and 'rithmetic) in dame schools, charity schools, or informal village schools. Dame schools were small operations for local children age two to five held in a neighbourhood house. They emerged in Britain and its colonies during the early modern period. These schools were taught by a “school dame,” an elderly local woman who would care for and teach ABCs in her home for a small fee. She was probably a widow, usually with cramped facilities.

At dame schools, children could be expected to learn reading and arithmetic, and were sometimes also educated in writing. Girls were often instructed in handiwork such as knitting and sewing. Dame schools lasted from the sixteenth century to about the mid-nineteenth century, when compulsory education was introduced in Britain. Dame schools were the precursors to present-day nursery and primary schools. Although sometimes ridiculed, there were many famous alumni, including Samuel Johnson and William Wordsworth for certain, and possibly Charles Dickens.

== 18th century ==
In the early years of the Industrial Revolution entrepreneurs began to resist the restrictions of the apprenticeship system, and a legal ruling established that the Statute of Apprentices did not apply to trades that were not in existence when it was passed in 1563, thus excluding many new 18th century industries.

In the 18th and 19th centuries, the Society for Promoting Christian Knowledge founded many charity schools for poor students in the 7 to 11 age group. These schools were the basis for the development of modern concepts of primary and secondary education. The Society also was an early provider of teacher education.

=== Sunday School Movement ===
Robert Raikes, a newspaper publisher and Anglican layman was one of the early pioneers of the Sunday School Movement. He started in Gloucester in 1780. Believing that vice would be better prevented than cured, he started with a school for boys in the slums. The best available time was Sunday, as the boys were often working in the factories the other six days. He started with teaching children to read the Bible and then having them learn the catechism, reasoning that reading comprehension acquired through Bible study could be transferred to secular studies. Raikes publicised the idea widely and it rapidly caught on. By 1785 upwards of 200,000 English children, and many adults, were attending Sunday Schools. A nondenominational national organisation, the Sunday School Society, was established to coordinate and develop them. According to Sherry Sherrod DuPree, in 1801 there were 2,290 Sunday Schools. With 23,135 in 1851, about two-thirds of all working-class children aged between 5 and 15 were attending them.

== 19th century ==
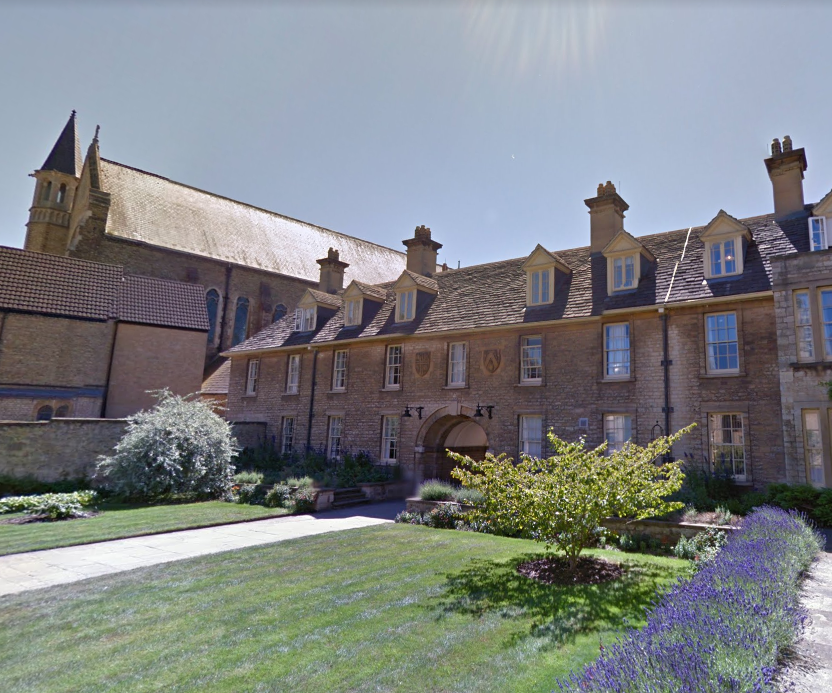
Somerville College, part of the University of Oxford, one of the first women's colleges in England (1879)

The education system reinforced class divisions through separate institutions for different social levels. The wealthy attended public schools and universities, the middle classes had grammar schools and private academies, while the working classes were served by elementary schools focused on basic literacy and moral instruction. This created distinct educational tracks that reflected and perpetuated social hierarchies. Education was an intense religious battleground between Anglicans and Nonconformists, and to a lesser extent the Catholics. This rivalry spurred educational expansion as different groups competed to establish schools.

=== Higher education ===
University College London was established as the first secular college in England, open to students of all religions (or none), followed by King's College London; the two institutions formed the University of London. Durham University was also established in the early nineteenth century. Towards the end of the century, the "redbrick" universities, new public universities, were founded.

Women could finally obtain a university degree after the establishment of Lady Margaret Hall (Oxford) Bedford College (London), Girton College (Cambridge) and Somerville College (Oxford) in the 19th century,

=== National schools and British Schools ===
Prior to the nineteenth century, most schools were run by church authorities and stressed religious education. In the early 19th century the Church of England sponsored most formal education until the government established free, compulsory education towards the end of that century.

The Church of England resisted early attempts for the state to provide secular education. In 1811, the Anglican National Society for Promoting the Education of the Poor in the Principles of the Established Church in England and Wales was established. The schools founded by the National Society were called National Schools. Most of the surviving schools were eventually absorbed into the state system under the Butler Act (1944), and to this day many state schools, most of them primary schools, maintain a link to the Church of England, reflecting their historic origins.

The Protestant non-conformist, non-denominational, or "British schools" were founded by Society for Promoting the Lancasterian System for the Education of the Poor, an organisation formed in 1808 by Joseph Fox, William Allen and Samuel Whitbread and supported by several evangelical and non-conformist Christians.

By 1831, Sunday School in Great Britain was ministering weekly to 1,250,000 children, approximately 25% of the population. As these schools preceded the first state funding of schools for the common public, they are sometimes seen as a forerunner to the current English school system.

=== Ragged schools ===
Ragged schools were small charitable organisations dedicated to the free education of destitute children. The schools were developed in working-class districts and intended for society's most impoverished youngsters who, it was argued, were often excluded from Sunday School education because of their unkempt appearance and often challenging behaviour. After a few such schools were set up in the early 19th century by individual reformers, the London Ragged School Union was established in April 1844 to combine resources in the city, providing free education, food, clothing, lodging, and other home missionary services for poor children. They were phased out by the final decades of the 19th century.

=== Government involvement ===
In August 1833, Parliament voted sums of money each year for the construction of schools for poor children, the first time the state had become involved with education in England and Wales (whereas a programs for universal education in Scotland had been initiated in the seventeenth century). A meeting in Manchester in 1837, chaired by Mark Philips, led to the creation of the Lancashire Public Schools' Association. The association proposed that non-denominational schools should be funded from local taxes.

Also in 1837, the Whig former Lord Chancellor Henry Brougham presented a bill for public education.

In 1839, government grants for the construction and maintenance of schools were switched to voluntary bodies and became conditional on a satisfactory inspection.

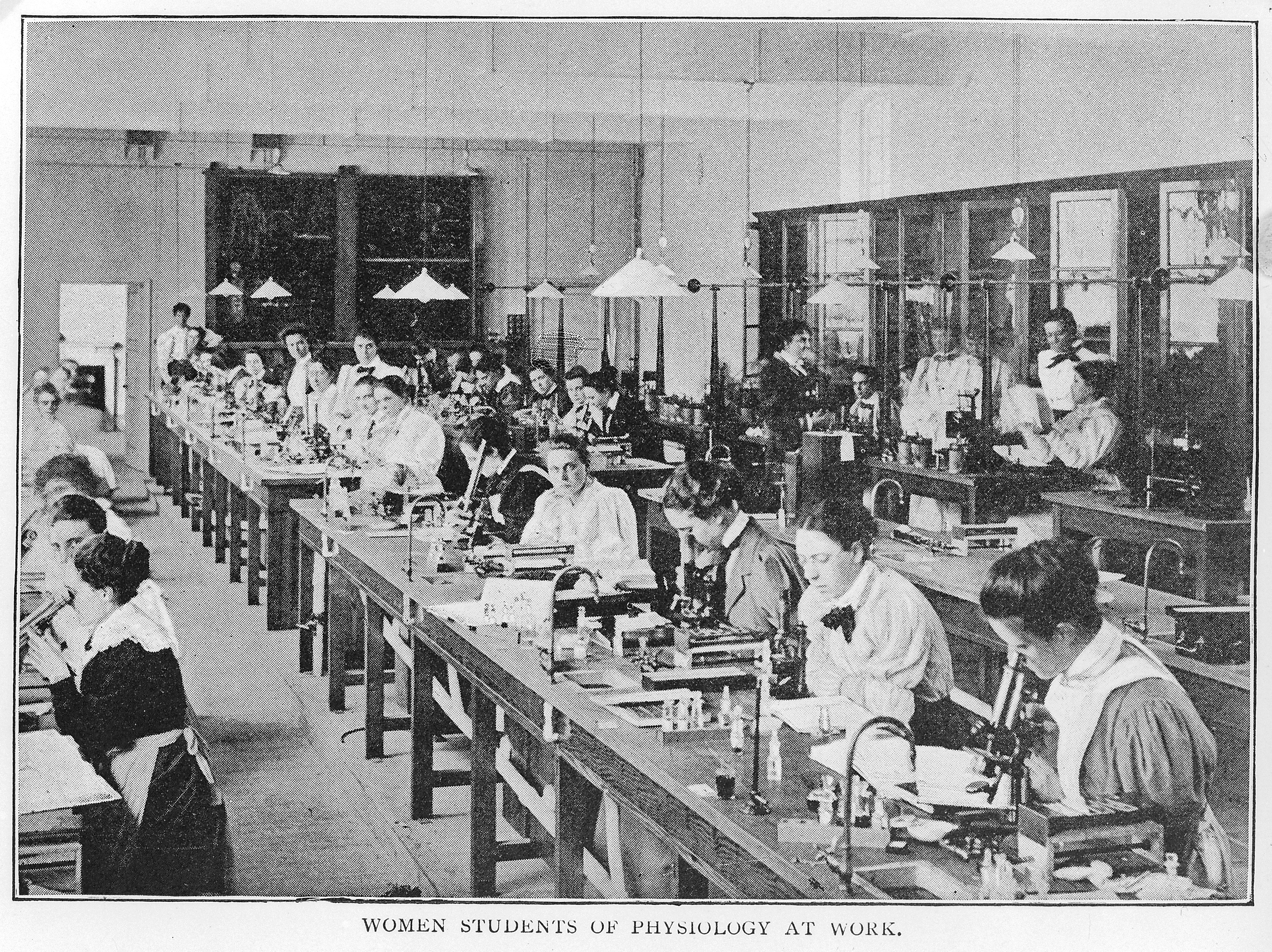
Women students of physiology studying in the London School of Medicine, Physiology Laboratory, 1899.

In 1840, the Grammar Schools Act expanded the Grammar School curriculum from classical studies to include science and literature. In 1861 the Royal Commission on the State of Popular Education in England, chaired by the Duke of Newcastle, reported "The number of children whose names ought [in summer 1858 in England and Wales] to have been on the school books, in order that all might receive some education, was 2,655,767. The number we found to be actually on the books was 2,535,462, thus leaving 120,305 children without any school instruction whatever."

In fee-charging public schools, which served the upper-class, important reforms were initiated by Thomas Arnold in Rugby. They redefined standards of masculinity, putting a heavy emphasis on sports and teamwork.

Robert Lowe (1811–1892), a powerful Liberal politician who worked closely with Prime Minister Gladstone, was a key reformer. He agreed with the consensus against too much centralisation in English education, but wanted to improve educational standards and prevent the waste of public money on inefficient teaching, especially in church schools. He introduced a revised code in 1861; future grants would be allocated not by the subjective judgement of inspectors but rather on the basis of the number of students passing an examination in reading, writing, and arithmetic. It was known as ‘payment by results’. The code ended the favouritism often shown by inspectors; it came under attack by schoolteachers, inspectors and Anglican and dissenting opponents of state activity.

=== Elementary Education Act 1870 ===
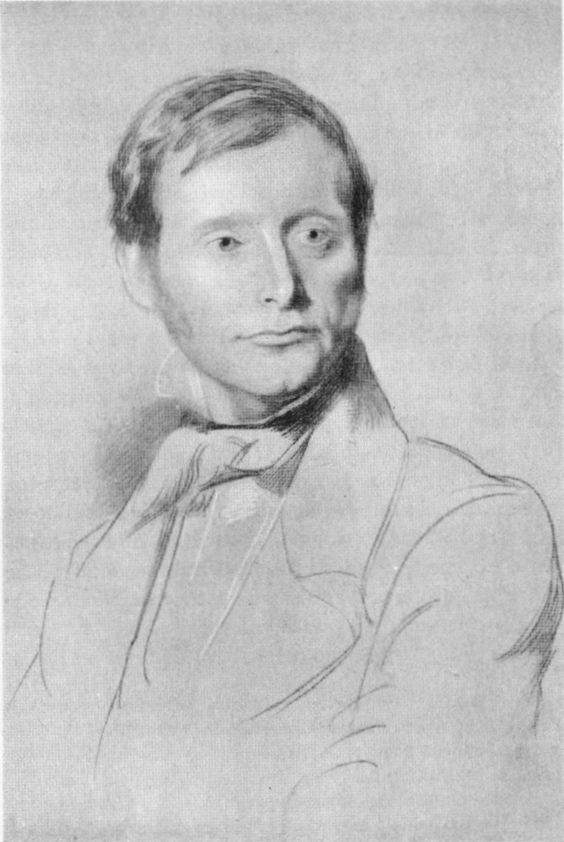
William Forster drafted the first Education Act in 1870.

Out of 4.3 million children of primary school age in England & Wales, 1 million were in purely voluntary schools and 1.3 million were in state aided schools, but 2 million had no access to schools whatsoever.

William Forster's Elementary Education Act 1870 (33 & 34 Vict. c. 75) required partially state-funded board schools to be set up to provide elementary (primary, in modern parlance) education in areas where existing provision was inadequate. Board schools were managed by elected school boards. The schools remained fee-charging, but poor parents could be exempted. The previous government grant scheme established in 1833 ended on 31 December 1870.

Section 74 of the act empowered school boards to, if they wished, make local byelaws making attendance compulsory between the ages of 5 and 13 but exempting any child aged over 10 who had reached the expected standard (which varied by board). Other exceptions included illness, if children worked, or lived too far from a school.

Two measures in the Act became, for religious reasons, matters of controversy within the governing Liberal Party. Firstly, nonconformists objected to their children being taught Anglican doctrine. As a compromise, William Cowper-Temple, a Liberal MP, proposed that religious teaching in the new state schools be non-denominational, avoiding points of dispute among the denominations. This became the famous Cowper-Temple clause (Section 14 of the Act). Section 7 gave parents the right to withdraw their children from any religious instruction, and to withdraw their children to attend any other religious instruction of their choice.

Secondly, Section 25 gave school boards the power to, if they chose, pay the fees of poor children attending voluntary (i.e. church) schools. Although few school boards actually did so, the provision caused great anger among nonconformists, who saw this as local ratepayers’ money being spent on Church of England schools. A large conference was held at Manchester in 1872 to lead resistance to the section, and one of the campaigners was the Birmingham politician Joseph Chamberlain, who emerged as a national figure for the first time. The resulting splits (some education campaigners, including Chamberlain, stood for Parliament as independent candidates) helped to cost the Liberals the 1874 election.

=== Compulsory and free primary education: 1880s and 1890s ===
The Elementary Education Act 1876 (39 & 40 Vict. c. 79) (the "Sandon Act") imposed a legal duty on parents to ensure that their children were educated. The Elementary Education Act 1880 (43 & 44 Vict. c. 23) (the "Mundella Act") required school boards to enforce compulsory attendance from 5 to 10 years, and permitted them to set a standard which children were required to reach before they could be employed. Poorer families were often tempted to send their children to work if the opportunity to earn an extra income was available. Attendance officers often visited the homes of children who failed to attend school, which often proved to be ineffective. Children who were employed were required to have a certificate to show they had reached the educational standard. Employers of these children who were unable to show this were penalised.

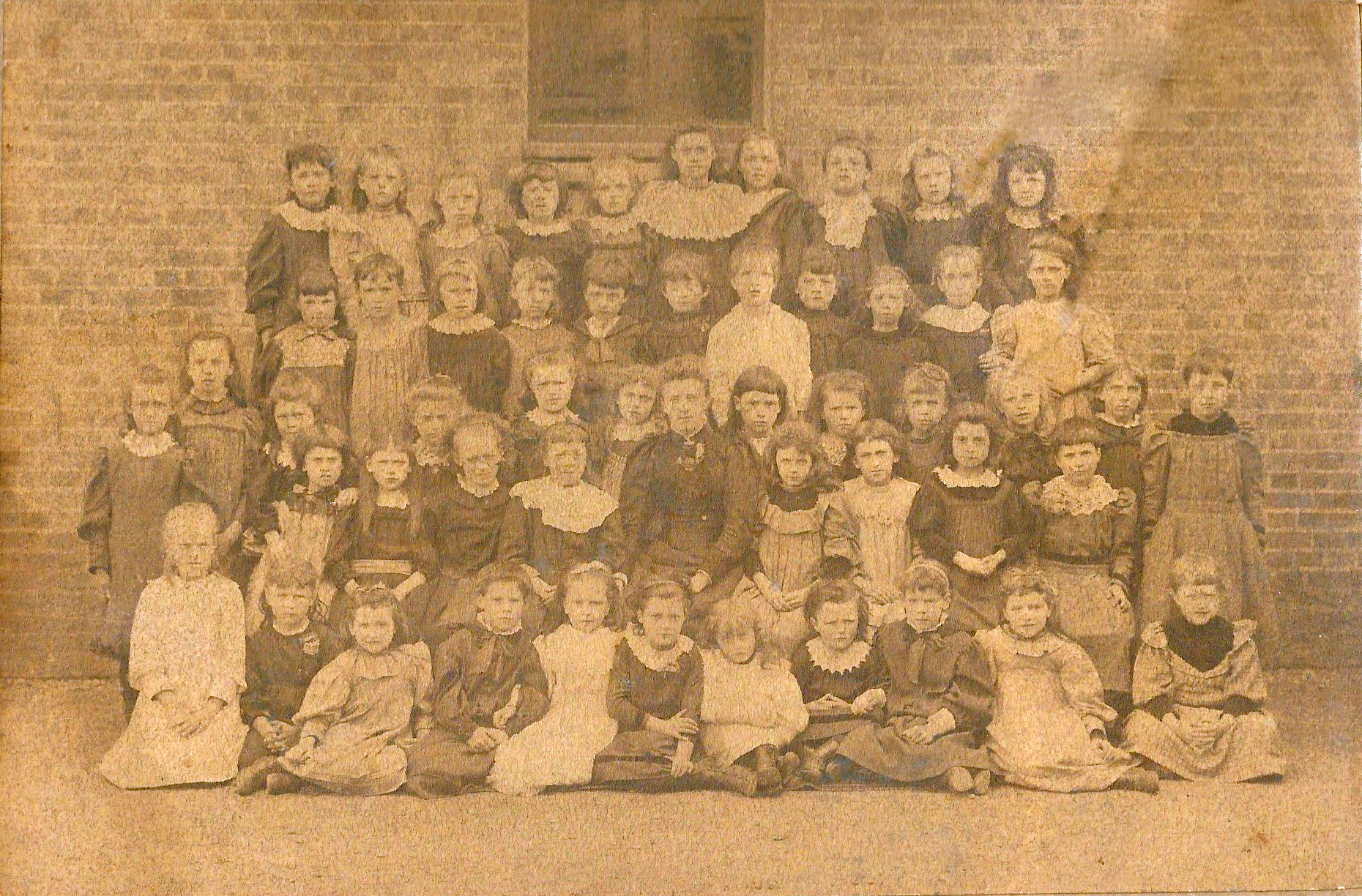
Victorian class photo

The Elementary Education Act 1891 (54 & 55 Vict. c. 56) provided for the state payment of school fees up to ten shillings per head, making primary education effectively free.

The Elementary Education (School Attendance) Act 1893 (56 & 57 Vict. c. 51) raised the school leaving age to 11. The Elementary Education (Blind and Deaf Children) Act 1893 (56 & 57 Vict. c. 42) extended compulsory education to blind and deaf children, and made provision for the creation of special schools.

The Voluntary Schools Act 1897 (60 & 61 Vict. c. 5) provided grants to public elementary schools not funded by school boards (typically Church schools).

Another act, the Elementary Education (School Attendance) Act (1893) Amendment Act 1899 (62 & 63 Vict. c. 13), raised the school leaving age to 12.

In 1894, the Government set up a Royal Commission on Secondary Education in England, known as the Bryce Commission after its Chair, Lord Bryce, whose recommendations led to the Board of Education Act 1899.

=== Funding of technical colleges ===
The Technical Instruction Act 1889 was passed. According to D. Evans, "It gave powers to the County Councils and the Urban Sanitary Authorities to levy a penny tax to support technical and manual instruction. The curricula in technical institutions also had to be approved by the Science and Art Department. In the following year the Local Taxation Act introduced the 'whiskey tax', which made extra money available for technical instruction."

From April 1900 higher elementary schools were recognised, providing education from the age of 10 to 15.

== Balfour and local education authorities (1902–1944) ==
=== Education Act 1902 ===
The controversial Conservative Education Act 1902 (2 Edw. 7. c. 42) (or 'Balfour Act') made radical changes to the entire educational system of England and Wales. It weakened the divide between schools run by the 2,568 school boards and the 14,000 church schools, administered primarily by the Church of England, which educated about a third of children. Local education authorities were established, which were able to set local tax rates, and the school boards were disbanded. Funds were provided for denominational religious instruction in voluntary elementary schools, owned primarily by the Church of England and Roman Catholics. The law was extended in 1903 to cover London.

G. R. Searle, like nearly all historians, argues the act was a short-term political disaster for the Conservative Party because it outraged Methodists, Baptists and other nonconformists. It subsidised the two religions they rejected, Anglican and Catholic. However Searle argues it was a long-term success. The Church schools now had some financing from local ratepayers and had to meet uniform standards. It led to a rapid growth of secondary schools, with over 1000 opening by 1914, including 349 for girls. Eventually (in 1944), the Anglican schools were effectively nationalised. Grammar schools also became funded by the LEA. The act was of particular significance as it allowed for all schools, including denominational schools, to be funded through rates (local taxation), and ended the role of locally elected school boards that often attracted women, non-conformists and labour union men. The Liberals came to power in 1906, but their attempt to repeal the act was blocked by the House of Lords, setting up a major constitutional confrontation.

In the long run the Nonconformist schools practically vanished. In 1902 the Methodists operated 738 schools, but these rapidly declined throughout the 20th century. Only 28 remained in 1996.

=== Education Act 1918 ===
The Fisher Education Act 1918 (8 & 9 Geo. 5. c. 39) made secondary education compulsory up to age 14 and gave responsibility for secondary schools to the state. Under the act, many higher elementary schools and endowed grammar schools sought to become state funded central schools or secondary schools. However, most children attended elementary (primary, in modern parlance) school until age 14, rather than going to a separate school for secondary education. The act was also known as the "Fisher Act" as it was devised by H. A. L. Fisher. Starting in 1921 it enforced compulsory education from 5–14 years, but also included provision for compulsory part-time education for all 14- to 18-year-olds. This was dropped because of the cuts in public spending after World War I. This is the first act which started planning provisions for young people to remain in education until the age of 18.

After the passing of the Local Government Act 1929 (19 & 20 Geo. 5. c. 17), Poor Law schools became state funded elementary schools. The concept of junior technical schools was introduced in the 1930s to provide vocational education at secondary level, but few were ever opened.

=== Spens and Norwood reports ===
In 1937 historian G. A. N. Lowndes identified a "Silent Social Revolution" in England and Wales since 1895 that could be credited to the expansion of public education:

The contribution which a sound and universal system of public education can make to the sobriety, orderliness and stability of a population is perhaps the most patent of its benefits. What other gains can be placed to its credit?...Can it be claimed that the widening of educational opportunity in the long run repays that cost to the community by a commensurate increase in the national wealth and prosperity? Or can it be claimed that it is making the population happier, better able to utilise its leisure, more adaptable? Anyone who knows how the schools have come to life in the past decade, anyone who is in a position to take a wide view of the social condition of the people and compare conditions to-day with those forty years ago, will have no hesitation in answering these questions in the affirmative.

A report of 1938 of a committee chaired by Will Spens, a former Vice-Chancellor of the University of Cambridge, recommended that entry to schools would be based on intelligence testing. This was followed by the Norwood Report of 1943 which advocated the "tripartite system" of secondary education which was introduced in the late 1940s.

== Butler's Education Act and the tripartite system (1944–1965) ==
The Education Act 1944 was an answer to surging social and educational demands created by the war and the widespread demands for social reform. It only covered England and Wales, and was drafted by Conservative Rab Butler. Known as "the Butler Act", it defined the modern split between primary education and secondary education at age 11.

The Butler Act was also a historic compromise between church and state. Three new categories of schools were created. The first were voluntary controlled schools whose costs were met by the state, and would be controlled by the local education authority. The school kept the title deeds to the land, but taught an agreed religious education syllabus. These schools were favoured by the Anglicans: over half their schools chose this status, and were soon effectively absorbed into the state system. The second were voluntary aided schools, which retained greater influence over school admission policies, staffing and curriculum, and which were preferred by the Roman Catholics and by some Anglican schools. They would have all of their running costs met by the state, but their capital costs would only be 50% state funded (later increased to 75% by the Education Act 1959, and now 90%). The third were direct grant schools – former independent schools, often town grammar schools and predominantly in the north of England, who accepted a state grant in return for providing free education to many students but still charging for others. The state had little control on syllabus or admissions policy. The schools kept their title deeds. The elite system of public schools was practically unchanged. Butler assembled a committee which produced the Fleming Report of July 1944, recommending that places at public schools be made available to state-funded scholarships, but its recommendations were not implemented.

The school leaving age was raised to 15 under the Butler Act, with an aspiration to raise it in time to 16, although this did not take place until the early 1970s (see below). The act also recommended compulsory part-time education for all young people until the age of 18, but this provision was dropped so as not to overburden the post-war spending budget (as had happened similarly with the 1918 act).

Changes in government approaches towards education meant that it was no longer regarded adequate for a child to leave education aged 14, as that is the age when they were seen to really understand and appreciate the value of education, as well as being the period when adolescence was at its height. It was beginning to be seen as the worst age for a sudden switch from education to employment, with the additional year in schooling to only provide benefits for the children when they leave. Although there were concerns about the effects of having less labour from these children, it was hoped that the outcome of a larger quantity of more qualified, skilled workers would eliminate the deficit problem from the loss of unskilled labour.

The Education Act 1944 took effect in 1947 when the Labour Party was in power and it adopted the tripartite system, consisting of grammar schools, secondary modern schools and secondary technical schools. It rejected the comprehensive school proposals favoured by a few in the Labour Party as more equalitarian. Under the tripartite model, students who passed an exam were able to attend a prestigious grammar school. Those who did not pass the selection test attended secondary modern schools or technical schools.

The new law was widely praised by Conservatives because it honoured religion and social hierarchy, by Labour because it opened new opportunities for the working class, and by the general public because it ended the fees they had to pay. The act became a permanent part of the Post-war consensus supported by the three major parties.

However, selection of academical gifted children to attend grammar school became increasingly controversial in the 1960s. Critics on the left attacked grammar schools as elitist because a student had to pass a test at age 11 to get in. Defenders argued that grammar schools allow pupils to obtain a good education through merit rather than through family income. No changes were made. In some areas, notably that of the London County Council, comprehensive schools had been introduced. They had no entrance test and were open to all children living in the school catchment area. However, despite tentative support for 'multilateralism' in secondaries, and a desire to raise the standard of secondary moderns to that of private institutions, from Minister for Education Ellen Wilkinson, the majority of Labour MPs were more concerned with implementing the 1944 act; her successor George Tomlinson saw this through, although the secondary technicals remained underdeveloped.

== Circular 10/65 and comprehensive education (1965–1979) ==
In 1965 the Labour government required all local education authorities (LEAs) to formulate proposals to move away from selection at eleven, replacing the tripartite system with comprehensive schools. This was done by the minister Tony Crosland by means of Circular 10/65 and withholding funding from any school that sought to retain selection. This circular was vehemently opposed by the grammar school lobby. Some counties procrastinated and retained the tripartite system in all but a few experimental areas. Those authorities have locally administered selection tests.

The circular also requested consultation between LEAs and the partially state-funded direct grant grammar schools on their participation in a comprehensive system, but little movement occurred. The 1970 report of the Public Schools Commission chaired by David Donnison recommended that the schools choose between becoming voluntary aided comprehensives and full independence. This was finally put into effect by the Direct Grant Grammar Schools (Cessation of Grant) Regulations 1975 (SI 1975/1198). Some schools (almost all Catholic) became fully state-funded, while the majority became independent fee-paying schools.

The introduction of the Education (Work Experience) Act 1973 (c. 23) allowed LEAs to organise work experience for the additional final year school students.

In some counties around the country, these changes also led to the introduction of middle schools in 1968, where students were kept at primary or junior school for an additional year, meaning that the number of students in secondary schools within these areas remained virtually constant through the change. As of 2007, there are now fewer than 400 middle schools across England, situated in just 22 Local Education Authorities.

=== Raising of school leaving age (ROSLA) ===
In 1964, preparations had begun to raise the school leaving age to 16 to be enforced from 1 September 1973 onwards. This increased the legal leaving age from 15 to 16 and for one year, 1973, there were no 15-year-old school leavers as the students, by law, had to complete an additional year of education.

Many secondary schools were unable to accommodate the new 5th year students. The solution to the problem was to construct new buildings (often referred to as "ROSLA buildings" or "ROSLA blocks") for the schools that needed to extend their capacity. This provided the space to cope with the new cohort of ROSLA students. The ROSLA buildings were delivered to schools in self assembly packs and were not intended to stand long-term, though some have proven to have stood much longer than was initially planned and were still in use in the 2010s.

=== Primary schools ===
The 1967 Plowden Report advocated a more child-centred approach to primary education, and also supported the introduction of middle schools. While many of the report's recommendations were never implemented, primary schools began to move away from rote learning in the late 1960s and 1970s.

=== Apprenticeships ===
High technology industry (aerospace, nuclear, oil and gas, automotive, power generation and distribution etc.) trained its professional engineers via the advanced apprenticeship system of learning – usually a 5-year process. The higher apprenticeship framework in the 1950s, 60s and 70s was designed to allow young people (16 years) an alternative path to A levels to achieve an academic qualification at level 4 or 5 NVQ (National Vocational Qualification). The Higher Apprenticeship Framework was open to young people who had a minimum of four GCE "O" levels to enrol in an Ordinary National Certificate or Diploma or a City & Guilds technician course. For advanced engineering apprenticeships "O" levels had to include mathematics, physics, and English language. The advanced apprenticeship framework's purpose was to provide a supply of young people seeking to enter work-based learning via apprenticeships by offering structured high value learning and transferable skills and knowledge. These apprenticeships were enabled by linking industry with local technical colleges and professional Engineering Institutions.

The Advanced Apprenticeship Framework offered clear pathways and outcomes that addressed the issues facing the industry. This system was in place since the 1950s. The system provided young people with an alternative to staying in full-time education beyond 16/18 to gain pure academic qualifications without work-based learning. The Advanced Apprenticeships of the 1950s, 60s and 70s provided the necessary preparation towards Engineering Technician, Technician Engineer or Chartered Engineer registration. Apprentices undertook a variety of job roles in numerous technical functions to assist the work of engineers, in the design, development, manufacture and maintenance of production system.

Industry Training Boards (ITBs) were introduced by the Industrial Training Act 1964 (amended by the Agricultural Training Board Act 1982 and Industrial Training Act 1982), requiring employers in a number of sectors to pay a training levy to their industry training board or apply a similar sum to the provision of training to their employees. Later phased out, as of 2018 the Construction Industry Training Board survives.

In modern times, apprenticeship became less important, especially as employment in heavy industry and artisan trades has declined since the 1980s. Traditional apprenticeships reached their lowest point in the 1980s: by that time, training programmes were rare and people who were apprentices learned mainly by example.

== Conservative governments (1979–1997) ==
Following the 1979 General Election, the Conservative Party regained power under Margaret Thatcher. In the early period it made two main changes:

1. New Vocationalism was expanded (Labour had made some small efforts beforehand, but the Conservatives expanded it considerably). This was seen as an effort to reduce the high youth unemployment, which was regarded as one of the causes of the sporadic rioting at the end of the seventies. The Youth Opportunities Programme was the main scheme, offered to 16- to 18-year-olds. It had been introduced in 1978 under the Labour government of James Callaghan, was expanded in 1980 under the Conservative government of Margaret Thatcher, and ran until 1983 when it was replaced by the Youth Training Scheme.
2. The Assisted Places Scheme was introduced in 1980, whereby gifted children who could not afford to go to fee-paying schools would be given free places in those schools if they could pass the school's entrance exam.

In 1986, National Vocational Qualifications (NVQs) were introduced, in an attempt to revitalise vocational training. Still, by 1990, apprenticeship took up only two-thirds of one per cent of total employment.

=== Education Reform Act 1988 ===
The Education Reform Act 1988 made considerable changes to the education system. These changes were aimed at creating a 'market' in education with schools competing with each other for 'customers' (pupils). The theory was that "bad" schools would lose pupils to the "good" schools and either have to improve, reduce in capacity or close.

The reforms included the following:

- The National Curriculum was introduced, which made it compulsory for schools to teach certain subjects and syllabuses. Previously the choice of subjects had been up to the school.
- National curriculum assessments were introduced at the Key Stages 1 to 4 (ages 7, 11, 14 and 16 respectively) through what were formerly called Standard Assessment Tests (SATS). At Key Stage 4 (age 16), the assessments were made from the GCSE exam.
- Formula funding was introduced, which meant that the more children a school could attract to it, the more money the school would receive.
- Open enrolment and choice for parents was brought back, so that parents could choose or influence which school their children went to.
- Schools could, if enough of their pupils' parents agreed, opt out of local government control, becoming grant maintained schools and receiving funding direct from central government. The government offered more money than the school would get usually from the local authority as an enticement. This was seen as a politically motivated move since the Conservative central government was taking control from local authorities which were often run by other parties.
- Religious education was reformed; Chapter 1 of the law required that the majority of collective worship be "wholly or mainly of a broadly Christian character".

=== Apprenticeship reform ===
In 1994, the government introduced Modern Apprenticeships (since renamed 'Apprenticeships'), based on frameworks devised by Sector Skills Councils. These frameworks contain a number of separately certified elements:

- a knowledge-based element, typically certified through a qualification known as a 'Technical Certificate';
- a competence-based element, typically certified through an NVQ; and
- Key Skills (literacy and numeracy).

=== Education Act 1996 ===
Between 1976 and 1997, the minimum school leaving arrangements were:

- A child whose sixteenth birthday falls in the period 1 September to 31 January inclusive, may leave compulsory schooling at the end of the Spring term (the following Easter).
- A child whose sixteenth birthday falls in the period 1 February to 31 August, may leave on the Friday before the last Monday in May.

Under section 8(4) of the Education Act 1996, a new single school leaving date was set for 1998 and all subsequent years thereafter. This was set as the last Friday in June in the school year which the child reaches the age of 16.

Under section 7 of the act, it was made an obligation for parents to ensure a full-time education for their children either at school or "otherwise" which formalised the status of home education.

== New Labour (1997–2010) ==
New Labour adopted an "Education, Education, Education" slogan in the mid-1990s, but maintained many of the Conservative changes after returning to power after the 1997 general election. The following changes did take place, however:

- The previous Labour focus on the comprehensive system was shifted to a focus on tailoring education to each child's ability. Critics see this as reminiscent of the original intentions of the tripartite system.
- Grant-maintained status was abolished, with GM schools being given the choice of rejoining the local authority as a maintained community school, or becoming a foundation school.

Although the government-run eleven-plus exam selection exam for all children had now been abolished, voluntary selection tests continue in certain areas, where some of the original grammar schools have been retained. These areas include: Northern Ireland and some English counties and districts including Devon, Dorset, Kent, Buckinghamshire, Essex, Birmingham, Trafford, Wiltshire, North Yorkshire, Calderdale, Kirklees, Wirral, Warwickshire, Gloucestershire, Lincolnshire and some London boroughs such as Bexley, Kingston-upon-Thames and Redbridge. There have been various (so far unsuccessful) attempts by campaigners to abolish all remaining grammar schools. The remaining grammar schools are now thus still selective, typically taking the top 10-25% of those from the local catchment area. Some of the still-existing grammar schools in the United Kingdom can trace their history back to earlier than the sixteenth century.

- Labour expanded a policy started by the Conservatives of creating specialist schools via the specialist schools programme. This new type of secondary school teaches the National Curriculum subjects plus a few specialist branches of knowledge (e.g. business studies) not found in most other schools. These schools are allowed to select 10% of their pupils.
  - Numbers: In 1997 there were 196 of these schools. In August 2002 there were 1,000. By 2006 the plan was to have 2,000, and the goal was to make all secondary schools specialist eventually.
- The Beacon Schools programme was established in England in 1998. Its aim was to identify high performing schools, in order to help them form partnerships with each other and to provide examples of effective practice for other schools. The programme was replaced in August 2005 with more broadly based programmes; the Leading Edge Partnership programme (for secondary schools) and Primary Strategy Learning Networks (PSLNs) (at the primary level).
- A new grade of Advanced Skills Teacher was created, with the intention that highly skilled teachers would be paid more if they accepted new posts with outreach duties beyond their own schools.
- City Academies were introduced. These are new schools, built on the site of, or taking over from existing failing schools. A city academy is an independent school within the state system. It is outside the control of the local education authority and set up with substantial funding from interested third parties, which might be businesses, charities or private individuals.
- Education Action Zones were introduced, which are deprived areas run by an action forum of people within that area with the intention of making that area's schools better.
- Vocational qualifications were renamed/restructured as follows:
  - GNVQs became Vocational GCSEs and AVCEs.
  - NVQs scope expanded so that a degree-equivalent NVQ was possible.
- The New Deal was introduced, which made advisors available to long-term unemployed (in the UK this is defined as being unemployed for more than 6 months) to give help and money to those who want to go back into Education.
- Introduced Literacy and Numeracy Hours into schools, and set targets for literacy and numeracy.
- Set Truancy targets.
- Set a maximum class size of 30 for 5-7 year olds.
- Introduced the EMA (Education Maintenance Allowance) which is paid to those between 16 and 18 as an enticement to remain in full-time education and get A-Levels/AVCEs.
- A performance threshold was introduced in 2000 to allow experienced teachers access to higher rates of pay on meeting a set of performance standards, including a standard of pupil attainment. The performance-related pay changes have been bitterly opposed by teaching unions, most notably the National Union of Teachers which challenged the Threshold scheme by legal action.
- Introduced Curriculum 2000, which reformed the Further Education system into the current structure of AS levels, A2 levels and key skills.
- Abolished the Assisted Places Scheme.
- A report was commissioned, led by the former chief-inspector of schools, Mike Tomlinson, into reform of the curriculum and qualifications structure for 14- to 19-year-olds. The report was published on 18 October 2004 and recommended the introduction of a diploma that would bring together both vocational and academic qualifications and ensure that all pupils had a basic set of core skills. It is proposed that the current qualifications would evolve into this diploma over the next decade, whether the government will follow the recommendations is yet to be seen — the Conservative Party have already introduced alternative proposals to return to norm-referencing in A-levels rather than the current system of criterion-referencing.
- In 2003 a green paper entitled Every Child Matters was published. It built on existing plans to strengthen children's services and focused on four key areas:
  - Increasing the focus on supporting families and carers as the most critical influence on children's lives
  - Ensuring necessary intervention takes place before children reach crisis point and protecting children from falling through the net
  - Addressing the underlying problems identified in the report into the death of Victoria Climbié – weak accountability and poor integration
  - Ensuring that the people working with children are valued, rewarded and trained

The green paper prompted a debate about services for children, young people and families resulting in a consultation with those working in children's services, and with parents, children and young people. The Government published Every Child Matters: the Next Steps in November 2004, and passed the Children Act 2004, providing the legislative spine for developing more effective and accessible services focused around the needs of children, young people and families.

- In January 2007 Education Secretary Alan Johnson announced plans to extend the school leaving age in England to eighteen by 2013. This would raise the leaving age for the first time since 1972, when compulsory education was extended to sixteen. The changes included apprenticeships and work based training in addition to continued academic learning. This became law through the Education and Skills Act 2008, with the school leaving age raised to 17 in 2013 and 18 in 2015.

== Cameron premiership (2010–2016) ==
The Academies Act 2010, one of the first government bills introduced in the Conservative – Liberal Democrat coalition government, allowed publicly funded schools in England to become academies, still publicly funded but with a vastly increased degree of autonomy in issues such as setting teachers' wages and diverging from the National Curriculum. This also led to various mergers between schools into much larger Academies.

The Education Act 2011 made changes to many areas of educational policy, including the power of school staff to discipline students, the manner in which newly trained teachers are supervised, the regulation of qualifications, the administration of local authority maintained schools, academies, the provision of post-16 education, including vocational apprenticeships, and student finance for higher education. It abolished the General Teaching Council for England, the Qualifications and Curriculum Development Agency and the Training and Development Agency for Schools and other bodies.

In 2013 the Education and Skills Act 2008 came into force, requiring all young people in England to stay on in education or training at least part-time until they are 17 years old, with this extended to 18 years in 2015.

== Academic qualifications ==
Alongside vocational qualifications such as GNVQs and BTECs, there have been numerous examinations and qualifications in secondary education in England.

Period	Taken at age 16		Taken at age 18		
Interwar period	School Certificate			Higher School Certificate	Scholarship level – for university entrants; high performance would be rewarded by a state scholarship
Post-Butler	GCE Ordinary Level			GCE Advanced Level	Scholarship level – for university entrants; high performance would be rewarded by a state scholarship
1960s-1980s	GCE Ordinary Level	Certificate of Secondary Education exams covered both academic and vocational subjects and were an alternative to O Levels		GCE Advanced Level	In 1962 state scholarships were scrapped and the exams became known as special papers or S levels, which top A-level students could take to support their university application
1980s-2000	General Certificate of Secondary Education		Advanced Supplementary Levels were taken alongside A Levels as a standalone qualification	GCE Advanced Level	In 1962 state scholarships were scrapped and the exams became known as special papers or S levels, which top A-level students could take to support their university application
Curriculum 2000	General Certificate of Secondary Education		Advanced Subsidiary Levels formed the first year of an A Level qualification. Students who then completed the A2 year were awarded the full A Level		Advanced Extension Awards were an additional qualification for the most able A Level students
2010s reforms	New-style GCSEs were phased in between 2017 and 2019, using a numerical grading system and replacing the modular system with exams at the end of the two-year course		AS Levels became a standalone qualification as part of an overhaul of A Levels, with the modular system replaced by exams at the end of the two-year A Level course		The introduction of the A* grade for A Levels in 2010 allowed for differentiation between the top A Level students, and so all AEAs except for Mathematics were phased out

== See also ==
- List of the oldest schools in the United Kingdom
- Public school (United Kingdom), private elite schools
- Education in early modern Scotland
- History of early childhood care and education
  - Sunday school, in churches on Sundays only
  - Dame schools, for children under 6 years
  - Ragged school, for the poorest children
- History of education in the United States
  - Education in the Thirteen Colonies
