= Essential Skills Wales =

Suite of skills qualifications available in Wales

Essential Skills Wales (ESW) is a suite of skills qualifications, available in Wales. Each Essential Skills Wales qualification is equivalent to an E grade at GCE AS-Level (Three Essential Skill Wales qualifications is equivalent to a D grade at GCE A-Level). Essential Skills Wales has replaced the earlier Key Skills in Wales and Wider Key Skills schemes. Skills covered are in the areas of communication, application of number, and ICT. ESW is also embedded within Welsh educational initiatives including the Welsh Baccalaureate and the Apprenticeship programme.

== History ==
Essential Skills Wales replaced the previous Key Skills in Wales in September 2011. It replaced the previous Key Skills of Communication, Application of Number and ICT, and the Basic Skills of Adult Literacy, Adult Numeracy and Skills for Life ICT. Subsequently, Essential Skills Wales merged with Wider Key Skills to form one suite of Essential Skills qualifications at levels ranging from Entry 1 to Level 3.

Proposed changes in 2016 included a new set of ESW qualifications: Essential Communication Skills, Essential Application of Number Skills, and Essential Digital Literacy Skills.

== Description ==
Essential Skills Wales (ESW) currently consists of three different skills qualifications and is available from entry level 1 (Foundation Level) through to level 4 (Advanced Level). These skills can be achieved through the medium of Welsh or English. Four awarding bodies currently offer the qualifications: Pearson, City & Guilds, WJEC and the Welsh Open College Network, Agored Cymru.

== Assessment ==
Application of Number and Communication are assessed by a Controlled Task and Confirmatory Test. Digital Literacy and Employability are assessed by a Controlled Task and Structured Discussion. At entry level, the nature of the assessment for the qualifications will be determined by the awarding body delivering the qualification. Each level of the skills incorporates and builds on previous levels.

== ESW in the Welsh Baccalaureate ==
Essential Skills Wales is one of the four core components of the Welsh Baccalaureate qualification. ESW is intended to complement the other three components (Wales, Europe and the World; Personal and Social Education; and Work-related Education).

In 2015, 4,123 Welsh Bacc learners achieved level 3 ESW Application of Number, and 1,985 Welsh Bacc learners achieved level 3 ESW ICT.
