= History of education in Wales =

The history of education in Wales spans from the period of Roman rule to the present day. Early forms of formal education were church or privately run and available to only a small segment of the population. In the 17th and 18th centuries significant efforts were made, mainly by charitable causes, to expand access to basic education. In the 19th century a state education system developed. By the end of the century, education had become free and compulsory for children aged 5 to 12 years. Further increases in the school leaving age and the development of a system of secondary schools led by the mid-20th century to universal secondary education—separate secondary schools for students of different academic abilities ended by 1980.

Education has been conducted in English, Welsh and historically Latin. In the 19th century Welsh was often repressed by schools. In the 20th century the language gradually gained a more prominent role in the education system. In the 21st century all pupils under the age of 16 are taught Welsh as a subject, and a minority of schools use Welsh as the main language of instruction. The first university in Wales was founded in 1872, though Welsh students had previously received higher education elsewhere or in other kinds of institutions. In the late 20th century the numbers enrolling in university increased sharply. As of 2021 almost a third of people over 16 have a university-level education.

== Before 1701 ==
The Roman province of Britannia (which included modern-day Wales) is generally considered to have had relatively low levels of literacy, by the standards of the Roman Empire, and there is little record of formal education. In the period after Roman withdrawal from Great Britain literacy in what is today Wales was largely restricted to the clergy. For most people the wide range of skills and knowledge needed for the work they did was passed orally from one generation to the next. Bards played a significant role in maintaining cultural memory. Throughout much of the Middle Ages even the highest-ranking members of the lay population could often go without formal education, though this steadily changed. The vocational education of the period, seven-year apprenticeships, was controlled by the guilds. Aristocratic children could receive their education through private tuition, but those aiming for a career in the Church would usually attend grammar schools generally linked to cathedrals. These schools gave a classical education based on the trivium and the quadrivium. The impact of the Black Death and the Glyndŵr rebellion harmed the Welsh elite's prospects for education, but there was a steady expansion throughout the rest of the 15th century.

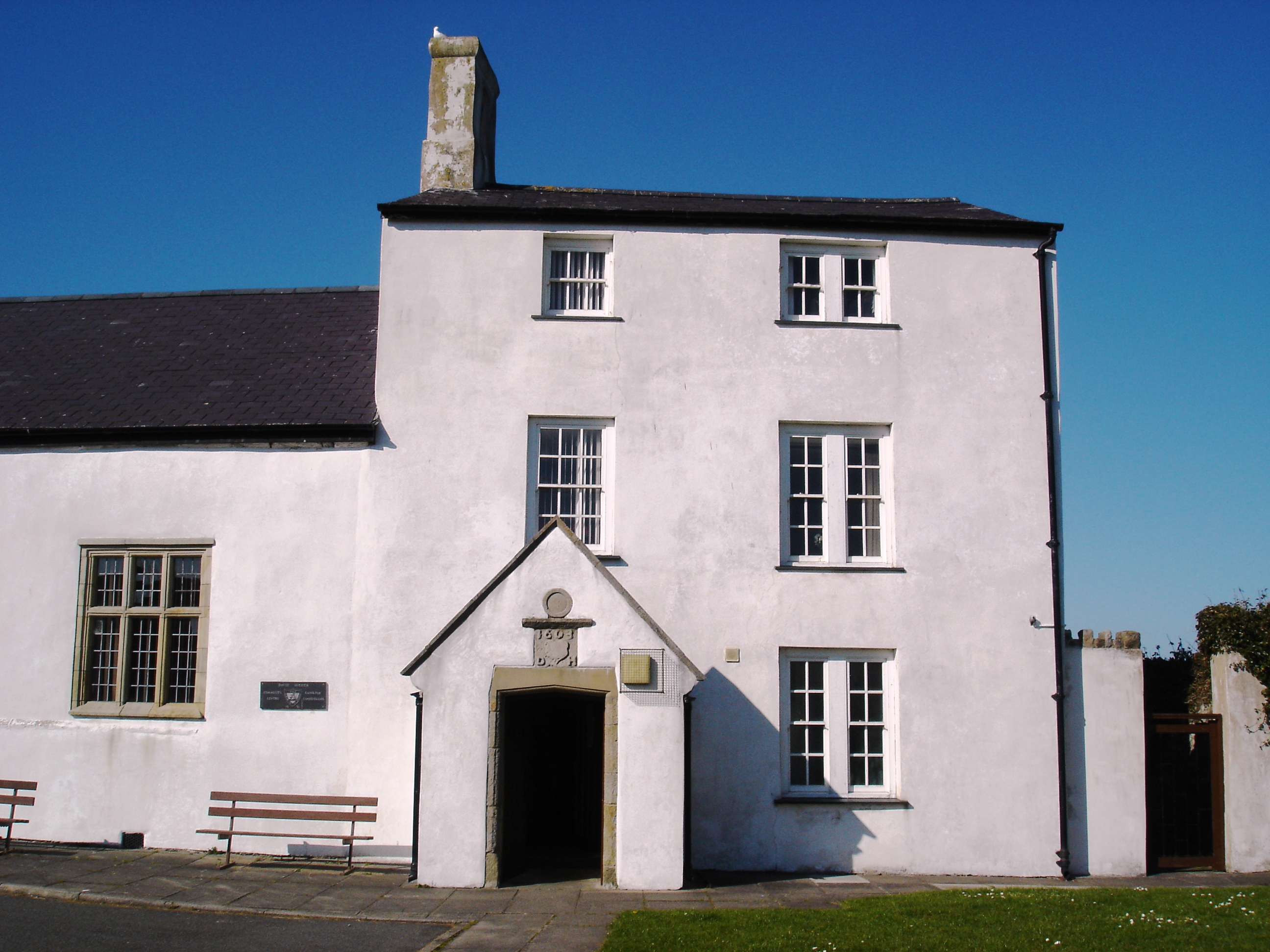
Original building of Beaumaris Grammar School on the Isle of Anglesey

In the 16th and 17th centuries, several new grammar schools were established to cater to growing demand for formal education among people in skilled occupations and commerce. Teaching was always conducted in a single room and the norm was only one schoolmaster. Schools frequently included accommodation for the master, usher (assistant teacher) and sometimes boarding pupils. The grammar schools were all boys' schools. They catered to a varied age range. The emphasis of instruction was on Latin and less often Ancient Greek. Teaching was conducted through recitation and dictation; the birch was used to punish both bad behaviour and poor academic progress. Fees were usually expected; some boys could receive scholarships that covered the cost of fees but not materials.

Alongside the grammar schools, there were a small number of schools providing elementary education. There were also a variety of other more informal ways that some children may have received some basic education. However, for the vast majority of the population in the 16th and much of the 17th century, formal education was unattainable. In the early 17th century around 20% of people in Wales were literate in Welsh or English. Historians Gareth Elwyn Jones and Gordon Wynne Roderick argue that the peasantry generally was not interested in literacy as it held little practical advantage for them. After the Reformation, the growing Puritan movement became concerned about poor levels of literacy. A 1650 Act—passed by Oliver Cromwell's government—appointed a commission that established sixty schools in Wales. These schools disappeared after the Restoration. In the early 1670s, clergyman Thomas Gouge began to preach in Wales; by 1675 he had established 87 schools which were attended by a total of 2225 children. They closed after he died in 1681. The Society for the Promotion of Christian Knowledge (SPCK) was founded in 1699 with similar aims. Little formal education was available for girls during this period; some might have attended elementary schools and others from more well-off families were tutored at home.

== 1701–1870 ==
=== 18th century ===
In the early 18th century, many charity schools were established with the support of the SPCK, but later foundings tended to be associated with the "circulating [travelling] school movement" which originated in Wales. The second group catered for both children and adults. 96 SPCK schools were established by 1714. They emphasised practical training, moral and religious education as well as practical support for poorer pupils. The circulating schools were developed by Griffith Jones, a priest in the Church of England. The schools only taught the ability to read and used temporary accommodation. Jones received donations from various patrons, many of whom were English as well as Welsh. Around half the Welsh population attended circulating schools during the middle decades of the 18th century.

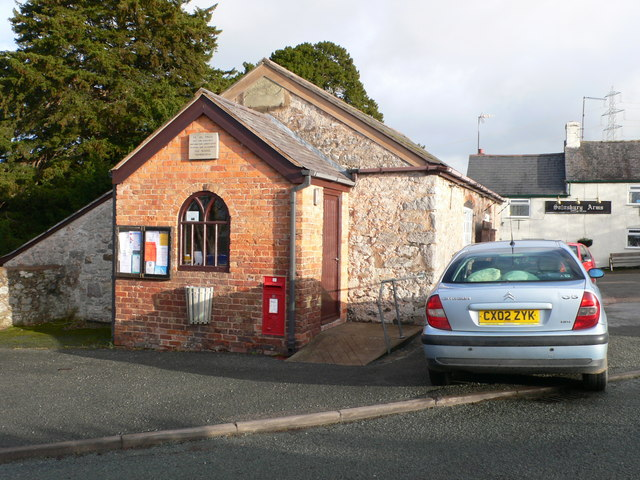
Old school building dating from 1765 in Tremeirchion now a village hall

Sunday schools developed from the 1780s onwards. Early Sunday schools tended to admit adults as well as children. In Wales, they were generally nonconformist and often associated with the Methodist revival. Welsh Sunday Schools tended to focus on religion and reading, avoiding the wider secular education sometimes taught at Sunday Schools elsewhere. 79 endowments for elementary schools in Wales were made by individuals between 1700 and 1800. A number of commercially-run schools aimed at the working classes and organised by people of the same social background also existed.

There was a certain degree of decline in grammar schools during this period. Some of them disappeared or declined into elementary schools. There was an expansion in the teaching of non-classical subjects in grammar schools, which seems to have often particularly benefited the wealthiest pupils.

=== Early to mid-19th century ===
In the early 19th century the British and Foreign School Society (which was Nonconformist) and the National Society for Promoting Religious Education (which was Anglican) were founded. These organisations began to establish "voluntary schools". The schools attempted to maximise the children taught by using the monitorial system with older, more able pupils passing on information from their teacher to the other children. Another form of elementary education available in this period were works schools run by industrialists for the education of the children of their workers. While school participation rates in the early- to mid-19th century are somewhat hard to assess, a lower proportion of the population were enrolled in day schools in Wales than in England or Scotland. Sunday schools were often used as a substitute for full-time schooling. Literacy rates were also lower.

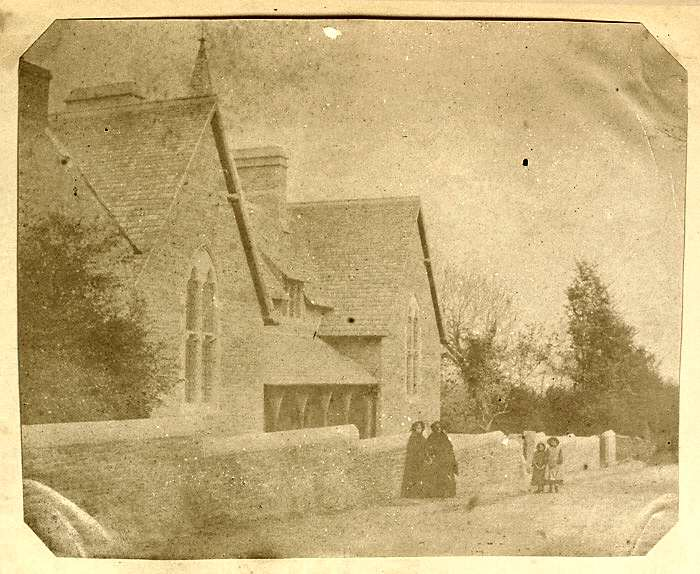
School in Sketty, Swansea photographed by Augustus Lennox (1854)

From 1833 the voluntary schools began to receive government funding. In 1839 the Committee of the Privy Council on Education (CCE) was formed which conducted state inspections of schools receiving grants in England and Wales for the first time. Early inspection reports give a mixed impression of schools in Wales. In 1847 the curriculum at day schools was often limited to reading, writing, arithmetic and religion. Some schools taught a wider range of subjects such as vocal music, grammar, drawing, geography and the history of England. The Newcastle Commission led to the introduction of the Revised Code of 1862. The code introduced a system of payment by results, with grants given based on pupils' knowledge of the three Rs and attendance. In the 1860s there was growing political pressure in England and Wales for a significant intervention in the elementary education system. At the end of the 1860s, there were school places for 60% of school-aged children in Wales, but with significant geographical variations. In Merthyr Tydfil places were available for only 22%.

Secondary education provision during this period was very limited in Wales. In the late 1860s, 28 boys' grammar schools with combined pupil numbers of 1,100 existed in Wales. Meanwhile, girls were especially poorly catered for. Two endowed girls' schools had been established in 1860 and another was founded in 1878. There were several private secondary schools for girls and boys. Some provided good quality education, but most were mediocre.

== 1870–1939 ==
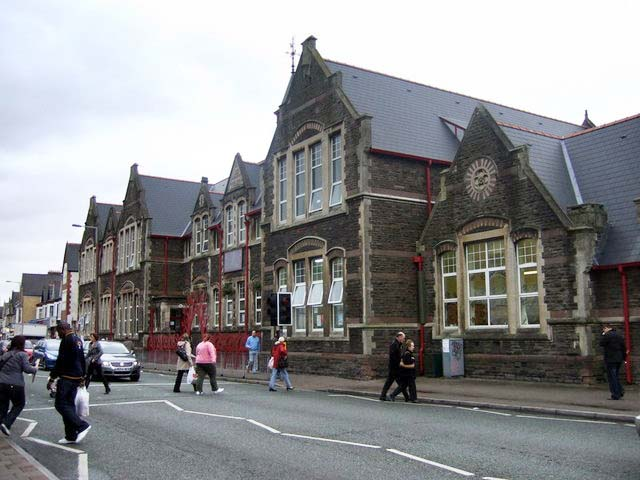
School opened as Albany Road Board School, Cardiff in 1886

The Elementary Education Act 1870 (33 & 34 Vict. c. 75) required school boards run by locally elected officials to be established in areas where there were "insufficient places in efficient voluntary schools" to run additional schools. The boards were allowed but not required to make education compulsory. A power that was extended to other districts in 1876. Compulsory education was introduced for 5- to 10-year-olds across England and Wales by the Elementary Education Act 1880 (43 & 44 Vict. c. 23). 10- to 13-year-olds could leave school once they had reached a certain level of academic performance. Attendance was made free in 1891, the minimum school leaving age was increased to 11 in 1893 and 12 in 1899. Compulsory education was also extended to children who were deaf, blind or had other physical disabilities in the 1890s.

Some school boards were very active in expanding school provision. Many new schools were built by the boards over the thirty years after their introduction; the overall number of schools more than doubled. Although certain rural school boards were described as being of low standard, sectarian and inactive. At the time of the Elementary Education Act 1870, many school buildings were of poor quality, lacking proper facilities and healthy conditions. The Education department pushed for improvements. The elementary education system in Wales during this period closely resembled that of England. Both in what it taught and how it was administered. The payment-by-results scheme encouraged an emphasis on rote learning and teaching to the test. Although the curriculum steadily expanded with payments available to schools for results in history, geography, science, domestic science, metalwork and woodwork. Topics such as needlework and cookery were added to the curriculum for girls. Schools experienced various difficulties, but offered a basic education for almost all children.

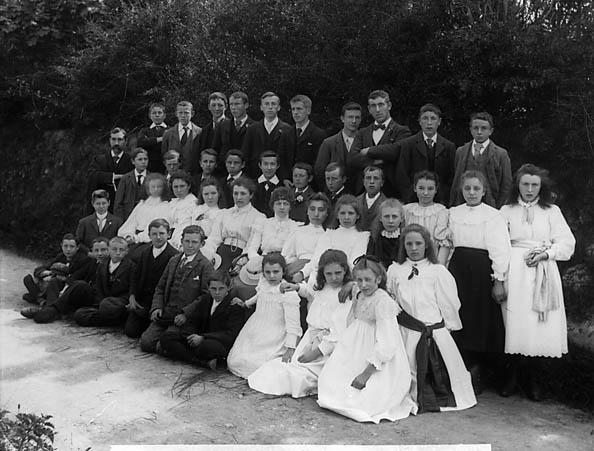
Class photo at an intermediate school in St Davids by John Thomas (1899)

The Aberdare Committee of 1881 emphasised the need for improved secondary education, especially for girls. The committee recommended the creation of two types of state funded intermediate (secondary) school, one of which would cater to children from relatively modest backgrounds. The committee led to the Welsh Intermediate Education Act 1889 (52 & 53 Vict. c. 40) predating similar legislation in England by thirteen years. By around 1900 there were 7,000 children in the intermediate schools including almost as many girls as boys. While the schools had been intended primarily for the middle classes, a significant proportion of pupils in some areas were of working-class backgrounds. The main curriculum of a majority of intermediate schools was English, Latin, mathematics, history, geography and French. Most of the headmasters adopted an ethos for the schools resembling English public schools. In 1914, young people in Wales were more likely to enter secondary school or university than anywhere else in Western Europe other than Scotland. Meanwhile, the period saw a growth in evening classes teaching vocational subjects.

The payment-by-results system ended in the middle of the 1890s. This led to a gradual move away from rote learning to a wider curriculum and more varied teaching methods. However, elementary schools were still widely understood to be mainly institutions providing a fairly low level of education to those destined for lives of manual labour. The Education Act 1902 (2 Edw. 7 c. 42) was deeply opposed by nonconformists because it restructured school financing in a way that meant ratepayers would be paying directly for the upkeep of Anglican and Roman Catholic schools. This led to a political crisis in Wales, with most local authorities refusing to apply the law. In 1907 the Welsh department was established within the Board of Education. Over subsequent years, efforts were made to introduce more of a Welsh emphasis into the curriculum.

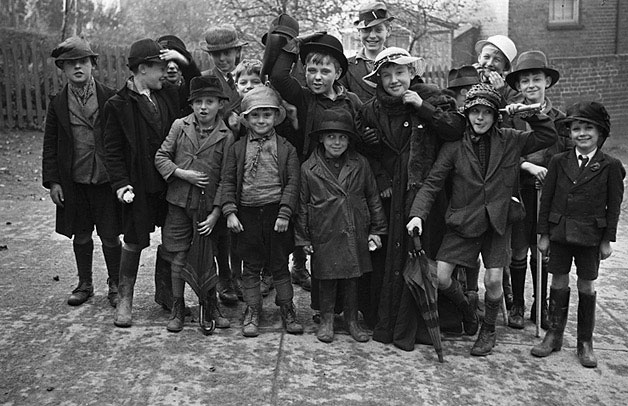
Boys of Newtown Church School after a rummage sale photographed by Geoff Charles (1939)

The First World War had a fairly limited immediate impact on education in Wales. Some school buildings were requisitioned for military use and a shortage of male teachers had a particular effect on secondary schools. A suspension of new school buildings led to an increase in class sizes, especially in secondary schools. The Education Act 1918 (8 & 9 Geo. 5. c. 39) increased the minimum school leaving age to fourteen. Other provisions included some financial changes which benefited the education system, and the creation of central schools. Around the time of WWI the subjects listed on inspection reports as being taught at elementary schools included "English, Arithmetic, history and geography, music and drawing". Practical subjects might also be included, such as "needlework, laundry, handicraft, hygiene and school gardens". The curriculum became broader over time. By 1931 19% of elementary school pupils in Wales transitioned to secondary school at the age of about 11 years old while the rest remained at elementary school until the age of fourteen. However high rates of early dropout from secondary school were an ongoing issue.

== 1939 to present ==
=== Second World War and aftermath ===
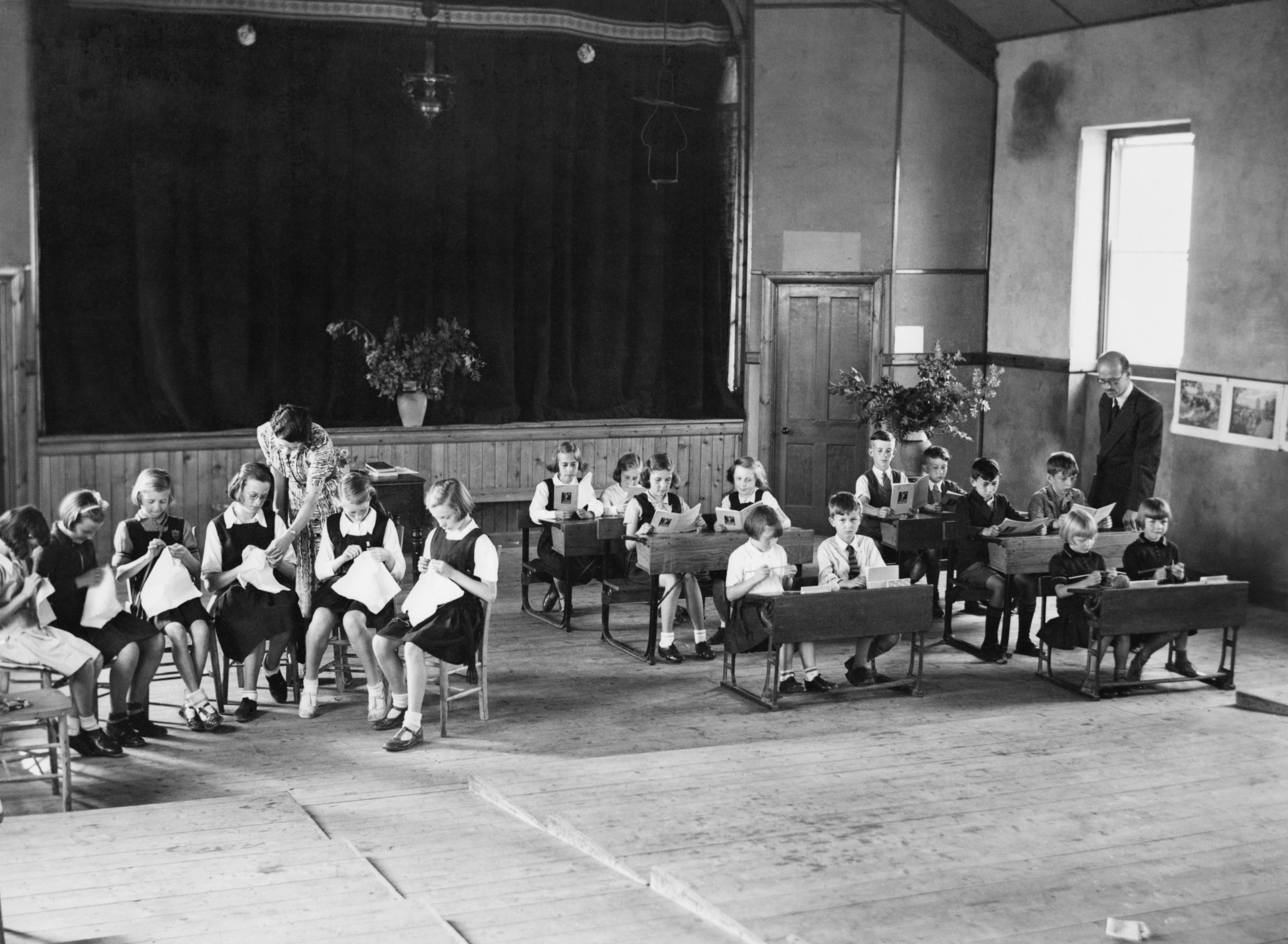
Child evacuees from London receive their school lessons in a village hall in Ffarmers, Carmarthenshire (1940)

The evacuation scheme during the Second World War led to overcrowding in the education system. This was heightened by a suspension of new school building and a significant shortage of staff. Local authorities reached solutions such as using village halls as schools and rotating part-time classes. Some school buildings were lost due to air raids in Cardiff and Swansea. At schools free milk was provided and at a time of food shortages the number of children using free school meals increased significantly. In July 1943 the government published a reform proposal called Education Reconstruction. This document proposed a universal split between primary and secondary school at age 11. Meanwhile, Cyril Norwood wrote a report arguing that every child was naturally suited to one of three types of schools: grammar, modern or technical. The government proposals led to the Education Act 1944 (7 & 8 Geo. 6. c. 31).

The Education Act 1944 largely put the 1943 proposal into law. The school leaving age was increased to 15 in 1947. The 1944 act did not say what variety of school types should be created, but most local authorities chose the types recommended by Norwood. However very few of the technical schools were opened. Equal status between different school types was also not established. Bilateral schools which provided a segregated system within a single school were sometimes used in rural areas. Primary education was offered in infant and junior schools, separate departments or a primary school that combined the infant and junior phases. There was often an emphasis on preparation for the eleven-plus in junior schools. Primary school inspection reports often criticised insufficient focus on Welsh topics in lessons.

=== Later 20th-century development ===
With the new economic prosperity starting in the late 1950s, much more money began to be spent on education. There was a general sense of optimism about education and a feeling that it could induce progress. However, there continued to be shortages of teachers and the number of pupils staying at school after the minimum leaving age increased but remained relatively low. By 1965 there were 102,000 students in adult education in Wales and 65,946 in vocational further education in 50 colleges; the expansion continued in the 1970s.

After a change in government in 1964 it became the central government's policy to push local authorities towards switching to comprehensive schools. By 1980, all local authorities in Wales had moved to that system. The new system was fairly consistent in being made up of large comprehensive schools for pupils aged 11 to 18 years old. In 1972 the school leaving age was increased to 16. Pupils' results at 16 and above were consistently poorer than in England. In 1980 about one in four young people in Wales left school without any qualifications. Girls tended to get poorer results than boys in the early 1970s. In 1975, the practice of teaching a differing curriculum based on sex was prohibited. By the early 1990s, girls were generally outperforming boys in their results.

Primary schools in the 1960s were influenced by the trend away from the 11-plus examination. In 1968 the Gittins Report (essentially a Welsh version of the Plowden Report) into pre-secondary education was published. It recommended the use of a wider range of teaching methods in primary schools, with the focus of education being on the development of skills, understanding and the enhancement of child development. The Plowden Report had similar ideas, and a new ethos developed in primary education. However, while some new methods were being experimented with, the method of teaching at primary schools in Wales did not change dramatically overall. The Aberfan disaster destroyed a village junior school in 1966, killing 116 children.

In 1970 responsibility for primary and secondary education in Wales was transferred to the Welsh Office, a department of the UK government. The government of the 1980s made various changes to the administration of and requirements placed on schools. The Education Reform Act 1988 established a national curriculum in England and Wales. Previously, schools, and to a large extent individual teachers, had a great deal of autonomy over what they taught, leading to inconsistent standards. The overall structure of the curriculum was the same in Wales as in England, but there were some different instructions about certain subjects in Wales. The Curriculum Cymreig (Welsh curriculum) was introduced in the 1990s to add an emphasis on Wales-related topics into the curriculum. However a report produced by Estyn in 2001 suggested that the success of this endeavour had been quite limited.

=== Devolution era ===
Education was one of the policy areas placed under the new National Assembly for Wales's control in 1999. Policies introduced during the first decade after devolution included the foundation phase (a play-based curriculum for young children), the Welsh Baccalaureate, the end of standardised testing for children in their middle years at school and an end to public comparisons between school's results. In the early 2010s, standardised testing was reintroduced in literacy and numeracy, schools were put into groups based on performance and regional consortia were given more power to push improvement. The mid-2010s saw a gradual move away from this approach.

A new curriculum which was designed to include more emphasis on skills, experiences and areas such as "digital skills, adaptability and creativity" as well as knowledge was introduced in 2022. It groups education into six "Areas of Learning and Experience", intended to help teachers draw links between subjects and teach topics in a broad way, though traditional subjects are still taught. Within a basic framework of goals and learning areas, it gives schools the freedom to develop their own curriculum to suit the needs of their pupils. Schools were closed for periods of 2020 and 2021 due to the COVID-19 pandemic. In the 2022 PISA tests Wales' scores fell more sharply than the average across participating countries in reading and science

== Language usage ==
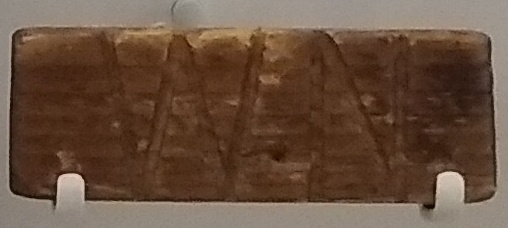
A Welsh Not, formerly used to discourage students from speaking Welsh at school

Latin usually featured in the education of the social elite before the 19th century, English often also played a significant role in schooling. Welsh frequently featured prominently in 18th century philanthropic education. The day schools created by the voluntary societies in the early 19th century were usually conducted in English. This reflected the desire within Welsh society for children to learn English. Children were often punished for speaking Welsh at school. In 1847, a report was published into education in Wales which—though some modern historians have defended its quality—was badly received in Wales at the time because of a derogatory tone. The report depicts the Welsh language as a negative influence limiting the potential of the Welsh population. The report argued that much of the Welsh-speaking public was keen to learn English and that bilingualism in schools was the best way to teach it. The government never prohibited the use of Welsh in schools. Teachers gradually began to make more informal use of Welsh, to help Welsh-speaking children learn English.

Between 1889 and 1893, a series of changes were made to government policy; teachers in Welsh speaking areas were now encouraged to teach English through Welsh and schools could benefit financially from teaching Welsh as a subject. In 1899 to 1900 only 0.8 percent of pupils were taught Welsh as a subject. From 1907 to 1920 educationalist Owen Edwards was in charge of the newly created Welsh Department of the Board of Education. He was in favour of increased use of Welsh in schools. The youth organisation Urdd Gobaith Cymru (Welsh League of Hope) was established in 1922 to develop an affection for the Welsh language and aspects of Welsh culture in young people. After five years the organisation had 5,000 members. The 1927 government report Welsh in Education and Life found that Welsh was, in Welsh-speaking areas, the main language of instruction in infant schools and was often taught as a subject up to the age of 11. It was sometimes also taught as a second language in elementary schools in English-speaking areas. Meanwhile, the report also noted that a majority of intermediate schools were offering Welsh as a subject but it was not a language of instruction.

In 1939 the first Welsh-medium primary school was established independently of the state by the Urdd in Aberystwyth. While the Education Act 1944 does not mention the Welsh language, parts of the act became a legal basis for Welsh-medium schools. The first state school of this type was opened in Llanelli in 1947. The number of Welsh-medium primary schools in predominantly Welsh-speaking areas steadily expanded over the following years. By 1970 there were 41 Welsh medium primary schools with about 5,000 pupils. The first bilingual and Welsh medium secondary schools were founded in 1956 and 1962 respectively. In the 1970s and 1980s, a growing number of Welsh medium and bilingual schools were opened in predominantly English-speaking urban areas. The inspectorate also encouraged their establishment in Welsh-speaking rural areas where the language was declining. In the 1970s and 1980s a significant minority of primary schools did not teach any Welsh. A slight majority of secondary school students were not studying Welsh in the early 1980s. Welsh became compulsory for pupils up to the age of 14 in 1990 and 16 in 1999. In 1995 there were more than 50,000 pupils in Welsh-medium primary education. In 2016 16% of pupils attended Welsh-medium schools while 10% attended bilingual schools or those with different language departments.

== Higher education ==
=== Before universities in Wales ===
In the medieval period, a small number of Welshmen began to attend universities outside of Wales. The earliest option was the University of Bologna in modern Italy and some are known to have attended the University of Paris. The University of Oxford and the University of Cambridge were founded in the 12th and 13th centuries respectively. Between 1200 and 1500, about 400 Welshmen were registered as attending the University of Oxford and 40 were registered at the University of Cambridge, but there may have been others who attended but did not register. A number also attended continental universities or trained in the Inns of Court. In the 16th century there was an increased interest in attending university. Historian W. P. Griffith estimated that 200 Welsh students attended the University of Oxford in the first 40 years of the century. He also estimated that 3,000 attended the University of Oxford, University of Cambridge or Inns of Court in the hundred years after 1540. Poor men could gain admission by acting as servants in university colleges in exchange for the removal of fees and some financial support. Welshmen remained under-represented in higher education as a proportion of the English and Welsh population. In the medieval period the most common area of study was Canon and Civil Law but this gradually changed in the 16th century to a Bachelor of Arts. About 50% of students graduated. The curriculum was similar to that of medieval grammar schools.

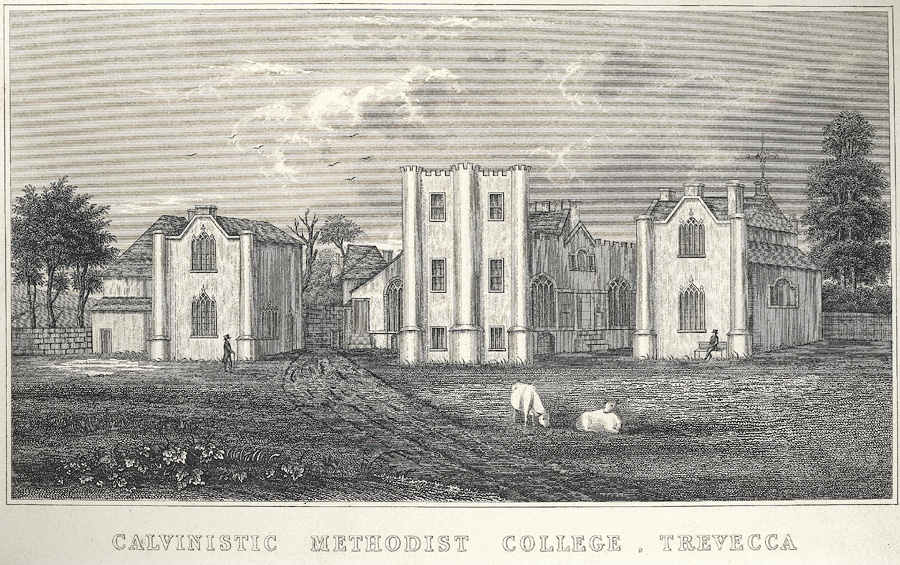
Engraving of a Calvinist Methodist college, Trefeca (1860)

A new form of senior-level education was established in the 18th century. 23 dissenter academies were established across England and Wales, initially for men who had been stopped from going to university by religious repression. They taught a variety of subjects over four years of study including "classics, logic, Hebrew, mathematics, natural sciences, modern languages and medicine". The most well-known example in Wales was the Presbyterian Academy in Brynllywarch which later moved to Carmarthen. These colleges evolved into the theological colleges of the 19th century which were associated with Nonconformists. Witnesses to the Aberdare Committee in 1880 noted that many of the colleges' pupils were from the "common people" paying "little or nothing for their support". St David's College in Lampeter was founded in 1827 to educate future Anglican clergy. It was the first degree-issuing institution in Wales.

=== Early university colleges and political higher education ===
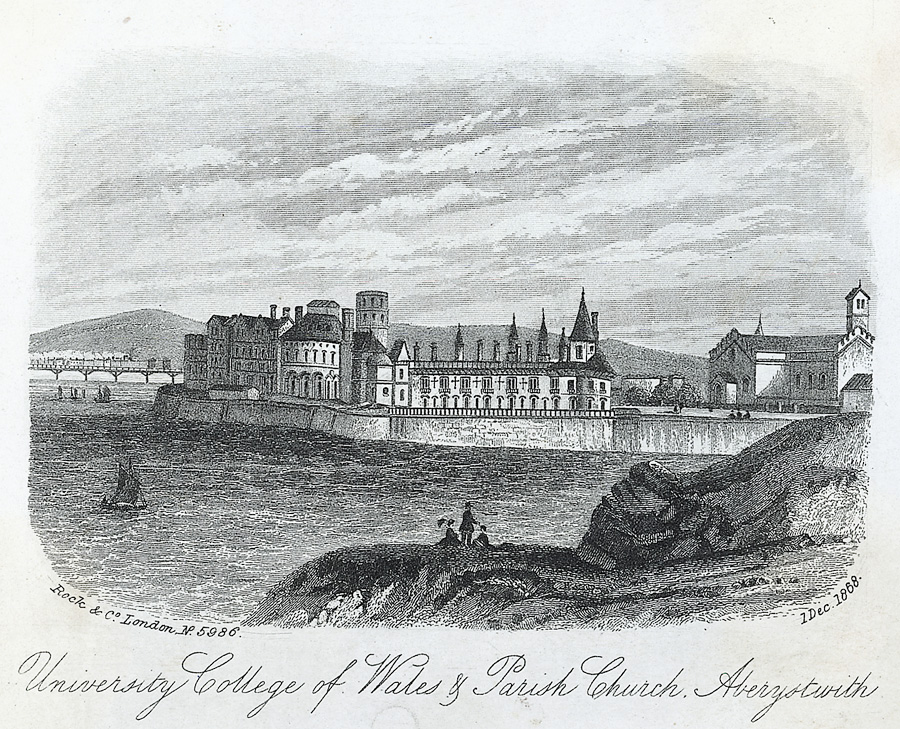
Illustration of the University College of Wales next to a parish church (1868)

In 1872 the University College of Wales, Aberystwyth was opened. The students were often ill-prepared for university. In 1880 the Aberdare Committee recommended the creation of two university colleges in North and South Wales funded by the government. The University College of South Wales and Monmouthshire, Cardiff and University College in North Wales, Bangor were created with government funding in 1883. The original university college gained its own grant in 1886. By the mid-1880s, women were being accommodated in the three university colleges in a segregated manner. Initially the colleges were affiliated with the University of London. In 1893 the University of Wales was established as an overarching university for the colleges with the power to issue degrees. By 1900 the colleges were teaching a wide range of subjects relating to the arts and sciences.

The colleges of the University of Wales physically expanded in the early 20th century. While two of the colleges developed courses in agriculture funded by the state, the University College of South Wales and Monmouthshire had less success developing technical subjects. Universities were disrupted by World War I with many students volunteering. The University College of Swansea was founded in 1920 and gained a reputation for science and technology. In 1931 the Welsh National School of Medicine was founded. The economic conditions of the time prevented many of even the most academic young people from attending university. There were also other means of gaining access to higher education in the early 20th century connected to left-wing politics. These included programmes offered by the Workers' Educational Association, Coleg Harlech and the Central Labour College.

=== Higher education since World War II ===
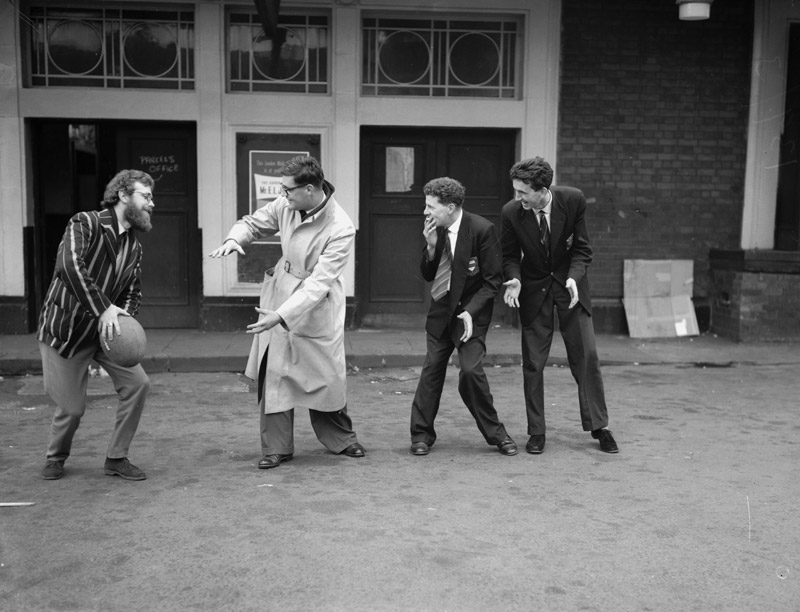
Students starting at the University College of North Wales, Bangor photographed by Geoff Charles (1958)

The Welsh university colleges experienced difficulties during World War II with staff shortages, neglected repairs, falling student numbers and shared accommodation with other institutions. The postwar period saw a rapid expansion of higher education establishments especially in the study of science and technology. In Wales the City of Cardiff Technical College became the Welsh College of Advanced Technology which itself evolved into the University of Wales Institute of Science and Technology. Meanwhile, the University of Wales also experienced the rapid increase in student numbers seen across British universities. The University of Wales saw less of an uptake in science than elsewhere. Access to university remained very limited with only 15% of the relevant age group across England and Wales reaching the necessary level of qualification for admission in 1962 and only 4% enrolling. Sex segregation was gradually relaxed at the University of Wales in the 1960s, women were much less likely to attend than men. Polytechnics were established in 1965 as a form of higher education run by local authorities. More of a focus began to be placed on attracting older adults into higher education, for instance, with the creation of the Open University in 1970.

The 1992 Further and Higher Education Act made the polytechnics into universities. Means-tested grants were replaced with student loans and tuition fees were introduced in the 1990s. In the 1990s, the number of women entering the University of Wales equalled and overtook the number of men. By 1999 almost a quarter of young people aged 19 to 24 in Wales had received a university education, a figure which continued to rise in the early 2000s. There were 13 higher education institutions, eight of which were part of the University of Wales. More than half of Welsh students studied in other parts of the UK and more than half of students in Welsh universities were from outside of Wales. In the 2021 Census 31.5% of permanent residents of Wales over the age of sixteen were recorded as having university-level qualifications.

== Bibliography ==
=== Websites, journals and news articles ===
- Clement, Mary. "GOUGE, THOMAS (1605? - 1681), Nonconformist divine and philanthropist". Dictionary of Welsh Biography.
- Collins, Sian (16 March 2017). "Society for Promoting Christian Knowledge (SPCK)". Cambridge University Library.
- Duffy, Steve (2024-02-26). "Covid inquiry: Timeline of the pandemic in Wales". BBC News.
- Greaves, Richard L. (3 January 2008). "Gouge, Thomas (1605–1681)". Oxford Dictionary of National Biography.
- Jackson, Ceri (21 October 2016). "Aberfan: The mistake that cost a village its children". BBC News.
- Jones, Megan (August 2016). "Welsh-medium education and Welsh as a subject" (PDF). National Assembly for Wales (research service). Archived (PDF) from the original on 1 June 2022.
- Lewis, Bethan (14 June 2022). "Wales schools: New lessons 'exciting but a challenge'". BBC News. Archived from the original on 2022-06-13.
- Lloyd, Amy (2007). "Education, Literacy and the Reading Public" (PDF). Gale. Archived (PDF) from the original on 5 November 2020.
- Pearce, John (2004). "Archaeology, writing tablets and literacy in Roman Britain". Gallia Préhistoire. 61: 43–51. doi:10.3406/galia.2004.3186. ISSN 0016-4119. JSTOR 43607827.
- Ratcliffe, Mike (12 April 2017). "The end of the binary divide: reflections on 25 years of the 1992 Act". Wonkhe.
- Sibieta, Luke (21 March 2024). Major challenges for education in Wales (Report). Institute for Fiscal Studies. doi:10.1920/re.ifs.2024.0303. hdl:10419/300380.

=== Books and book chapters ===
- Beardsmore, Hugo Baetens (1993). European Models of Bilingual Education. Multilingual Matters. ISBN 978-1-85359-182-2.
- Beddoe, Deirdre (2000). Out of the shadows: a history of women in twentieth-century Wales. University of Wales Press. ISBN 978-0-7083-1591-0.
- Evans, Gareth (2003). "The British State and Welsh-Language Education 1914-1991". In Evans, Geriant H. (ed.). Let's Do Our Best for the Ancient Tongue: The Welsh Language in the Twentieth Century. University of Wales Press. pp. 343–369.
- Evans, Leslie Wynne (1971). Education in Industrial Wales 1700—1900. Avalon Books. ISBN 9780902294028.
- Johnes, Martin (2024). Welsh Not: Elementary Education and the Anglicisation of Nineteenth-Century Wales (PDF). University of Wales Press. ISBN 9781837721818.
- Jones, Gareth Elwyn; Roderick, Gordon Wynne (2003). History of Education in Wales. University of Wales Press. ISBN 978-0708318089.
- Jones, Mari C (1998). Language Obsolescence and Revitalization: Linguistic Change in Two Sociolinguistically Contrasting Welsh Communities. Clarendon Press. p. 22. ISBN 0-19-961466-0.
- Keane, Ann; Egen, David; Grigg, Russell; Roy, James; Morgen, Alun; Norris, Barry; Williams, Sian Rhiannon (2022). Watchdogs or Visionaries? Perspectives on the history of the education inspectorate in Wales. University of Wales Press. ISBN 978-1786839404.
- May, Trevor (1994). The Victorian Schoolroom. Shire Publications.
- Morgan, Kenneth O. (1981). Rebirth of a Nation: Wales, 1880—1980. Oxford University Press. ISBN 978-0-19-821736-7.
- Seaborne, Malcolm (1992). Schools in Wales 1500 - 1900: a social and architectural history. Gee and Son. ISBN 978-0-7074-0222-2.
- Stephens, W. B. (1998). Education in Britain, 1750—1914. Palgrave Macmillan. ISBN 978-0-333-60512-7.
