= Qualification types in the United Kingdom =

Education qualifications

In the UK education sector, there are a wide range of qualification types offered by qualification awarding bodies in the United Kingdom. Qualifications range in size and type, can be academic, vocational or skills-related, and are grouped together into different levels of difficulty. In England, Wales and Northern Ireland, qualifications are divided into Higher Education qualifications, which are on the Framework for Higher Education Qualifications (FHEQ) and are awarded by bodies with degree awarding powers, and Regulated qualifications, which are on the Regulated Qualifications Framework (RQF) and are accredited by Ofqual in England, the Council for the Curriculum, Examinations and Assessment in Northern Ireland and Qualifications Wales in Wales. In Scotland, qualifications are divided into Higher Education qualifications, Scottish Qualifications Authority qualifications and Scottish Vocational Qualifications/Modern Apprenticeships, which are on the Scottish Credit and Qualifications Framework (SCQF). Scottish Higher Education Qualifications are on both the SCQF and the FHEQ.

== Qualification levels ==
Qualifications are grouped together into different levels. Each level corresponds to a particular qualification's degree of difficulty. However, qualifications within one level can cover a huge range of subjects and take different amounts of time to complete, often expressed in terms of credits.

In England, Northern Ireland and Wales, the levels are contained within the Regulated Qualifications Framework (RQF), which superseded the Qualifications and Credit Framework from 1 October 2015. There are nine levels of difficulty in the framework, from entry level (which is sub-divided into 3) to level 8.

Higher education qualifications are contained in the Framework for Higher Education Qualifications (FHEQ). The FHEQ corresponds with levels 4 to 8 of the RQF. Scotland has its own education system and its own twelve level system, the Scottish Credit and Qualifications Framework. These can also be equated with the European Qualifications Framework.

RQF/CQFW		FHEQ	EQF	SCQF	Example qualification
8				12	Doctoral degree
7				11	Master's degree
6				10	Bachelor's degree with honours
6				9	Non-honours bachelor's degree
5				8	Higher National Diploma
4			5	7	Higher National Certificate
3		N/A	4	6	A-level, AS Level, National Diploma
2		N/A	3	5	GCSE (grades A*–C and 4–9)
1		N/A	2	4	GCSE (grades D–F and 1–3)
Entry	E3	N/A	1	3	Skills for Life
Entry	E2	N/A	N/A	2	Skills for Life
Entry	E1	N/A	N/A	1	Skills for Life

== Business and Technology Education Council (BTEC) ==
The Business and Technology Education Council (BTEC) is a provider (existing as part of Pearson Education Ltd) of secondary school leaving qualifications and Further education qualifications in England, Wales and Northern Ireland. Whilst the T in BTEC has been mistakenly understood to stand for Technician, according to the DFE (2016) it actually stands for Technology. [1]

BTEC qualifications, especially Level 3, are accepted by many universities (excluding Cambridge and Oxford unless combined with more qualifications) when assessing the suitability of applicants for admission, and such universities may base their conditional admissions offers on a student's predicted BTEC grades.

== General National Vocational Qualification, or GNVQ ==
A General National Vocational Qualification, or GNVQ, is a certificate of vocational education in the United Kingdom. The last GNVQs were awarded in 2007.

The qualifications relate to occupational areas in general, rather than a specific job. They could be taken in a wide range of subjects. There are different levels of GNVQ, namely the Intermediate level (equivalent to four General Certificates of Secondary Education) and Advanced level (equivalent to two Advanced-level General Certificates of Education).

GNVQs were available to people of all ages. Schools and colleges offered these courses and they could be studied alongside GCSEs or A levels. The GNVQ generally involved a lot of coursework (6-8 large assignments), which allowed holders to show their skills when applying for jobs.

== AS and A levels/Highers and Advanced Highers ==
AS level and A (Advanced) level qualifications at level 3 on the RQF focus on traditional study skills. They normally take two years to complete full-time in school or college, and can be taken part-time. AS and A levels are available in a wide range of academic and applied (work-related) subjects, and are often used as entry into higher education.

In Scotland, students usually take Highers and Advanced Highers.

== T Levels ==
The T Level qualification is a new level 3 qualification, intended as a technical-based equivalent of A levels. As of September 2020, there were 193 colleges planning to offer some T Levels by 2022.

== Bachelor's degrees ==
A bachelor's degree is a course of higher education academic study leading to a qualification such as a Bachelor of Arts (BA) or Bachelor of Science (BSc). They are sometimes known as 'undergraduate' or 'first' degrees.

A bachelor's degree is designed to give learners a thorough understanding of a subject, and usually takes three years to complete full-time in England, Wales and Northern Ireland; in Scotland 'ordinary' bachelor's degrees normally take three years while bachelor's degrees with honours take four years.

Bachelor's degrees are at level 6 on the FHEQ in England, Wales and Northern Ireland; Scottish ordinary bachelor's degrees are at level 9 of the SCQF and honours bachelor's degrees at level 10. All UK bachelor's degrees are first cycle (end of cycle) qualifications in the Bologna Process.

Some awards titled bachelor's for historical reasons are actually master's-level degrees, e.g. Oxford's Bachelor of Philosophy (BPhil). Conversely, the Master of Arts awarded by some Scottish universities (mainly the ancient universities) is actually a bachelor's degree which has retained its historical title.

=== Graduate diploma ===
A graduate diploma (called an advanced diploma at some universities) is an FHEQ Level 6 award, equivalent to the final year of a bachelor's degree and generally offered to graduates who already hold a bachelor's degree in a different subject. Graduate diplomas may enable students to apply for postgraduate studies such as master's degree or postgraduate diplomas, but do not qualify as first-cycle qualification in the Bologna process.

== Diplomas (for 14- to 19-year-olds) ==
The 14–19 Diploma was a qualification for 14- to 19-year-olds, offering a more practical, hands-on way of gaining the essential skills employers and universities look for. The 14–19 Diplomas were at levels 1 to 3 on the NQF. From September 2008, Diplomas in five subject areas were made available in selected schools and colleges around the country. Further subjects were added every year until 2011 when there were 17 subjects available. Diploma courses were cancelled from September 30, 2013 onwards by the coalition government due to issues surrounding its popularity and how the qualifications were "viewed by employers and universities".

== Entry level qualifications ==
Entry level qualifications are known as 'certificates' or 'awards', and are designed for learners who are not yet ready to take qualifications at level 1 on the RQF.

They may be appropriate for learners who do not have traditional qualifications, or who have been away from learning for a long time. They are available in a variety of subjects, and at the three different sub-levels of the RQF's entry level.

== Foundation Degrees ==
Foundation Degrees are higher education qualifications that combine academic study with workplace learning. They have been designed jointly by universities, colleges and employers, and are available in a range of work-related subjects. They are broadly equivalent to the first two years of a bachelor's degree.or ordinary National Diploma/Certificate

Foundation Degrees are at level 5 on the FHEQ; they are not offered in Scotland.

== Higher Technical Qualifications ==
Higher Technical Qualifications (HTQs) in digital skills are to be available from September 2022, and cycle 2 Digital, Construction, and Health and Science Higher Technical Qualification routes are expected to be available from September 2023.

== GCSEs/National 5s ==
GCSEs (General Certificate of Secondary Education) are the main qualification taken by 14- to 16-year-olds (adults can take them as well) in England and Wales. They are available in a wide range of academic and applied (work-related) subjects, and as a ‘short-course’ option (equivalent to half a full GCSE).

GCSEs are at levels 1 and 2 on the RQF, depending on the grade achieved.

The Scottish equivalent of GCSE is the National 5 qualification.

== HNCs and HNDs ==
HNCs (Higher National Certificates) and HNDs (Higher National Diplomas) are work-related higher education qualifications.

HNCs can take one year to complete full-time. HNDs take two years full-time (both can be studied part-time). They are highly valued by employers, and can count towards membership of professional bodies and other employer organisations.

HNCs and HNDs are at levels 4 and 5 of the FHEQ.

== International Baccalaureate ==
The International Baccalaureate (IB) Diploma Programme is an internationally recognised qualification for students aged 16 to 19. It is based around detailed academic study of a wide range of subjects. The student is required to take at least one language, a science, maths, English, and a humanity. The sixth option can be used to pursue an arts subject (drama, music, art, etc.) or another language, or science, or humanity. The IB also encompasses a Core of Theory of Knowledge (ToK), CAS (Creativity, Action, Service), and the Extended Essay (EE). This leads to a single qualification.

The IB Diploma Programme is at level 3 on the RQF.

== Key Skills qualifications ==
Key Skills qualifications were designed to develop the skills that are commonly needed in education and training, work and life in general. They have been replaced by "Functional Skills" in England, "Essential Skills" in Northern Ireland and "Essential Skills Wales" in Wales.

== Postgraduate qualifications ==
Postgraduate qualifications are higher education qualifications at levels 7 or 8 of the FHEQ/levels 11 or 12 of the SCQF which require that learners have already completed a bachelor's degree. Most postgraduate qualifications will include taught and research elements, and are defined as either 'taught' or 'research' qualifications depending on which of these predominates. While all UK universities have taught degree awarding powers and can award taught postgraduate degrees, only bodies with research degree awarding powers may award research degrees.

Generally, they fall into three categories:

- Short courses at FHEQ level 7/SCQF level 11 (master's degree level) leading to Postgraduate Certificates and Postgraduate Diplomas, which are taught qualifications;
- Master's degrees (FHEQ level 7/SCQF level 11), which may be defined as either taught or research degrees;
- Doctoral degrees (FHEQ level 8/SCQF level 12), which are research degrees.

In addition to these, primary qualifications in medicine (Bachelor of Medicine, Bachelor of Surgery), dentistry (Bachelor of Dental Surgery) and veterinary science (Bachelor of Veterinary Science), and integrated master's degrees (e.g. Master of Engineering, Master of Physics, etc.) are undergraduate-entry courses that lead to postgraduate-level degrees (FHEQ level 7/SCQF level 11). The Scottish MA and the Oxbridge MA are not postgraduate qualifications.

In addition to postgraduate qualifications, the UK has graduate qualifications. These are short courses at FHEQ level 6/SCQF level 10 or 11 (bachelor's degree level); which last up to one year, lead to Graduate Certificates and Graduate Diploma, and require students to have already gained a first degree.

== Skills for Life qualifications ==
Skills for Life (sometimes referred to as Basic Skills qualifications) are designed to help learners develop their reading, writing, maths and ICT skills. There is also a Skills for Life qualification in English for Speakers of Other Languages (ESOL).

They are available for those learners who are over 16 years of age, have left compulsory full-time education and do not have an up-to-date English or maths qualification at level 2 (such as a GCSE) on the NQF. In some cases, schools can offer the qualifications for 14- to 16-year-olds.

Skills for Life qualifications are available at entry level on the RQF.

== Vocational qualifications ==
Vocational qualifications (also known as Vocationally Recognised Qualifications, or VRQs) are designed to give learners the skills and knowledge to do a particular job, work in a particular industry, or acquire more general skills. They are offered by awarding bodies such as City and Guilds, Edexcel, OCR, NCFE and ABC Awards.

They are available at various levels on the RQF, and in different sizes.

The range of vocational qualifications includes competence-based National Vocational Qualifications (NVQs) which can be taken at work, college, or as part of an Apprenticeship. They are based on national standards for various occupations, and cover the practical, work-related tasks designed to help learners do a job effectively. NVQs are at levels 1 to 7 on the RQF.

== See also ==
- Secondary education
- Further education
- Lifelong learning
- Recognising and Recording Progress and Achievement
