= Education in Ireland =

Education in Ireland may refer to

- Education in the Republic of Ireland (since 1922)
- Education in Northern Ireland (since 1922)
- History of education in Ireland (until 1922)
