= Key Skills Qualification =

British educational qualification

The Key Skills Qualification is a frequently required component of 14-20 education in England, Northern Ireland and Wales. The aim of Key Skills is to encourage learners to develop and demonstrate their skills as well as learn how to select and apply skills in ways that are appropriate to their particular context.

It is generally available in secondary schools (alongside GCSEs, A-levels or other qualifications), Further Education colleges (alongside NVQ, as part of Apprenticeship training or other equivalent vocational or academic courses) and other places of learning (sometimes alongside other qualifications and sometimes independently). The qualifications can be taken at levels 1–4.

The Department for Children, Schools and Families in England and the Department for Children, Education, Lifelong Learning and Skills in Wales define Key Skills as "a range of essential skills that underpin success in education, employment, lifelong learning and personal development". The DfES website states that the Key Skills Qualification is offered as a response to concern from employers about lack of essential skills in young recruits and as part of the response to the 1996 Dearing Report. Key Skills qualifications at levels 2-4 attract UCAS Tariff points for University admissions. The UCAS tariff is a points system used to report achievement for entry to higher education (HE) in a numerical format.

== Subjects ==
Key Skills Qualifications are offered in six areas:

- Communication

speaking, listening, reading and writing skills

- Application of Number

interpreting information involving numbers, carrying out calculations, interpreting results and presenting findings

- Information Communication Technology

finding, exploring, developing and presenting information including text, images and numbers

- Working with others

includes process and interpersonal skills to support working cooperatively with others to achieve shared objectives, work cooperatively and have regard for others

- Improving own learning and performance

developing independent learners who are clearly focused on what they want to achieve and able to work towards targets that will improve the quality of their learning and performance. The standards include process skills, e.g., target-setting, planning, learning, reviewing and interpersonal skills, e.g., communicating own needs, accepting constructive feedback, negotiating learning opportunities and support

- Problem solving

encouraging learners to develop and demonstrate their ability to tackle problems systematically, for the purpose of working towards their solution and learning from this process. Three types or combinations of problems are dealt with: diagnostic problems that depend primarily on analysis to arrive at conclusions, design problems that depend mainly on synthesis to create a product or process, and contingency problems that typically involve resource allocation and gaining the cooperation of others, e.g. when organising an event

The first three Key Skills are sometimes referred to as the 'main' Key Skills. They incorporate the basic skills of literacy and numeracy. The remaining three are often referred to as the 'wider' or 'soft' Key Skills.

Assessment arrangements for Key Skills vary between England, Wales and Northern Ireland (see below). Key Skills may be examined in a variety of ways including internal, external or set tasks. Internal assessment means the production of a portfolio of work demonstrating satisfaction of the Key Skills targets. The Internal assessment (portfolio) must be internally verified and externally moderated. External assessment consists of a test or examination in the subject, often in formal examination conditions. Set tasks are similar to portfolios without the flexibility of the latter.

== Levels and progression ==
The Qualifications are offered over four levels: level one, two, three and four. These levels correspond to the levels used for other qualifications within the national qualifications framework. Progression to a higher level is characterised by: - greater autonomy from the individual in deciding how they will apply their skills to suit different tasks and problems
- greater demands made by the situation in which the skills are applied
- use of a wider range and more complex techniques.

Key Skills Level 1 helps candidates to develop the basic skills that are important for key skills competence, and recognises their ability to apply these skills in meeting given purposes within routine situations. Level 1 is broadly related in terms of level of demand, to GCSE grades D-G or National Curriculum level 5.

Key Skills Level 2 builds on level 1 by requiring candidates to extend their basic skills. It recognises their ability to take responsibility for some decisions about how they select and apply these skills to meet the demands of largely straightforward tasks. Level 2 can be broadly related, in terms of level of demand, to GCSE grades A*–C.

Key Skills Level 3 marks a shift from straightforward tasks to being capable of responding to the demands of more complex activities. Candidates need to demonstrate more explicit reasoning ability and personal responsibility in making decisions about how tasks are organised. Level 3 can be broadly related, in terms of level of demand, to an A grade at A level

The higher levels, levels 4 and 5, describe those skills relevant to technical and professional situations and higher level study.

Key Skills Level 4 requires candidates to have substantial autonomy and responsibility for managing activities and for identifying how the key skills relate to their situation. It recognises ability to develop a strategy for using key skills over an extended period of time, monitor and critically reflect on progress and adapt strategy, as necessary, to achieve the quality of outcomes required.

At Key Skill Level 5, there is a single standard (personal skills development). This standard requires candidates to apply their key skills in communication, working with others and problem solving, in an integrated way, in order to improve their own learning and performance in managing professionally challenging work.

Source: QCA (Qualifications and Curriculum Authority) The Key Skills Qualifications Standards and Guidance, 2004.

== Key Skills Awards ==
According to the UK National Statistics office, up to September 2006, almost 2.2 million Key Skills qualifications had been awarded. There were 692 thousand awards of Key Skills qualifications in 2005/06 alone. 522 thousand of all Key Skills qualifications were for main Key Skills, up 19 per cent on the previous year. 170 thousand of all Key Skills qualifications were for wider Key Skills, up 61 per cent on the previous year.

The most popular key skills continue to be communication awards (206 thousand awards in 2005/06 compared to 150 thousand ICT awards. Application of Number is still the fastest growing main Key Skill qualification, up by 27 per cent on the previous year to 166 thousand Since their introduction as a Qualification in 2004, the wider key skills continue to grow. Between 2004/05 and 2005/06, there was an increase of at least 60 per cent in the number of awards for each of the wider Key Skills such that wider Key Skills accounted for almost a quarter of awards of all Key Skills qualifications in 2005/06, compared with around a fifth in 2004/05.

Source: [Department for Education and Skills] rsgateway/DB/SFR/ AWARDS OF KEY SKILLS QUALIFICATIONS: 2005/06 SFR 14/2007.

== England ==
Schools generally determine the level of entrance dependent on past achievement. Those who achieved under grade C at GCSE in the corresponding subject (English, Mathematics or Information Technology respectively) are asked to take the corresponding level two Qualification. Those who achieved over grade C at GCSE are recommended to take level three or four.

Those who take the corresponding subjects at AS/A-level (or equivalent) are generally excluded from the external assessment in that subject, as the completion of the corresponding subject certifies the academic achievement required.

By 2010 the main three key skills will be replaced by Functional Skills in England, which will form part of the new Specialised Diploma Framework. The wider key skills will continue to be accredited.

=== Proxy ===
Students with a GCSE (or equiv.) up to grade D in the subject associated to the Key Skill (i.e. IT, English or Maths) are exempt from taking the test for level 1 and can be entered for a proxy, this means that only the portfolio need be completed. The same applies to level 2 Key Skills if the student has a GCSE (or equiv.) grade C or above.

The exception to this is Key Skills ICT where a proxy makes the student exempt from both the test AND the portfolio. It is important to establish the correct level to be aimed for initially, especially when it comes to ICT.

== Wales ==
In Wales Key Skills have been replaced with Essential Skills Wales (ESW) (as of September 2010.) Essential Skills Wales is the suite of skills qualifications which replaced the previous Key Skills of Communication, Application of Number and ICT, and the Basic Skills of Adult Literacy, Adult Numeracy and Skills for Life ICT. These skills can be achieved through the medium of Welsh or English.

== Scotland ==
Scotland has a separate Core Skills qualification. One of the main aims of Higher Still qualifications in Scotland is to develop the capabilities people need to be responsible members of society. All students at all levels must obtain qualifications in all five Core Skills if they wish to obtain a Scottish Group Award. The Core skills enable people to put their knowledge and understanding into action.

The Five Core Skills are:

- Communication

Oral and Written Communication

- Numeracy

Using Graphical Information, Using Number

- Information Technology

Using Information Technology

- Problem Solving

Critical Thinking, Planning and Organising, Reviewing and Evaluating

- Working With Others

Working With Others

== See also ==
- Welsh Baccalaureate Qualification
- Victorian Certificate of Applied Learning
