= Recognising and Recording Progress and Achievement =

Recognising and recording progress and achievement (RARPA), in the education sector in England, is an approach for measuring the progress and achievement of learners on some further education courses which do not lead to an externally accredited award or qualification. The majority of such courses are in the adult and community learning sector and other non-accredited learning settings.

== Background ==
RARPA was developed by a group of practitioners who were considering the issue of how to recognise and validate learning that takes place where there is no accredited qualification as an outcome. The Learning and Skills Council (LSC) commissioned the Learning and Skills Development Agency (LSDA) and the National Institute of Adult Continuing Education (NIACE) to contribute to the development of the measure as part of the 'New Measures of Success'.

RARPA was developed as part of the Learning and Skills Council’s new measures of success. These new measures aim to harmonise the basis for measuring educational achievement, so that the performance of learners in different parts of the learning and skills sector can be more accurately compared.

== Process ==
RARPA is designed to support teaching and learning practices. It claims to help teachers to deliver personalised learning, with a view to ensuring that learning is taking place and that the learner is making progress. RARPA is intended to encourage learners to engage actively by measuring their own progress and achievements.

RARPA is a tool that can serve as a measure of accountability. This means that the learning experience is subject to the formal inspection and quality assurance processes of the further education sector.

The RARPA approach has five distinct staged processes: aims and objectives, initial assessment, learning objectives, identification of learning, and review and recording.

=== Aims and objectives ===
The ostensible aims of the course of learning should be communicated clearly to learners before they make a decision about their individual route to achievement.

=== Initial assessment ===
Learners’ previous achievements, current skills and learning needs should be properly considered before a decision has been made about their particular route to achievement.

=== Learning objectives ===
A set of learning outcomes should be agreed with each learner that is consistent with their learning goal(s). These outcomes should be based on their identified needs and challenge them to make real progress in their learning achievement There should be opportunities, if necessary, to revise these learning outcomes during the course.

=== Identification of learning ===
The progress of learners should be recognised and recorded, through means of formative assessment by the teacher, and by learners themselves.

=== Review and recording ===
Learners should be given regular opportunities to assess progress towards their learning outcomes and to review their planned route to achievement. Learners’ success in reaching their planned goal(s) should be recognised through a process appropriate to their needs that summarises their achievements and identifies possible future goals.

== See also ==
- Learning and Skills Network
- Adult education
- Community education
- Formative assessment
