= Welsh Baccalaureate =

Secondary education qualification in the United Kingdom

The Welsh Baccalaureate (Welsh: Bagloriaeth Cymru), or Welsh Bacc, is an educational qualification delivered in secondary schools and colleges across Wales. The Welsh Government says that it gives broader experiences than traditional learning programmes, developing transferable skills useful for education and employment. The Welsh Bacc is offered at Advanced (level 3), National (level 2) Foundation (level 1) and National/Foundation level, and is studied alongside a range of academic and vocational qualifications.

The new Welsh Baccalaureate was introduced for teaching from September 2015 and was designed and developed in response to the findings of the 2012 Review of Qualifications for 14 to 19 year-olds in Wales. The primary aim is to enable learners to develop and demonstrate an understanding of, and proficiency in, essential and employability skills: Communication, Numeracy, Digital Literacy, Planning and Organisation, Creativity and Innovation, Critical Thinking and Problem Solving, and Personal Effectiveness.

The new Welsh Baccalaureate differs from the legacy Baccalaureate (first made available across Wales in 2007 and last awarded in 2016) in both content and structure, most noticeably with the inclusion of the Skill Certificate Challenge qualification which can also be awarded independently of the WB. WJEC is the awarding body for the Welsh Baccalaureate.

== Award from 2015 ==
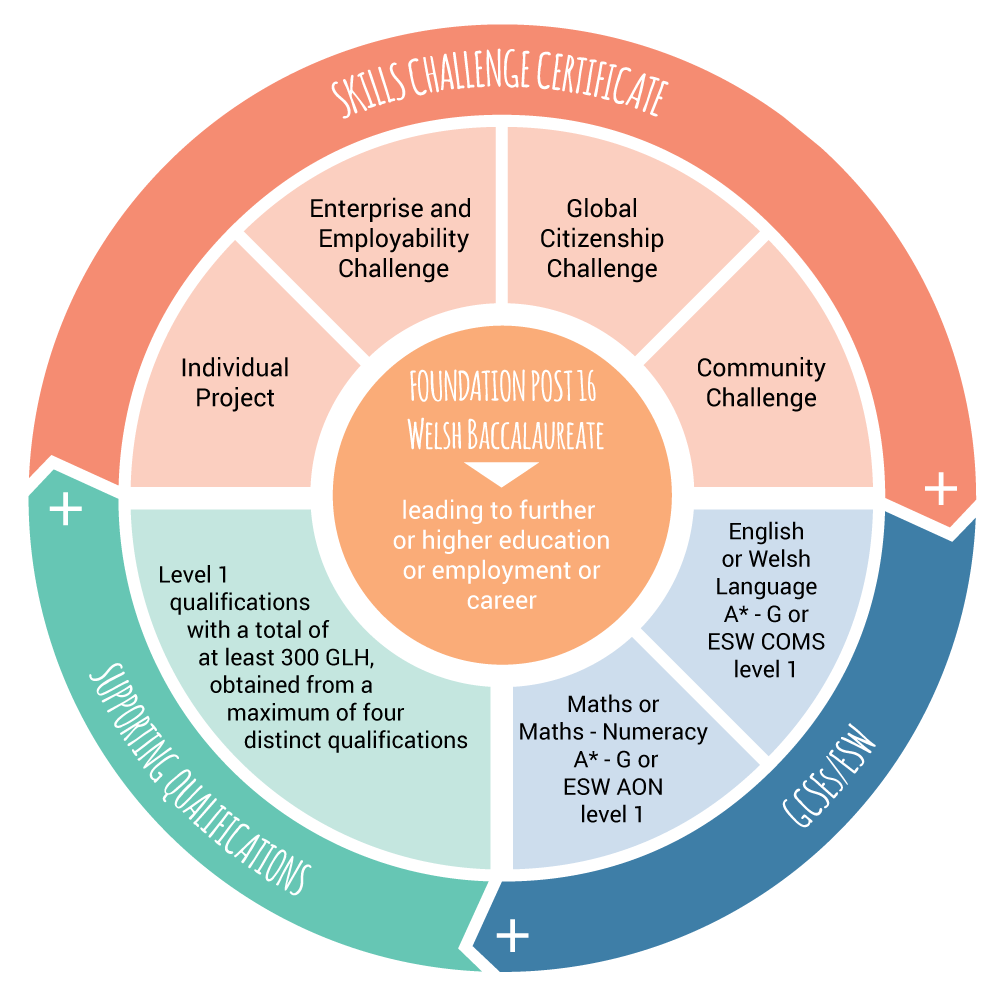
Structure for the Post 16 Foundation Welsh Baccalaureate

The Welsh Bacc is awarded at the following levels:

- National/Foundation (levels 1 & 2) A two-year course delivered at key stage 4 to provide a vehicle for 14–16 year-olds to consolidate and develop essential and employability skills. Should the supporting General Certificates of Secondary Education (GCSEs) be graded A*-C the students will awarded the National level, if the supporting GCSES are graded A-G, students will be awarded the Welsh Bacc at Foundation level.
- Foundation – Level 1 A one-year course delivered at post-16 stage in the context and level of the chosen learning programme.
- National – Level 2 A one-year course delivered at post-16 stage for Level 2 learners.
- Advanced - Level 3 A two-year course delivered at post-16 stage for Level 3 learners.

== Legacy structure and requirements ==
The legacy Welsh Baccalaureate Qualification, which was last awarded in 2016, consists of two parts – a compulsory Core and a choice of Options, which are made up of optional subjects or qualifications which the student may be following. Together, the Core and Options make up the Welsh Baccalaureate Qualification. Options are the courses/programmes currently studied by the student alongside the Core e.g. General Certificate of Secondary Education (GCSE), Advanced Subsidiary/Advanced (AS / A levels), BTec, Principal Learning. The Options requirements depend on the level of the Welsh Baccalaureate being followed. The Welsh Baccalaureate Advanced Diploma attracts 120 UCAS (university entry) points, the same as an A grade in an A Level subject. The awarding organisation for the Welsh Baccalaureate Qualification is WJEC. The structure of the Welsh Baccalaureate Core is the same at all three levels and consists of:

- Essential Skills Wales/Key Skills qualifications (Exact requirements depend on the level followed)
- Wales, Europe and the World (WEW)
- Personal and Social Education (PSE)
- Work-related Education (WRE)- work experience and a team enterprise activity
- Community Participation
- Language Module
- Individual Investigation (Exact requirements depend on the level followed)

== Developments ==
The Welsh Baccalaureate began in September 2003 as a pilot scheme involving 18 schools and colleges in Wales. The qualification was rolled out to centres across Wales in September 2007. By September 2012, 75,000 learners in 240 schools, colleges and work based learning centres were registered for the Welsh Baccalaureate courses. The Welsh Bac has become a familiar part of the educational landscape in Wales with all colleges and only a small minority of schools not delivering at least one level of the qualification.

=== Review of Qualifications for 14- to 19-year-olds in Wales ===
In the Review of Qualifications consultation document, published on 31 May 2012, the Review Board considered that the Welsh Bac was making an important contribution to the education of over 73,000 learners in Wales. The consultation document noted that 'The Board is currently of the view that the Welsh Baccalaureate has both relevance and value, that it should be further developed and promoted, and that eventually it should be universally adopted at 14–19 across Wales.

The consultation went on to say "Feedback to the Review has been largely positive about the Welsh Baccalaureate. Stakeholders like its use of established qualifications in its options, the development of skills (including testing aspects of literacy and numeracy) in its Core, together with elements valued by employers and universities such as work experience, community participation and independent research."

=== Grading ===
The Qualifications Review Board has proposed that the Welsh Baccalaureate should be graded at the Advanced level to maintain its currency for higher education admission and to ensure that learners' differing achievements are properly recognised. The Review Board indicated that further views would be canvassed about whether the Intermediate and Foundation levels should be graded.

=== Current levels of achievement ===
Figures released by the awarding organisation WJEC in August 2012 reported that a total of 8,259 candidates were awarded the Advanced Diploma, compared with 6,948 in 2011, the highest entry to date for this qualification. This represented 83% of those who completed the course. The successful candidates achieved at least two A levels or equivalent academic or vocational qualifications, as well as meeting the requirements of the Welsh Baccalaureate Core, including gaining Essential Skills Wales (ESW, and Key Skills (KS) and personal development modules.

Having met the full range of requirements of the Core components, 8,747 or 88% of the candidates who completed the course achieved the Welsh Baccalaureate Advanced Core Certificate.

In 2012, a record 7,210 or 73% of candidates achieved the Welsh Baccalaureate Intermediate Diploma, compared with 67% in 2011. The number of candidates completing the programme also rose to 9,940, an increase of 3,937 or 66% on 2011. A further 990 candidates achieved the Welsh Baccalaureate Core Certificate.

At Foundation level, 3,521 candidates completed the programme, an increase of 23% compared with 2,858 last year. Of these, 2,236 or 64% achieved the Foundation Diploma, compared with 1,873 or 66% last year. A further 279 candidates achieved the Core Certificate at the Foundation level.

== Research and evaluation ==
=== Academic research ===
Research on the Welsh Baccalaureate has been generally positive. The University of Bath were the internal evaluators and produced a number of reports evaluating the development of the Welsh Baccalaureate. A Final Report of the External Evaluation of the Welsh Baccalaureate Qualification (WBQ) Pilot was also carried out by the University of Nottingham. Both internal and external evaluations were largely positive, emphasising the positive impact of the Welsh Bac in broadening the learner experience.

Estyn reports on the Advanced Level (2012) and the Welsh Bac in Key Stage 4 in schools (2008) were generally positive about the impact of the qualification, although there were some concerns about the differences in quality of delivery in Welsh Bac centres.

In 2009, the Nuffield Foundation funded a Review of 14–19 Education and Training in which the Welsh Bac was praised. The report calls for a baccalaureate system for secondary schools; asks why many young people drop out of education and training in their late teens; and offers contrasts between England's approach to school reform and that which has operated in Wales since Devolution. Among the Review's recommendations was that "England should learn from the Welsh attempts to incorporate in its 'Learning Pathways' a broader and more flexible vision of progression." The Review supports the continued development of the Welsh Baccalaureate so that it becomes the organising framework for all 14 – 19 learners in Wales.

The current affairs programme 'Dragon's Eye' broadcast 1 May 2012, reported on work published by Chris Taylor and colleagues at Wales Institute of Social & Economic Research, Data & Methods (WISERD) based at Cardiff University. Taylor's work suggested that the performance of Welsh Bac qualified students did not match their apparent A level points score. One explanation is that since the Welsh Bac is ungraded, students who pass it cover a wide range of abilities and ability is known to be a strong predictor of success at university. Taylor commented "This suggests that the WBQ would benefit from being graded." He added "Our findings also raise a concern about the overall quality of the WBQ and whether there are any apparent benefits of this qualification on university progress and outcomes." The conclusions in the Report were however qualified by a recognition of the limitations of the analysis. Taylor added "We would not want to argue that the WBQ is systematically worth less than an A grade at A Level. And indeed, rejecting the use of the WBQ in helping to determine entry and conditional offers ignores the 'opportunity cost' for a student of not having taken another qualification or A Level."

Following the publication of the Report, Cardiff University clarified their position regarding Welsh Baccalaureate applicants. The 2012–13 prospectus states that "Cardiff University accepts the Welsh Baccalaureate Advanced Diploma for admission to all its undergraduate degree programmes. If you are taking the Welsh Baccalaureate Advanced Diploma, and the University decides to make you an offer for study on any of its programme, the offer will be based on a pass in the Core plus specified grades and subjects, where applicable, in the Options."

In 2004, UCAS confirmed that the Advanced Level would attract 120 UCAS points. The 2009 Expert Group Report for Review of Award in the UCAS Tariff confirmed the award of 120 UCAS tariff points for the Welsh Baccalaureate Advanced Diploma.

In 2018, Welsh exams watchdog Qualifications Wales said the skills at the heart of the qualification were highly relevant for future study and employment, but that the Welsh Baccalaureate is too complex and a number of pupils, teachers and parents do not understand it.

=== Debate ===
In 2002, Colin Jenkins and John David, who developed the original Welsh Baccalaureate proposal for the Institute of Welsh Affairs (IWA), criticised the Welsh Bac because it did not follow their model, based on the International Baccalaureate Diploma Programme. They said they were disappointed and considered the Welsh Bac to be "missing a huge opportunity." They considered the WBQ to be a "feeble quick fix", "not a baccalaureate", and as "Curriculum 2000 with a bit of icing". They added that the language requirement was "a waste of time."

Jane Davidson, Welsh Government Minister for Education, Lifelong Learning & Skills from 2000 to 2007, responded to the pair's criticism by describing the Welsh Baccalaureate as "a significant innovation which will broaden students' programmes and bring coherence to them" in a programme that was "distinctive, modern and proudly Welsh". She said that the contract had been put out to tender and no tenders had been received based on the IWA model. Jeff Jones, chair of the WJEC when it bid for and developed the WBQ, stated in 2011 that he thought at the time that the WBQ "looked like nonsense" but that the WJEC "needed the money and in any case we had to bid because we were the Welsh exam board". Jones added that the WBQ was "really an A level with a load of nonsense added on" and added:

It isn't a proper Bac where students at 18 would still be required to study maths, English, a science and a language, not meaningless Mickey Mouse additions. What the heck is the use of 'Wales and the World' for a start? No wonder Russell Group universities who can get students from England with four A stars are not that interested. If I were a student I wouldn't touch it with a barge pole.

Most Welsh secondary schools mandate their 6th form students study the Welsh Baccalaureate alongside their A Level studies insisting it's a compulsory subject that "complements" a student's learning experience. However, Mr Jones' comments were challenged by David Evans, Wales Secretary of the National Union of Teachers, who described them as "scaremongering".

== See also ==
- Education in Wales
- English Baccalaureate
- International Baccalaureate
