= Curriculum 2000 =

Education policy in the United Kingdom

Curriculum 2000 was a reform of A Level examinations in the United Kingdom.

== Structure ==
Curriculum 2000 was introduced in September 2000 (with the first AS-Level examinations held in Summer 2001 and A2 examinations the following year). An A Level under this reform consists of four or six units studied over two years. Normally, two or three units are assessed at the end of the first year, and make up a stand-alone Advanced Subsidiary (AS Level) qualification. Another two or three modules are assessed at the end of the second year, which make up the A2 Level. A2 units do not form a qualification in their own right; the satisfactory completion of the AS and A2 units in the same subject is required to constitute a complete A Level qualification.

Curriculum 2000 allowed students to take as many resits as they wanted. Curriculum 2000 allowed different types of qualifications to be taken together in a "mix-and-match" way.

Due to the modular structure, units could be taken in January and June of the year, though January exams were abolished after the January 2013 exam session. To begin with each unit could only be retaken once, but this limit was later removed. Some schools choose to conduct all AS and A2 examinations at the end of the first or second years. In the former case, this means students complete the A-level in one year, which is possible for more academically able students. In the latter case, students do not have the opportunity to resit any units and have a more stressful workload at the end of their second year, although by reducing the amount of time taken for exam leave and conducting examinations, more time is available to study the subject in more depth.

The reforms applied in England, Wales and Northern Ireland.

== Response ==
The reaction to the new style and structure of qualifications was mixed; whilst many schools and colleges welcomed the increased flexibility and the nature of the modules, the Key Skills courses were increasingly targeted as a failure. Many students were exempt from taking these courses as they had the relevant GCSEs, leaving some classes empty. General apathy towards the courses from UCAS and most universities meant that Key Skills was dropped from some LEAs requirements by the end of 2003.

Some have criticised the modular system for nurturing a 'resit culture' due to the 'generous' resit system, and causing perceived 'grade inflation' where the proportion of candidates achieving higher grades increases, thus eroding the value of those grades. Additionally, while the most academically able candidates benefited from completing some of the subject content early, some felt ill-prepared to take half of their A level exams only a year after taking GCSE exams, not having a second year to improve their grades. Michael Gove, who implemented the A level changes which succeeded Curriculum 2000 has described the modular system as an exam 'treadmill' due to the frequency of examinations.

== Succession ==
For first teaching from 2015 through 2018 it was succeeded by a new curriculum (first assessment 2017), which reversed most changes brought in by Curriculum 2000 (reverting to linear qualifications where all exams are taken at the end of each course), though kept AS Levels as standalone qualifications which still encompass the first year of the full A level content. Most traditional subjects were reformed in 2015, followed by more in successive years. The changes were completed in 2018.
