= Central school =

Type of English and Welsh state secondary school, 1910-postwar

A central school was a selective secondary education school with a focus on technical and commercial skills in the English education system. It was positioned between the more academic grammar schools and the ordinary elementary schools where most pupils prior to 1944 were educated to 14 years of age.

Central schools were established in England and Wales following the Education Act 1918, although London County Council had already introduced them in 1910 and ran fifty by 1918.

Following the introduction of the tripartite system of selective education and the changes introduced by the Education Act 1944, many central schools became Secondary Modern schools or the premises otherwise absorbed in the post-WWII education system.

== See also ==
- History of education in England
