= History of education in Ireland =

In medieval Gaelic Ireland, centres of learning were monasteries and bardic schools.

The first state-funded educational institutions in Ireland were Church of Ireland diocesan schools established in the 16th century. The first printing press in Ireland was established in 1551, the first Irish-language book was printed in 1571 and Trinity College Dublin was established in 1592.

The Education Act 1695 (7 Will. 3. c. 4 (I)) prohibited Irish Catholics from running Catholic schools in Ireland or seeking a Catholic education abroad, until its repeal by the Roman Catholic Relief Act 1782 (21 & 22 Geo. 3. c. 24 (I)). As a result, highly informal secret operations that met in private homes were established, called "hedge schools." Historians generally agree that hedge schools provided a kind of schooling, occasionally at a high level, for up to 400,000 students in 9,000 schools, by the mid-1820s. J. R. R. Adams says the hedge schools testified "to the strong desire of ordinary Irish people to see their children receive some sort of education." Antonia McManus argues that there "can be little doubt that Irish parents set a high value on a Hedge school education and made enormous sacrifices to secure it for their children....[the Hedge schoolteacher was] one of their own". The 1782 repeal of the 1695 penal laws had made the Hedge schools legal, although still not in receipt of funding from the Parliament of Ireland.

Formal schools for Catholics under trained teachers began to appear after 1800. Edmund Ignatius Rice (1762–1844) founded two religious institutes of religious brothers: the Congregation of Christian Brothers and the Presentation Brothers. They opened numerous schools, which were visible, legal, and standardised. Discipline was notably strict.

From 1811, the Society for the Promotion of the Education of the Poor of Ireland (Kildare Place Society, which evolved into the Church of Ireland College of Education), started to established a nationwide network of non-profit, non-denominational schools, in part funded through the production and sales of textbooks. By 1831, they were operating 1,621 primary schools, and educating approximately 140,000 pupils.

In 1831, the Stanley letter led to the establishment of the Board of National Education and the National School system using public money. The Government of the United Kingdom of Great Britain and Ireland appointed the Commissioner of National Education whose task was to assist in funding primary school construction, teacher training, the producing of textbooks, and funding of teachers.

Hedge schools declined after 1831 as the Catholic bishops preferred this, as the new schools would be largely under the control of the Catholic Church and allow better control of the teaching of Catholic doctrine.

Since the Partition of Ireland, the systems in Northern Ireland and the Republic of Ireland have diverged.
