= Newcastle Commission =

The title page of the 1861 report of the Newcastle Commission.

The Newcastle Commission set up in 1859 inquired "into the state of public education in England and to consider and report what measures, if any, are required for the extension of sound and cheap elementary instruction to all classes of the people". It produced the 1861 Newcastle Report and this led to the Elementary Education Act 1870 (33 & 34 Vict. c. 75).

== Context ==
In the 1850s, much of the schooling of the working-classes was still informal or semi-formal. On the whole there was little geographical consistency. Some schooling was provided privately, though most was organised through the workhouse schools, the Anglican National Schools and the non-conformist British Schools. The factory school envisaged by the Factory Act 1833 which had made it compulsory for mill-owners to provide prove apprentices were receiving an education, never materialised. Instead this was done by producing a certificate of attendance at schools elsewhere.

Formal teaching was done using the Lancaster-Bell monitorial method where one qualified teacher would drill a class of up to 120 children, with the assistance of several senior boys or pupil teachers, who he would train up in class.

Public provision for elementary education began with a grant of £20,000 in 1833 in aid of school buildings, but had risen to £724,000 by 1860. There was sectarian divide that even blocked the appointment of state school inspectors. In 1839 the government succeeded in establishing a Committee of the Privy Council on Education which appointed James Kay-Shuttleworth as secretary. He had attempted to reform teacher training through providing four teacher training colleges – though, as the pay for teachers remained at £90 a year, many had left teaching to study for the church.

By 1850 education had stagnated, and in the view of the Conservative (Anglican) politicians it was costing too much.

== The commission ==
The Newcastle Commission set up in 1859 was chaired by the Duke of Newcastle. Its aim was to ascertain whether public money was being well spent when given at grants to existing schools.

== The findings ==
It concluded that the system was working though not as efficiently as it could. It was disparaging on the operation of factory schools. It reported: "The number of children whose names ought (in summer 1858 in England and Wales) to have been on the school books, in order that all might receive some education, was 2,655,767. The number we found to be actually on the books was 2,535,462, thus leaving 120,305 children without any school instruction whatever."

They looked at the previous years data and found that 2,213,694 children of the poorer classes were in elementary day schools. But of this number:

- 573,536 were attending private schools, such as Dame schools where a woman provided child care facilities and a little reading, writing and arithmetic in her own home. These failed to give the children an education which would be serviceable to them in after-life.
- The other 1,549,312 children were attending public elementary day schools belonging to the religious denominations (church schools), but all but 19.3% were under 12, so were in primary departments. Only 300,000 were receiving any form of extended education, which was believed to be essential.
- As many as 786,202 attend for less than 100 days in the year and can therefore hardly receive a serviceable amount of education
- A large proportion of the teaching was inefficiently done

"Much, therefore, still remains to be done to bring up the state of elementary education in England and Wales to the degree of usefulness which we all regard as attainable and desirable"

== Payment by results ==
In general, it considered that the system of state aid had worked well, but that the objectives had been set too high for the majority of children who attended these schools. Results should be tested to ensure that schools were providing value for money.

A recommendation was made that school funding should continue but be made up of two parts, a small per capita sum and a larger sum based on whether the child passed an annual test.

This enabled Robert Lowe, the minister who spoke for the education department in the House of Commons, to establish the Revised Code in 1862 linking annual grants to pupil results.

== Bibliography ==
- Brown, John Richard (11 January 2011). "The state intervenes 1833-1862". richardjohnbr.blogspot.co.uk.
- Gillard, Derek. "The History of Education in England - History". www.educationengland.org.uk.
- Heffer, Simon. High minds: the Victorians and the birth of modern Britain (2013) pp 412–69.
