= Secondary technical school =

Former type of English secondary school

Secondary technical schools, referred to colloquially as secondary techs or simply techs, were a type of secondary school in England and Wales that existed in the mid-20th century under the Tripartite System of education. Few were built; their main interest is theoretical.

The Education Act 1944 (also known as the Butler Education Act after its creator, Rab Butler), which applied only to England and Wales, promised a system of free secondary schooling. The system was introduced with three tiers. In addition to grammar schools and secondary modern schools, the government intended there to be a series of secondary technical schools that would teach mechanical, scientific and engineering skills to serve industry and science.

== History ==
The 1944 Act (the Butler Act) replaced all previous education law in England and Wales, removing the Board of Education, replacing it with the Ministry of Education. It established that all maintained schooling was to be free. There were to be three tiers of secondary state schools: grammar schools (entrance based on ability with the option of an 11-plus); technical secondary schools; secondary moderns. Further education was to be delivered through county colleges for school-leavers up to 18 years of age.

This reasoning had been based on the 1943 Norwood Report, the experiences gained in the 1930s and the skills shortages encountered during the ongoing war.

"the various kinds of technical schools, which were not instituted to satisfy the intellectual needs of an arbitrarily assumed group of children, but to prepare boys and girls for taking up certain crafts – engineering, agriculture and the like. Nevertheless it is usual to think of the engineer or other craftsman as possessing a particular set of interests or aptitudes by virtue of which he becomes a successful engineer or whatever he may become".

Local authorities were given a deal of freedom on how this was to be implemented, and while it was easy to create two branches from existing building stock, technical schools often had to be built afresh. As a result, in most LEA areas, pupils were not selected from the 11-plus as originally proposed, but from a separate, voluntary set of examinations taken at the age of 12 or 13. Kent was one authority that embraced the changes and implemented the system according to the letter of the law. These schools were invariably single sex, and usually recruited their entrants from the lower end of the 'selective' band (as measured at the age of 11). Admission was at first at the age of 13, but later at 11. There was still a difficulty in providing suitable accommodation, and the Wilmington schools in Kent provide a case study.

=== Wilmington case study ===
Technical education could be traced back to Mechanics' Institutes founded in the early part of the nineteenth century. The Dartford Technical Institute as an example started in Essex Road, Dartford in 1902 and introduced training for boys and girls in about 1925. In 1941 it started a technical school in Essex Road with an acting headteacher. After the 1944 Act, in 1949, the technical school was renamed Dartford Technical School and moved into Wilmington Hall. No separate buildings were erected until 1956, and the following year the school had an entry of 120. It had an agricultural stream, so came with a school farm. In 1961, that stream was discontinued. Kent was ready to phase out technical schools and rebrand them as grammar schools. Dartford Technical High School started to offer A-levels in 1964 and a building programme commenced. In 1967 there was a major school reorganisation: the girls' tech moved off site in 1974, the boys' became Wilmington Grammar School for Boys and a new secondary modern school is built over the demolished Wilmington Hall. There were further status changes in 1984, proposed in 1989, in 1991, 1999 and 2004.

=== Nationally ===
Whereas the other two branches of the tripartite system would be built over the decade from 1944, the technical schools barely materialised. At their peak, only 2% to 3% of children attended one.

== Analysis ==
Technical schools were a modest success, given their limited resources and lack of government attention. Their curriculum was well shaped for dealing with real world employment, and had a solid practical edge. The schools had good links with industry and commerce. In many ways, the technical school was the forerunner of the City Technology College of the 1980s and 1990s.

Other than a simple lack of resources, three reasons have been proposed for the failure of the technical school.

- Trade unions felt that technical education was their responsibility, mainly through the apprentice system. It is argued that they tried to undermine the technical school from the outset to preserve their own position.
- There was a difficulty in obtaining teachers who had skills in the relevant areas.
- The schools were consciously designed as being for those not suitable for high academic attainment. This meant that they had lower status than grammar schools and were seen as second-best to them. They were used in many cases for borderline pass/fail results in the 11-plus.
