= Skills for Life =

English educational strategy

Skills for Life is a national lifelong learning strategy in England for improving adult skills, designed to help learners develop their reading, writing, maths, technical, and digital skills. It provides universal free education and training; including courses in digital, numeracy and transferable skills; traineeships; apprenticeships; and vocational qualifications for all adults (19 and over) in further education colleges and beyond.

The courses and qualifications provided by training providers can also be provided by employees and businesses, and can be taken in Skill Bootcamps at colleges and universities throughout England. It is linked with the National Careers Service.

== Training courses ==
Training courses include classroom-based, on-the-job, online, and short courses. The full list can be found on the Skills for Life website.

- Courses for jobs
- Multiply (a new government-funded programme to help adults improve numeracy skills)
- Skills Bootcamps
- Returnerships (courses and training for over 50s)
- Digital – Essential Skills
- Numeracy – Essential Skills
- English – Essential Skills (including ESOL)
- Higher Technical Qualifications (HTQs)
- Apprenticeships
- The Skills Toolkit
- Sector-based Work Academy Programme (SWAP)

== Skills for Life (2001-2010) ==
Skills for Life was also a national strategy in England for improving adult literacy, language (ESOL) and numeracy skills and was established as part of the wider national skills strategy by the Labour Party from 2001 to 2010. The strategy set out how the government aimed to reach its Public Service Agreement (PSA) target to improve "the basic skill levels of 2.25 million adults between the launch of Skills for Life in 2001 and 2010, with a milestone of 1.5 million in 2007". This PSA target was part of the wider objective to "tackle the adult skills gaps", by increasing the number of adults with the skills required for employability and progression to higher levels of training. The rationale behind the Skills for Life strategy was to make Britain a more equal society and ‘close the gap’ by addressing issues that include area and neighbourhood deprivation, and educational attainment.

== See also ==
- T levels
- Further education
- National Careers Service
- National Apprenticeship Service
- Lifelong learning
- Adult education
