= Raising of school leaving age in England and Wales =

Raising of the school leaving age in England and Wales
- Initial: 1880
- Latest: 2017
- Related Acts: 1. Elementary Education Act 1870; 2. Elementary Education Act 1880; 3. Education Act 1918; 4. Education Act 1944; 5. Education and Skills Act 2008
- See raising of school leaving age for worldwide overview

The raising of school leaving age is the term used by the United Kingdom government for changes of the age at which a person is allowed to leave its compulsory education phase in England and Wales as specified under an Education Act.

In England and Wales, this age has been raised on several occasions since the introduction of universal compulsory education in 1880. Many of the increases in the 19th, 20th and 21st centuries were intended to generate more skilled labour by giving more time for pupils to gain skills and qualifications. Education was initially made compulsory for 5- to 10-year-olds in 1880. The leaving age was increased to 11 in 1893, 12 in 1899, 14 in 1918, 15 in 1947 and 16 in 1972.

In England (but not in Wales), provisions were added in 2015 which require those above the school leaving age (16) to either be in full-time (or part-time) work, or enrolled in further education, such as college or university (between the ages of 16 and 18).

== Overview ==
Changes to education leaving age in England and Wales
Age	England	Wales	Notes
10	1880		See Elementary Education Act 1880
11	1893		
12	1899		
13	1918		See Education Act 1918
14	1918		See Education Act 1918
15	1947		See Education Act 1944
16	1972		
17	2013	n/a	See Education and Skills Act 2008
18	2015	n/a	See Education and Skills Act 2008

== 19th century ==
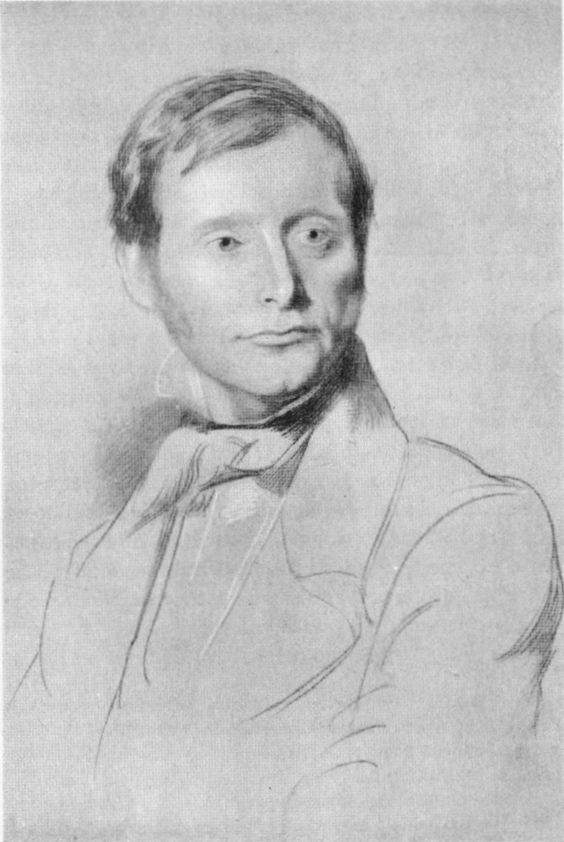
William Edward Forster drafted the first Education Act in 1870.

The Elementary Education Act 1870 (commonly known as 'Forster's Education Act' after its drafter William Edward Forster) applied only to England and Wales. It introduced the concept of compulsory education for children under thirteen, although the decision to do so was at the discretion of school boards; education was compulsory in approximately 40% of schools by 1873. In areas where education was considered a problem, elected school boards could be set up. These boards could, at their discretion, create local by-laws, confirmed by Parliament, to require attendance and fine the parents of children who did not attend. There were exemptions for illness, living more than a certain distance (typically one mile) from a school, or certification of having reached the required standard (which varied by board) which were made mandatory across England and Wales by the 1880 act.

The Elementary Education Act 1880 imposed compulsory attendance from 5–10 years. Ensuring that children of poorer families attended school proved difficult, as it was more tempting to send them working if the opportunity to earn extra income was available. Attendance officers could visit the homes of children who failed to attend school, but this often proved to be ineffective. Children under the age of 13 who were employed were required to have a certificate to show they had reached the educational standard; employers of these children who were not able to show this were penalised. An act brought into force thirteen years later went under the name of the Elementary Education (School Attendance) Act 1893, which stated a raised minimum leaving age to 11. Later the same year, the act was also extended for blind and deaf children, who previously had no means of an official education. This act was later amended in 1899 to raise the school leaving age to 12.

== 20th century ==
From 1900, the Board of Education wanted all children to remain at school until the age of 14 but continued to allow most children to leave school at 13 or sometimes 12-years-old through local by-laws. Many working-class parents did not see education beyond basic literacy and numeracy as relevant to their children's economic futures. A focus of concern among educationalists during this period was the idea that young boys leaving school were forsaking apprenticeships in exchange for "dead-end" jobs which were higher paid in the short term but had little opportunity for advancement. It was feared that these boys would become unemployable. There were also moralist concerns that children were gaining too much independence from adult authority at too young an age. School boards were abolished in 1902 and replaced with local education authorities.

=== Interwar period ===
In 1918 education was made compulsory between the ages of 5 and 14, with some exemptions. The year 1918 saw the introduction of the Education Act 1918, which was devised by H. A. L. Fisher and known as the Fisher Act. The act enforced compulsory education from 5–14 years, but also included provision for compulsory part-time education for all 14- to 18-year-olds. There were also plans for expansion in tertiary education, by raising the participation age to 18, but cuts in public spending after World War I made this impractical. This is the first act which started the planning of provision for young people to remain in education until the age of 18. The 1918 act was not implemented until the further Education Act 1921 was passed.

In 1933, the House of Commons debated a bill that proposed raising the leaving age to 15 in order to regulate how many children were moving into employment after leaving school. Following the war, the birth rate steadily increased and in 1920 had reached the highest it had ever been in the country's history. It then subsequently fell, meaning that in 1933, a considerable number of children were due to leave school, while far fewer were entering school at the early ages. Estimates suggested that nearly half a million children could have been available for employment by 1937, up from 55,000 in 1934. The proposed bill made a provision for exemptions which would have allowed local education authorities, under appropriate safeguards, to approve employment certificates where suitable work was found, with conditions on hours that could be worked. Sir Percy Harris claimed the measure would contribute positively to both education and employment alike without heavy financial burdens being imposed on taxpayers.

=== Butler's post-war education changes ===
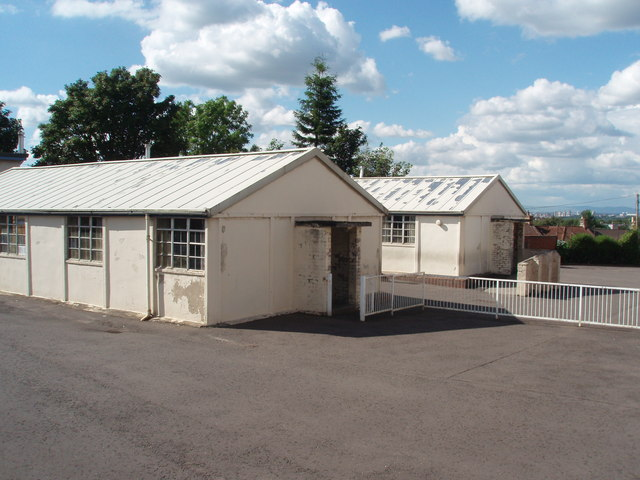
HORSA Huts, constructed c. 1947 to handle the increased student numbers as a result of the leaving age increase

In 1944, Rab Butler introduced the Education Act 1944 which raised the school leaving age to 15. In accordance with contemporary education doctrine, the Tripartite System was also introduced around this time. Because of the effects of World War II the act was not implemented until April 1947. This act also recommended compulsory part-time education for all children until the age of 18, but was dropped to cut spending after World War II.

The comprehensive school system has since replaced the Tripartite System brought in by this act across most of England.

==== Reasons ====
Changes in government approaches towards education meant that it was no longer regarded as adequate for a child to leave education aged 14, as that is the age when they were seen to really understand and appreciate the value of education, as well as being the period when adolescence was at its height. It was beginning to be seen as the worst age for a sudden switch from education to employment, with around 80% of children in 1938 leaving education at this age, many having only had primary-school level education. Although there were concerns about the effects of having less labour from these children, it was hoped that the outcome of a larger quantity of more qualified, skilled workers would eliminate the deficit problem from the loss of unskilled labour.

==== Effects ====
The 11+ examination was introduced in the 1940s to determine if a child should be eligible for a grammar school, secondary modern or technical college, under the Tripartite System, but has since been phased out across the majority of the United Kingdom, with just several boroughs in England and Northern Ireland still using it.

=== Leaving age raised to 16 ===
In March 1959, Minister of Education David Eccles MP sought to consider the education problems of young people between the ages of 15 and 18. It was felt that emphasis was needed on unfulfilled promises of the Education Act 1944, in particular the raising of the school leaving age to 16 and creating county colleges for mandatory part-time attendance up to the age of 18. It was understood that an additional year of schooling "should offer new and challenging courses" instead of just being a continuation of what had been taught before. At this time, half of the National Service recruits into the army who were in the two highest rated ability groups had left school at 15. As a separate matter, the three separate leaving dates which were in place at the time was believed to have "unfortunate consequences", although ideas to combine this to a single leaving date were rejected as it was felt that this may create difficulties for school leavers trying to find employment.

In 1964, preparations began to raise the school leaving age to 16. These were delayed in 1968, and eventually the decision was taken in 1971 that the new upper age limit be enforced from 1 September 1972 onwards. As well as raising the school leaving age in 1972, the year also saw the introduction of the Education (Work Experience) Act 1972, allowing LEAs to organise work experience for the additional final year school students. In some counties around the country, these changes also led to the introduction of middle schools in 1968, where students were kept at primary or junior school for an additional year, meaning that the number of students in secondary schools within these areas remained virtually constant through the change. In others, more radical changes led to middle schools for pupils aged up to 13 opening in smaller secondary school buildings, with other schools accommodating students over 13. By 2010, there were fewer than 300 middle schools across England, in just 22 local education authorities; the number of remaining middle schools has gradually fallen since the mid-1980s.

==== ROSLA buildings ====
For secondary schools which still took children from the age of 11, accommodating the new 5th year students was going to be a challenge. A popular solution was to provide those schools with a pre-fabricated building (often referred to as ROSLA buildings or ROSLA blocks - 'Raising of School Leaving Age'), providing them with the space for a full year of fifth year students. This solution proved popular, not only due to the low cost involved for materials and construction, but also the speed which these buildings could be erected. Many were supplied by F. Pratten and Co Ltd.

The ROSLA buildings were delivered in self-assembly packs and then assembled, often within days, regardless of weather conditions. They were not intended to stand long-term, though some have stood much longer than was intended. Many ROSLA buildings shared similar exterior attributes, the only difference being the separation of rooms within the building. The room separation within the building was decided upon locally after construction, with many internal walls being non-structural. Mobile classrooms were also added to many primary and secondary schools.

Other new secondary schools were formed by mergers during the 1970s, as comprehensive schools gradually replaced secondary modern and grammar schools. Some of these schools operated across the sites of both former schools, normally as a temporary measure until adequate classroom space was available at one site.

The majority of schools have long since replaced their ROSLA buildings with permanent structures.

=== Education Act 1996 ===
Between 1976 and 1997, the earliest leaving dates were:

- A child whose sixteenth birthday falls in the period 1 September to 31 January inclusive, may leave compulsory schooling at the end of the Spring term (the following Easter).
- A child whose sixteenth birthday falls in the period 1 February to 31 August, may leave on the Friday before the last Monday in May.

Those leaving at the end of the spring term would typically not sit their CSE or O-level exams, in which case would leave school with no formal qualifications.

Under the Education Act 1996, a new single school leaving date for all pupils was set for 1998 and all subsequent years. This was set as the last Friday in June in the school year which the child reaches the age of 16.

== 21st century ==
=== England ===
==== Education Reform Act 2006 ====
Graph showing the percentage of young people in employment or training, at ages 16 and 18, respectively

Reports published in November 2006 suggested that Education Secretary Alan Johnson was exploring ways to raise the school leaving age in England to 18, just over 40 years later than the last rise in 1972, pointing to the decline in unskilled jobs and the need for young people to be equipped for modern day employment.

===== Participation age =====
A year later, on 6 November 2007, Prime Minister Gordon Brown unveiled the government's plans in the Queen's Speech. The plans included the duty for parents to assist their children in education or training participation until the date of their 18th birthday, as well as detailing proposed moves to reform the apprenticeship system and to improve achievement for children in care. The Education and Skills Act 2008, when it came into force in the 2013 academic year, initially required participation in some form of education or training until the school year in which the child turned 17, followed by the age being raised to the young person's 18th birthday in 2015. This was referred to as raising the "participation age" to distinguish it from the school leaving age which remained at 16. To qualify as participation the young person must be in education or training for the equivalent of one day a week (at a minimum). The local council is responsible for ensuring that a suitable place is available.

===== Reasons =====
Figures were published in June 2006 showing that 76.2% of all young people aged 16–18 were already in further education or training, meaning that the rise would only affect around 25% of young people who may have otherwise sought employment immediately upon finishing compulsory education. This did not specifically state that young people would remain in secondary school, but rather by law be required to continue their education full or part-time, whether that be in sixth form, college or work based training. At the time of the original proposals, 80% of 16-year-olds stayed in full-time academic or vocational education, or go on a government-financed training course. In a survey of 859 people, 9/10 supported the plans for the age increase.

Proportion of 16–18 year olds in education & training, employment and NEET

A report published by the DfES showed that although there were around 70% of 16-year-olds who remained in full-time education, this declined to less than 50% by the time they reached 18, with the majority finding unskilled employment and even fewer going into employment where their training had relevance. There is also a small increase in those who become unemployed by the time they reached 18, which the government hoped to reduce with the act. It is these cases of unemployment which the government believed to be the toughest, those not in education, employment or training ("NEET"). In 2006 an additional 7% of 16 year olds fell into this category and the proportion rose to 13% among 18 year olds. In practice, only 1% of young people were classified as NEET during their time aged 16–18, due to churn between training, employment and NEET classification.

The government cited statistics suggesting that the number of unskilled jobs available had fallen from 8 million in the 1960s to 3.5 million by 2007, with predictions of a further drop to 600,000 predicted by 2020. They believed that the extension of compulsory education until the age of 18 would mean many more young people would leave education in a much better position to find skilled employment. Speaking in March 2007, Chancellor Gordon Brown stated that around 50,000 teenagers would be paid a training allowance to sign up to college-based courses, with estimates on the available number of apprenticeships available to double to around 500,000 by 2020, with 80% being available in England, which would be an increase from the current 250,000 apprenticeships available, offered by 130,000 employers.

===== Opposition =====
Whilst the government was eager to implement the changes, many opposed the proposals, some on civil liberties grounds. Compulsory school attendance is usually justified by reference to the argument that minors are incapable of making sufficiently reasoned choices. However, the 16–18 age group falls into a grey area, being regarded as effectively adult in a number of contexts but having extra restrictions and protections placed on their lives in other situations.

The proposal of using criminal sanctions to enforce attendance under this new system was opposed by MPs from both the Conservatives and the Liberal Democrats, who believed compulsion and threats were the wrong approach to increasing participation. A spokesperson for the DfES said the proposals were not about "forcing young people to do something they don't want to", and that "we are letting young people down if we allow them to leave education and training without skills at the age of 16." However, the Queen's Speech in November 2007, which discussed the raise in school leaving age, suggested that pupils who failed to comply with new laws would be expected to face fines or community service, rather than custodial sentencing which had previously been proposed. Local Authorities would also be expected to ensure pupils are participating up to 18 years of age.

===== Effects =====
A skills commission report released in 2013, backed by Labour MP Barry Sheerman, suggested that young people were being let down by the education system, with particular criticism aimed towards the lack of information, advice and guidance available to 14-19 year olds. The government was hopeful that the changes would have an effect of preventing crime, as figures reported a substantial percentage of young people leaving school were turning to a life of crime, with many being unable to find suitable work due to lack of skills and qualifications.

In 2015 the percentage of 16–18 classified as NEET fell to 7.5%, the lowest figure since 2000. Statistics for 2021 suggested that 91.5 of 16- and 17-year-olds in England were in full time education or an apprenticeship, 4.4% in other training and 5% NEET. A 2020 report suggested that the percentage of 16- to 17-year-olds in the UK in any kind of paid employment had fallen from 48.1% in 1997-99 to 25.4% in 2017-19.

=== Wales ===
The creation of the National Assembly for Wales in 1999 began an era of greater diversion in education policy between Wales and England. The 2008 Education and Skills Act gave the Assembly the powers to make similar reforms as those planned in England. A spokesperson for the Welsh Assembly indicated that it would want to encourage more young people to stay in education, but without compulsion, so school leavers there are not required to continue with any education or training. According to statistics republished in a BBC article in 2020, about 10% of young people in Wales aged 16 to 18 were not in education, employment or training. The equivalent figure for England in 2019 was 6.6%.

== See also ==
- School leaving age
  - Raising of school leaving age
- Newsom Report
- Education in England
- Education in Wales
- Compulsory education
- Tripartite System
