= Elementary school (England and Wales) =

Historical type of school

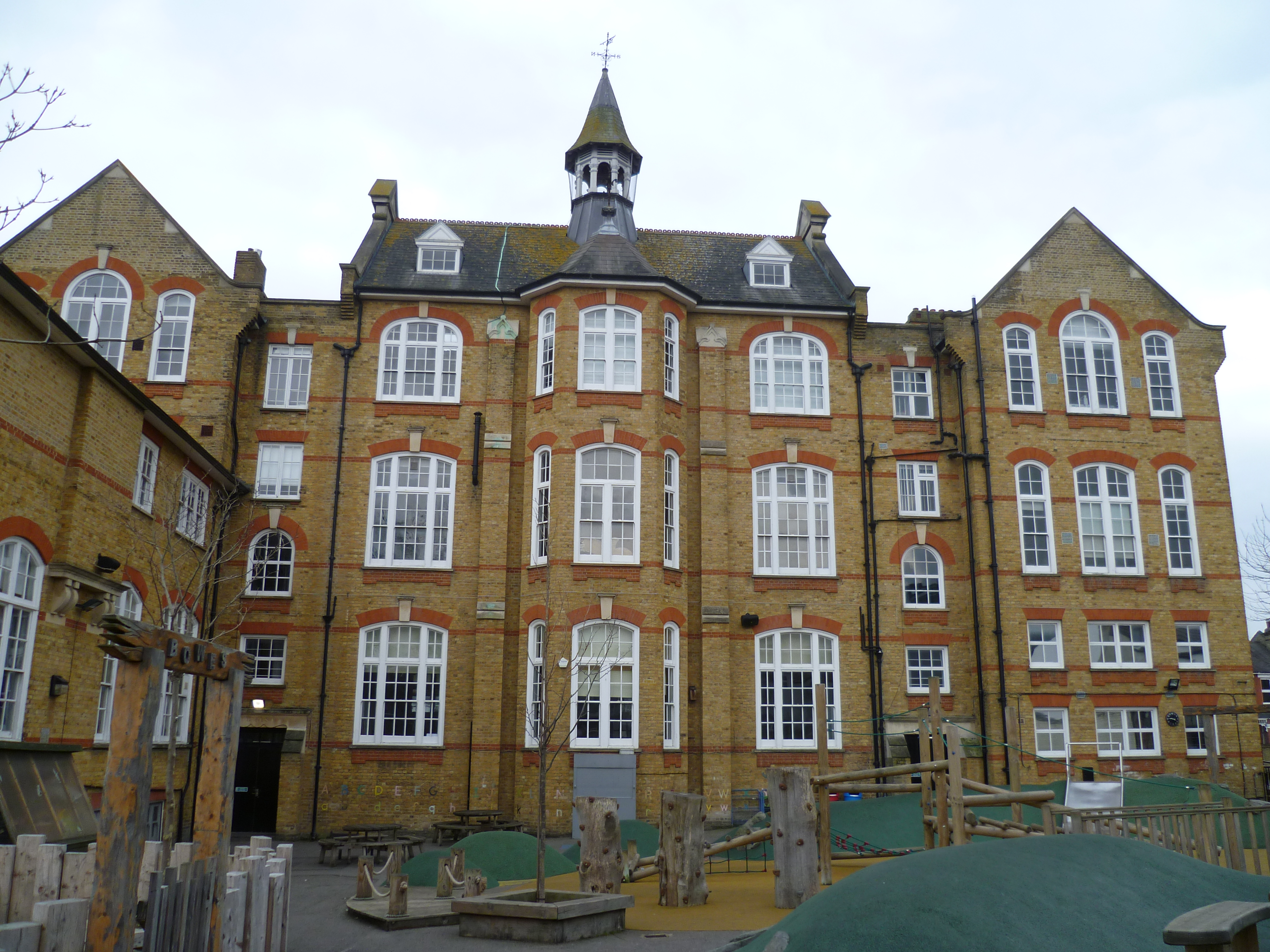
Bowes Road School, which opened in 1901, is a typical "three decker" urban elementary school in the Queen Anne style.

Elementary schools were the first schools in England and Wales intended to give a basic education to the children of working class families. At the start of the 19th century, the only schooling available to these young people was run by private concerns or by charities, and was often of a very poor standard. In the first decades of that century, a network of elementary schools was established by societies backed by the Christian churches. In an effort to expand this "voluntary" system, the government made grants available to these societies, initially for new school buildings but later towards their running costs. It became apparent that although this system worked reasonably well in rural communities, it was far less successful in the rapidly expanding industrial cities, and that Britain was falling behind the rest of the developed world. In 1870, an act of parliament established elected school boards throughout England and Wales, which were empowered to create secular "board schools" funded by local taxation where there was no provision by the church societies. Further legislation made school attendance compulsory, and eventually free of charge. The problem of how the education of older pupils should be managed was solved by abolishing school boards in 1902 and passing responsibility to local councils. Elementary schools were eventually replaced in 1944 by the system of primary and secondary education.

== History ==
=== Background ===
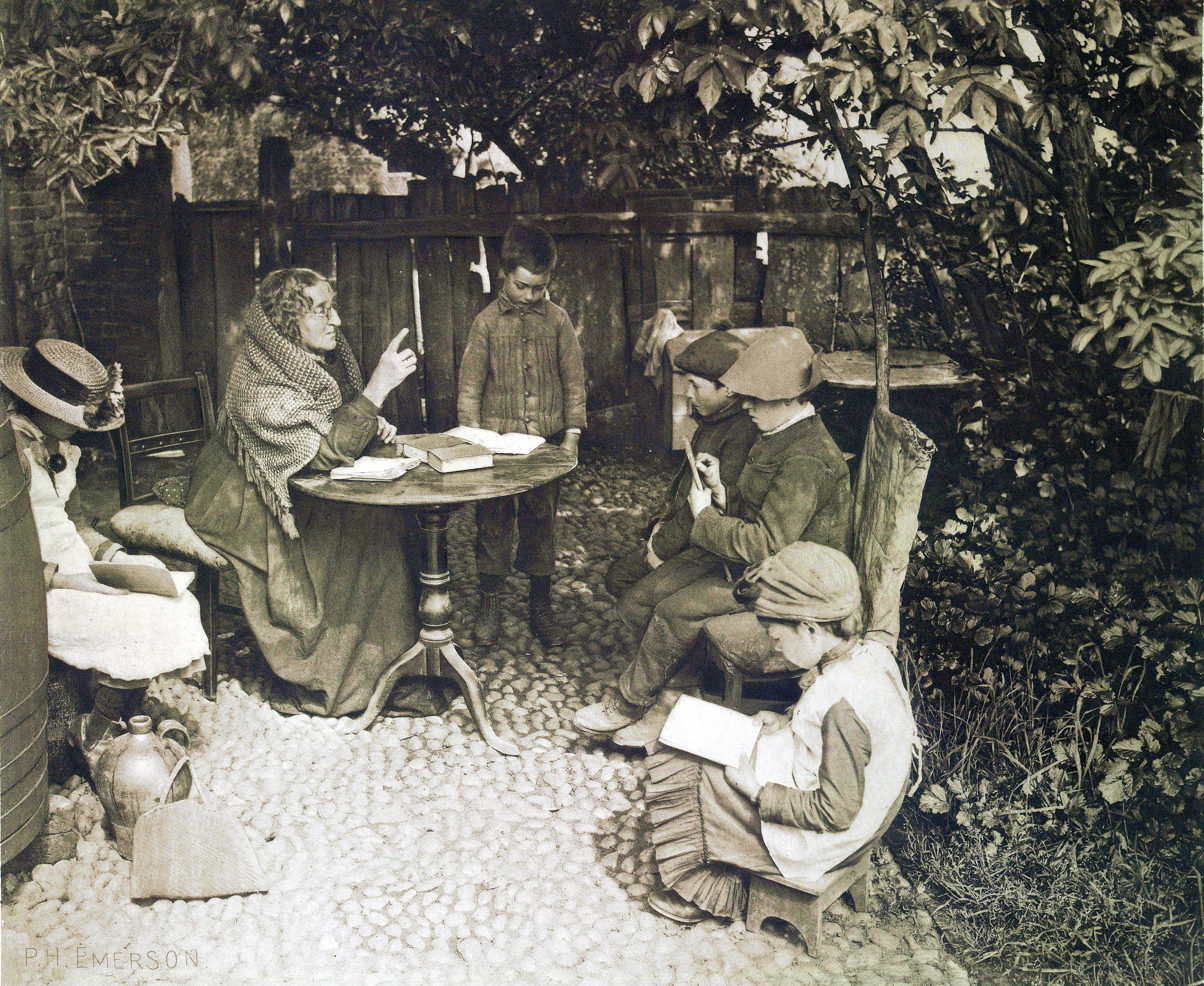
A Dame School lesson in a fisherman's yard in East Anglia in 1887.

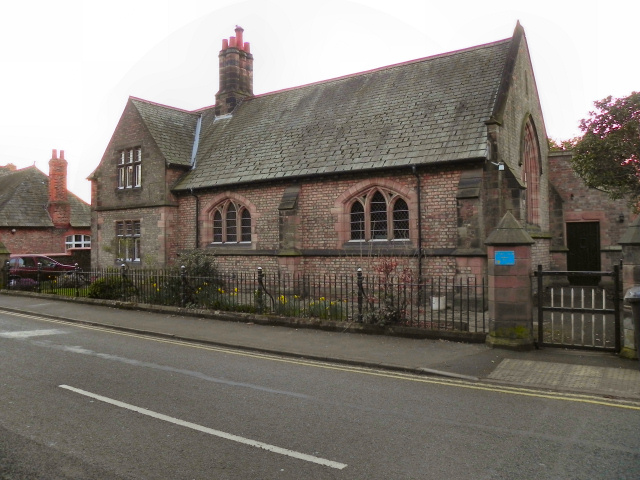
The former National School in the village of Walton, Cheshire, founded in 1837.

At the start of the 19th century, parents of the middle and upper classes could afford to pay for tuition of their children by a governess or tutor at home, or at a private school. For the working classes, private schools existed which charged modest fees but provided only the most basic education, while charity schools offered subsidised or free places, but there were few of them. Many working class children worked for a living on farms or in factories from an early age, but had the chance to learn to read at a Sunday school run by their local church, which had become popular from the 1780s. But some children were so destitute that they were not welcomed even at Sunday schools, and free charitable schools, known as ragged schools, were established to provide for them from the 1840s. Working-class children under the age of 7 could be cared for at private dame schools, which were usually located in the home of the teacher, generally an older woman who was unfit for other work and was often barely literate herself. However, this type of schooling was popular with parents and continued long after better provision was available.

In 1811, the Church of England founded the National Society for Promoting Religious Education, which began founding schools, known as National schools, that focussed on Anglican religious education, but also provided a grounding in basic literacy and numeracy. In 1814, the British and Foreign School Society also began to open schools for the children of Nonconformist Protestants and other Christians, known as British schools. The Methodist and Roman Catholic churches also established schools in the following decades. Together, these schools were referred to as "voluntary schools".

=== Early government intervention ===
In 1820, Whig Party reformer Henry Brougham introduced an Education Bill to parliament, which would have resulted in schools being subsidised through the rates, a local property tax. The bill failed for a number of reasons; Anglicans feared excessive secular control of their schools, Nonconformist feared Anglican control and manufacturers feared the loss of their child workforce. In 1833, the government established a system of grants to the voluntary schools for the construction of new school buildings, the first time that government money had been committed to education. A grant could be claimed only if half the cost could be met by voluntary donations; a system that worked in rural areas where a wealthy landowner could be persuaded to underwrite a village school, but which often left industrial urban areas with no provision at all. In the same year, the Factory Act 1833 prevented the employment of children under 9 years-old and required that children aged 9 to 13 years should receive two hours of education each weekday. Where this requirement was actually observed, factory owners often appointed a semi-literate worker as a teacher, although a few employers established well-run schools. An 1837 Select Committee of the House of Commons was appointed "to consider the best means of providing useful education for the children of the Poorer Classes". It reported in the following year that, for instance, in Leeds, only one child in 41 was receiving an education "likely to be useful", and concluded that:

The kind of education given to the children of the working classes is lamentably deficient... it extends (bad as it is) to but a small proportion of those who ought to receive it. (Report from the Select Committee on Education of the Poorer Classes in England and Wales (1838) vii–viii)

— Simon, Brian, The Two Nations and the Educational Structure, 1780–1870 (1974)

=== 1839 Education Committee ===
The result of the 1837 Select Committee was the establishment of the Committee of the Privy Council on Education in April 1839 to administer the education grants under the direction of Dr James Kay-Shuttleworth. The committee began inquiries into how building grants had been spent and introduced grants for school furniture and equipment, provided that the recipients submitted to a regime of inspection. The churches were openly hostile to government oversight and the committee was forced to allow them to approve the inspectors that they appointed. Several education acts followed to regulate the grant system and allowing maintenance grants for schools in poorer areas.

=== 1859 Newcastle Commission ===
The title page of the 1861 report of the Newcastle Commission.

In 1858, a Royal Commission on the State of Popular Education in England was appointed under the chairmanship of the Duke of Newcastle. In its report published in 1861, the commission found that of the 2,655,767 school-aged children in England and Wales, 2,213,694 were children of the "poorer classes" and thus unlikely to be tutored at home. Of these poorer children, 573,536 were attending private schools, which evidence showed were unlikely to be providing a useful education. Of the 1,549,312 children whose names were on the books of voluntary elementary schools, 786,202 attended for less than 100 days per year, while only 20 per cent of them remained in school after their 11th birthday. 120,305 children received no schooling at all. It was also found that "the instruction given is commonly both too ambitious and too superficial in its character... and that it often omits to secure a thorough grounding in the simplest but most essential parts of instruction".

The recommendations of the commission were that infant schools for under 7-year-olds should be attached to existing elementary schools; also that annual grants to schools should be dependent on the pupils' achievements, to be assessed by school inspectors. The commission rejected the proposal for compulsory school attendance on the grounds that:

...if the wages of the child's labour are necessary, either to keep the parents from the poor rates, or to relieve the pressure of severe and bitter poverty, it is far better that it should go to work at the earliest age at which it can bear the physical exertion than that it should remain at school.

Furthermore, the commission, while noting that "all the principal nations of Europe, and the United States of America, as well as British North America, have felt it necessary to provide for the education of the people by public taxation", rejected the proposition of fully publicly funded schools in England and Wales because "the interference of Government with education is objectionable on political and religious grounds".

=== 1862 Revised Code ===
As a result of the Newcastle Report, the Committee of Education introduced a grant scheme based on Payment by Results. In a scheme devised by Robert Lowe, a grant was payable for each pupil, depending on their attendance and ability in "the three Rs"; reading, writing and arithmetic. A simple table of attainment for each age-group or "standard" was laid down by the committee and assessed by school inspectors who conducted an annual test at each school.

=== Board schools ===
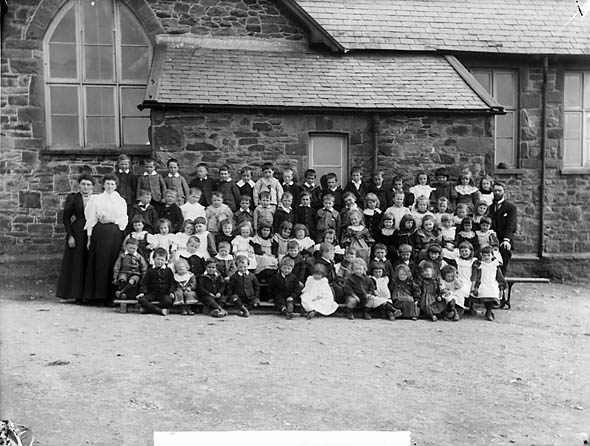
The pupils and staff of the St Davids Board School in Pembrokeshire, circa 1885.

When the Reform Act 1867 extended the vote to all male householders, it was realised that better provision was needed for the education of the working classes and a number of influential pressure groups were formed to force the government to act; although whether the voluntary schools should be further empowered or the state should take control of all schooling, was furiously debated. Liberal MP William Edward Forster submitted an education bill to parliament in February 1870 which tried to balance the demands of the various factions. In its final form, the bill allowed the voluntary schools to continue to receive grants, but that directly elected local school boards would establish schools, funded from the local rates, where there was no voluntary provision, so that there would be sufficient places for every child. On the contentious subject of religious education, it was finally agreed that it should be taught in the new board schools without favouring any particular Christian denomination and that parents would have the right to withdraw their children from religious instruction classes if they chose.

The Elementary Education Act 1870 (33 & 34 Vict. c. 75), which became law on 9 August, while making provision for the education of all children aged between 5 and 13 years-old, did not make education free of charge, except where a school board found that a parent would be unable to pay the weekly fee. Also, purely on the grounds of logistics, there was no compulsion for children to attend school, because the buildings to accommodate them all had not yet been built, although the act did empower school boards to make local byelaws making attendance compulsory, if they had the capacity to do so.

Voluntary church schools would continue to receive a maintenance grant of up to 50%, but from six months after the introduction of the Act, there would be no grants for new buildings. In that short period, 2,500 requests for building grants were made for new church schools. A similar number of new board schools were created in England and Wales between 1870 and 1896. The Elementary Education Act 1880 finally forced all school boards to enact compulsory schooling byelaws and withdrew the option to leave school with a certificate allowing employment in a factory at the age of ten.

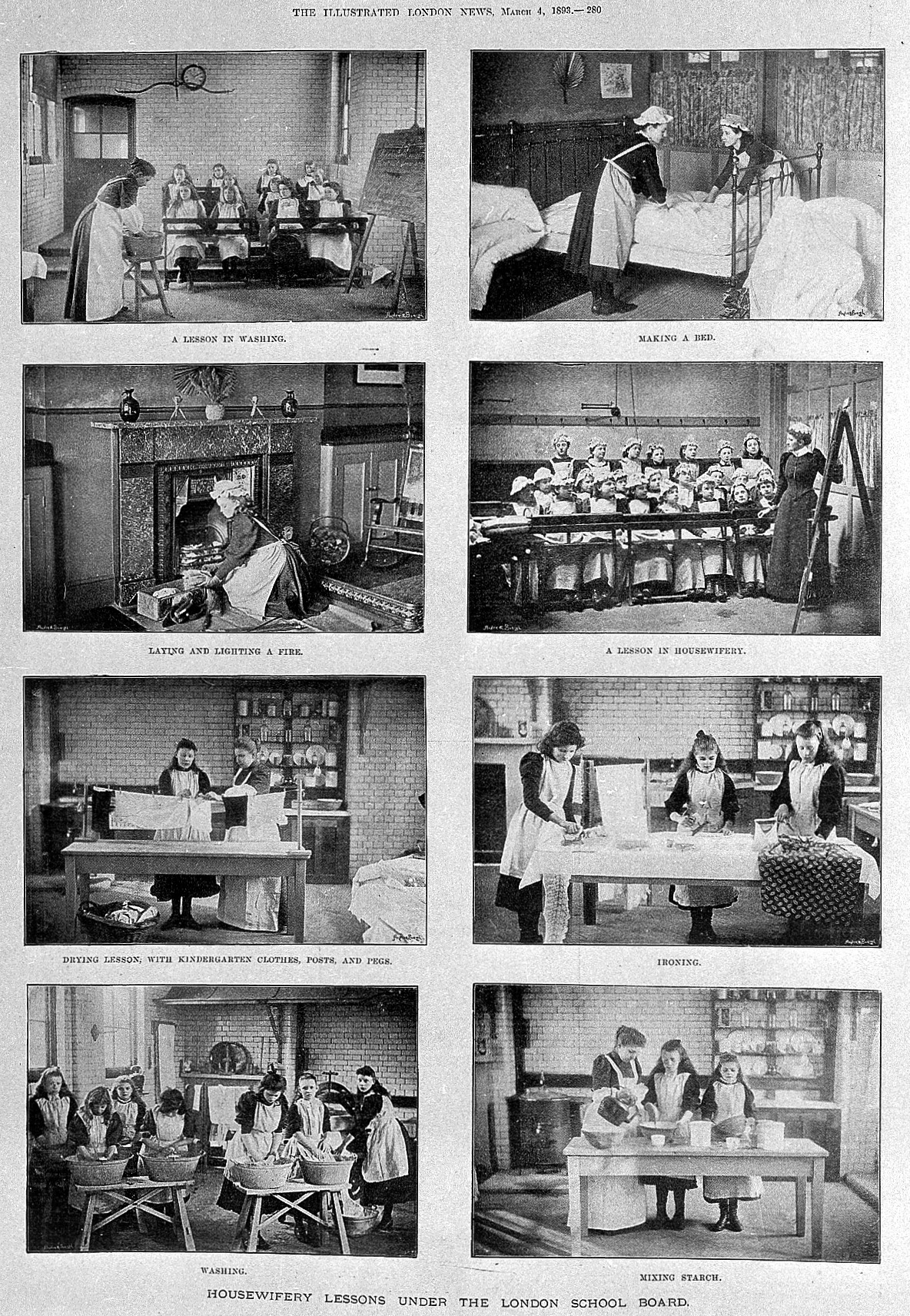
Domestic science lessons for London board school girls in 1883; a result of the broadened curriculum allowed by the Mundella Code.

The driving force behind the 1880 Act was Liberal MP A. J. Mundella, the Vice-President of the Committee of the Council on Education. In 1882, his new Code of Education, known as the "Mundella Code", replaced the old Revised Code and broadened the curriculum to encompass "a proper variety of mental employment and of physical exercise" including the teaching of sciences and arts. In infant schools, "play and manual employments" were introduced, and at the other end of the age range, a broader curriculum for the children who were now staying longer in school. Within the following decade, elementary schools were providing: singing, recitation, drawing, English, geography, science, history and domestic economy. In some cases schools could provide for older pupils: mechanics, chemistry, physics, animal physiology, agriculture, navigation, languages and shorthand. Boys could be taught vocational subjects such as gardening and woodwork, while for girls there was needlework, cookery, laundry and dairy work. Physical exercise could including swimming and gymnastics, and there were educational visits. The "object lesson" was a widely used method of teaching sciences, based on the theories of Heinrich Pestalozzi; an object, natural or manufactured, was brought into the classroom and while the children were allowed to examine it, the teacher would explain its function and origin.

Following a campaign by the growing Labour movement, the Elementary Education Act 1891 made it possible for elementary schooling to be free of charge, although many board and voluntary schools continued to charge fees until the Education Act 1918 finally abolished fees in state funded schools and raised the leaving age to 14 years.

=== Local education authorities ===
The issue of providing education for children over the age of 12 highlighted the need for reform of the school boards, who by the end of the 19th century had begun to run "higher classes" and even separate "higher elementary schools" for more capable older pupils. This was sometimes in direct competition with local borough and county councils who ran technical and arts schooling for the same age groups. Following a court case in 1899, the Cockerton Judgement ruled that school boards were exceeding their powers by educating this older age group. The Education Act 1902 replaced the directly elected school boards and made the local councils Local Education Authorities (LEAs) with the power to run secondary and technical schools. A controversial clause was that the LEAs were required to give maintenance grants to church schools and to control their curriculum; however, if a church wished to provide denominational teaching, then they would have to maintain the school themselves, an option adopted by the Catholic Church.

=== End of the elementary schools ===
Following the First World War, the government commissioned William Henry Hadow to head a committee which would investigate and make recommendations on a wide range of educational issues; their findings were issued in stages over almost a decade and were known as the Hadow Reports. In 1931, the Haddow Committee issued a report recommending the division of schooling into distinct primary and secondary sections. Within the primary sector, infant schools and junior schools for 7 to 11-year-olds should be separate but cooperate closely together. Further advice on infant schooling was issued in a report of 1933. These recommendations were later adopted as part of the wide-ranging reforms of the Education Act 1944. Many of the former elementary school buildings became primary schools, while others were repurposed as secondary modern schools, for which they were poorly suited.

== Architecture ==
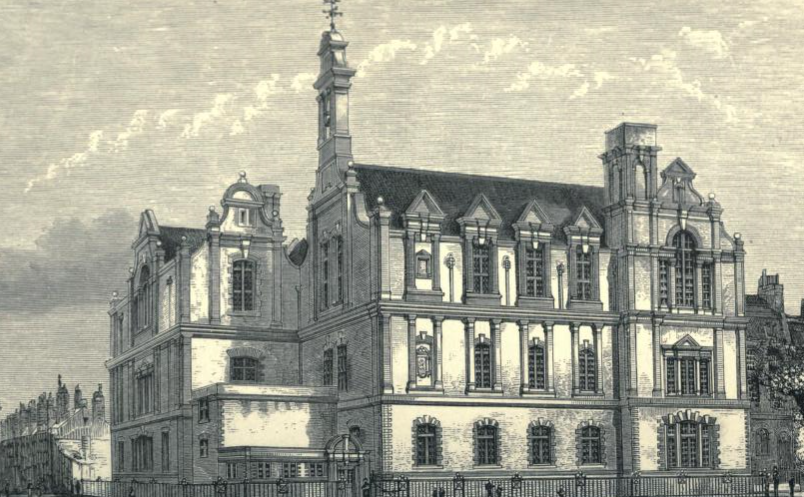
West Street School, London Fields; an elementary school designed by architect Edward Robert Robson for the London School Board in 1874

The earliest elementary schools followed the monitorial system and only required a large space in which desks could be arranged in rows accommodating between 50 and 100 children; a National Society report of 1816 stated that "a barn furnishes no bad model". The move towards smaller classes and the need in urban areas to accommodate up to 1,500 pupils on as small a site as possible led to the development of schools of three storeys, with classrooms leading directly onto a large hall on each floor, eliminating the need for poorly lit and ventilated corridors. Generally, the infants (under 7's) occupied the ground floor while the older boys and girls had one of the upper floors each, with separate entrances and staircases so that there could be no undesirable mixing of the sexes.

The first of these "three-decker" elementary schools was built in Fulham in 1873 by architect Basil Champneys in the newly fashionable Queen Anne style. This pioneering design was championed by Edward Robert Robson, who was appointed architect to the London School Board in 1871 and who extolled its virtues in his influential book, School Architecture, published in 1874. The advantage of the Queen Anne style was that it saved the expense of the fussy decoration required for the popular Gothic Revival style and also emphasised the secular rather than religious function of these new buildings. Robson described his schools as "sermons in brick" while Arthur Conan Doyle enthused that they were "beacons of the future". Alternative designs were a building of two storeys for the older boys and girls, but with a separate building for infants, or with all three departments on the ground floor, which while more convenient and cheaper to construct, required a large plot of land.

== Organisation ==
=== Age groups and standardised testing ===
The first attempt to introduce a universal structure of age progression into schooling in England and Wales was in 1862. During the middle of the 19th century, there were concerns that government grants to schools were becoming increasingly expensive and the 1857 Newcastle Commission recommended that funding be based on results from academic testing. The 1862 "Revised Code" established that the issuing of government grants to schools would be based on attendance and the results of tests in reading, writing and arithmetic conducted by a visiting inspector annually. Children aged between six and twelve years old were grouped into six "standards" for each year of their schooling. The first standard covered six- to seven-year-olds, the second standard covered seven- to eight-year-olds and so forth up until sixth standard which covered eleven- to twelve-year-olds. Recommendations were issued for what level children should have reached by each standard though these came to be seen as an ideal which often couldn't be achieved in practise. Guidance was updated on several occasions and in 1882 a seventh standard was introduced. The system has been criticised for encouraging a narrow curriculum but praised for encouraging schools to focus on establishing basic academic skills rather than religion.

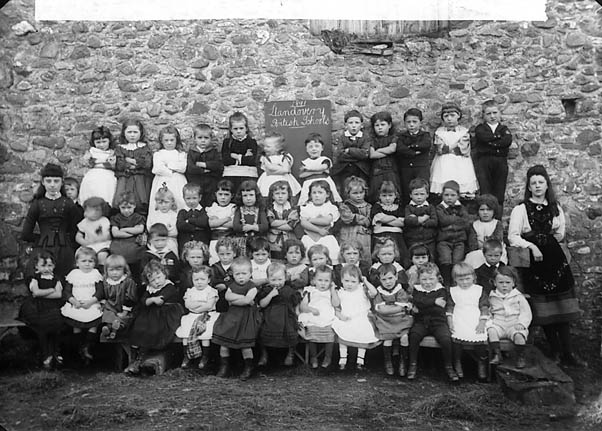
Infants class at a school in Llandovery, Carmarthenshire (1891)

Schools or school departments for younger children were known as infants schools. The school entrance age was formally set at five-years-old by the Elementary Education Act 1870 but infants schools would admit children aged two to seven years old, space permitting. Schools were expected to prepare children for the requirements of first standard but as the decades progressed they were also encouraged to cater to the specific needs of young children. One of the first examples of this was a government document from 1893 which encouraged infants schools to consider all aspects of children's development when designing their curriculum and by the interwar era infants schools had adopted a child-centred approach.

== See also ==
- Education in England
- Education in Wales
- Comprehensive school (England and Wales)
- Independent school (United Kingdom)
- State-funded schools (England)
