= Liberal welfare reforms =

Welfare state

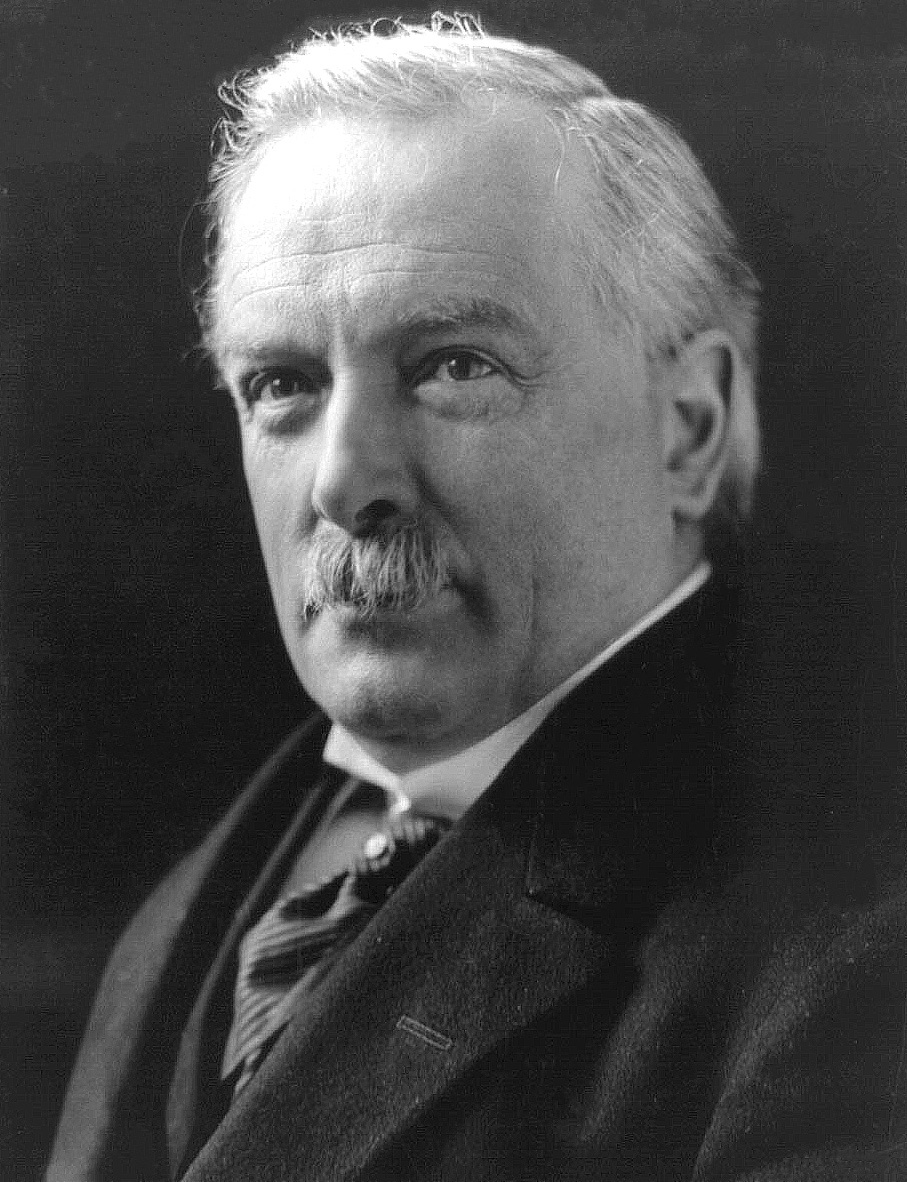
David Lloyd George was the key leader of the 'New Liberals' who passed welfare legislation

The Liberal welfare reforms (1906–1914) were a series of acts of social legislation in the United Kingdom passed by the Liberal Party after the 1906 general election. They represent the Liberal Party's transition rejecting the old laissez-faire policies and enacting interventionist state policies against poverty and thus launching the modern British welfare state. David Lloyd George and Winston Churchill led in designing and passing the reforms, and building nationwide support.

The historian G. R. Searle argues that the reforms had multiple causes, including "the need to fend off the challenge of Labour; pure humanitarianism; the search for electoral popularity; considerations of National Efficiency; and a commitment to a modernised version of welfare capitalism." By implementing the reforms outside the English Poor Laws, the stigma attached to a needy person obtaining relief was also removed. After 1911 Liberals turned to other issues, but never abandoned their support for the welfare programmes.

During the 1906 general election campaign, neither of the two major parties (the Liberals and the Conservatives) made poverty an important election issue and no promises were made to introduce welfare reforms. The Liberals, led first by Henry Campbell-Bannerman and later H. H. Asquith, won a landslide victory and began introducing wide-ranging reforms as soon as they took office.

== Previous social legislation ==
The Conservative government in office before the Liberals came to power passed the Unemployed Workmen Act 1905 (The Liberals, as noted by one study, did not oppose the bill that produced this legislation.) Slum housing was also cleared for new houses to be built. Much of this legislation was left for local authorities to implement – their attitudes affected whether legislation was fully implemented. The Conservatives passed the Education Act 1902 that provided funds for denominational religious instruction in Church of England and Roman Catholic schools. The Nonconformists, who formed a major Liberal constituency, were outraged at the help to their theological enemies, but failed to repeal it.

== Liberal reforms 1906–1914 ==
=== Licensing pubs ===
A favourite goal of Protestant nonconformists was to sharply reduce the heavy drinking by closing as many pubs as possible. Asquith—although a heavy drinker—took the lead in 1908 by proposing to close about one-third of the 100,000 pubs in England and Wales, with the owners compensated through a new tax on surviving pubs. The brewers controlled the pubs and organised a stiff resistance, supported by the Conservatives, who repeatedly defeated the proposal in the House of Lords. However, the "People's Tax" of 1910 included a stiff tax on pubs, and during the First World War, their hours were sharply restricted from about 18 hours a day to 5 1/2. Beer and alcohol consumption fell in half from 1900 to 1920, in part because there were many new leisure opportunities.

=== Education ===
Children were provided with free school meals from 1906 onwards; via the Education (Provision of Meals) Act 1906. However, many local councils ignored this system, as it was not compulsory for them to provide the free meals and the cost to the council was far greater than was subsidised for. The provision of free school meals was made compulsory in 1914, in which year fourteen million meals per school day were served (compared with nine million per school day in 1910), most of which were free. In 1912, half of all councils in Britain were offering the scheme. Recruitment for the Second Boer War demonstrated the undernourishment and illness among the working classes, and there were fears over future generations being unable to maintain military control of Britain's empire. Also, following an unfavourable report by the Board of Education's inspectors on infant education in 1906, school provision for children under five was restricted (previously, the normal age for the entry of working-class children into full-time education had been three).

In 1906 a major education bill failed to pass, to the annoyance of Nonconformists Protestants who were angry that since the Education Act 1902 local rates were used to support Church of England schools. Liberals sought to limit religious teaching in all schools to vague nondenominational Christianity (as already required in state schools under the Cowper-Temple Clause of the Elementary Education Act 1870). Under the proposal many Anglicans and Catholics would lose the right to use their schools to teach their religion to their children. The House of Lords, where the Liberals were outnumbered 5 to 1, rewrote the bill to make it more favourable to the Anglicans, so no compromise was possible. The Nonconformists had been a major factor in the Liberal landslide of 1906, and they dominated the Liberal front bench. But the bitter defeat of their highest priority now became a factor in their loss of enthusiasm for the Liberal Party, and played a key role in its decline.

Nevertheless, a few uncontroversial minor education bills did become law. The Education (Administrative Provisions) Act 1907 introduced what became known as the Free Place System. The Regulations for Secondary Schools issued that year authorised the payment of a £5 per head grant for each pupil between the ages of 12 and 18, and schools had to conform to certain requirements in order to attain this grant. Schools could not restrict admission to pupils belonging to particular religious denominations, governing bodies had to be reconstituted to include a number of representative governors (some of whom represented the LEA), and at least 25% of the annual intake should be pupils from elementary schools. The act also provided local education authorities (LEAs) with the power to acquire land for constructing new secondary schools, which led to the coming into being of many county and municipal secondary schools.

In 1907 the number of free scholarship places in secondary schools was increased. If working-class pupils passed a scholarship examination, then their fees would be paid for them by the Local Education Authority. One-quarter of places in most secondary schools would be reserved for scholarship pupils. Bright working-class children were therefore provided with the opportunity to climb "the educational ladder", while for those pupils who failed the scholarship exam, some LEAs had "Central Schools" which provided a practically based curriculum for children between the ages of 11 and 15. Professional training was improved, while support was also provided for 150 schools for mothers, while classes in domestic economy were encouraged and grants were provided for day nurseries. I addition, the normal allowance for teachers was doubled under the Elementary School Teachers' Superannuation Act 1912, while the War Service Superannuation Act 1913 made war service (as noted by one study) “equivalent to teaching for superannuation entitlement.”

The Education (Scotland) Act 1908 enforced medical inspection, free books and travel, free meals and clothing grants, and some bursaries. The Irish Universities Act 1908 gave to Roman Catholics new higher education facilities which they had lacked for centuries. The Education (Choice of Employment) Act 1910 enabled local authorities to provide vocational guidance for school-leavers, with the Board of Education providing grants to authorities from 1911 onwards to carry out this purpose. By mid-1912, however, only forty-one local authorities had responded. The Public Libraries (Art Galleries in County Boroughs) (Ireland) Act 1911 empowered Dublin and other county councils to raise a half-penny rate for the support of art galleries, In 1913, the status of day technical classes was raised to that of junior technical schools. In 1914, an Elementary Education (Provision of Meals) Act was passed that legalised (as one study has noted) “the provision of meals during holidays and other days when the schools were not open” and also increased the expenditure limit on school meals.

=== Women and children ===
The Notification of Births Act 1907 sought to quantify and analyse the causes of (and ultimately further reduce) infant mortality while the Matrimonial Causes Act 1907 empowered courts to order divorced husbands to make unsecured payments to wives for their support and maintenance, while the Probation Act 1907 established a probation service to provide supervision within the community for young offenders as an alternative to prison. The Children and Young Persons Act 1908 formed part of the "Children's Charter" which imposed punishments for those neglecting children. It became illegal to sell children tobacco, alcohol and fireworks or to send children begging. Juvenile courts and borstals were created instead for young offenders so they did not have to stand in adult courts and go to adult prisons for most offences.

Medical inspections began in 1907 but many poor families could not afford the cost of the doctors fees to get treated; it was not until 1912 that medical treatment was provided. However, education authorities largely ignored the provision of free medical treatment for school children. Nevertheless, by 1914, 214 out of the (then) 317 local authorities were providing some kind of medical treatment for children. A tax allowance for children was introduced in 1909 to help families on low incomes. This allowance of £10 a year was introduced for every child below the age of 16 in the case of income tax payers whose income fell below £500 per annum (this rebate was later doubled in the 1914 budget).

Regulations introduced in 1907 for the manufacture of paints and colours prohibited women and young persons from manipulating lead colour (defined as any dry carbonate of lead, red lead or any colour containing either of these substances) and ordered monthly medical examinations of all employees engaged in a lead process. Regulations introduced that same year concerning the heading of yarn dyed by means of a lead compound prohibited the employment of young persons and prescribed the medical examination "of all workers in the process once every three months".

The Intestate Husband's Estate (Scotland) Act 1911 provided widows in Scotland with the same right as in England to a first charge of £500 on the property of her deceased husband if he died intestate, Regulations introduced in 1911 concerning the smelting of materials containing lead and the manufacture of red or orange lead and flaked litharge prohibited the employment of women and young persons in these processes and ordered monthly medical examinations of all employees.

=== Elderly ===
The Old Age Pensions Act 1908 introduced pensions for those over 70. They were paid 5s a week (estimates of the value of this in 2010 are difficult to ascertain, the average wage of a labourer being around 30s. a week) to single men and women; this sum could be collected at the local post office. In January 1910, 75% of Liberal candidates dwelt on pensions in their election addresses, making it, in the words of one historian, "one of the central Liberal themes of the election".

The pensions were means-tested (to receive the pension, one had to earn less than £31.50 annually) and intentionally low to encourage workers to make their own provisions for the future. An example of how low this amount was is that if an elderly person was to live on their pension alone they fell below Rowntree's poverty line. It was a struggle for elderly persons to claim their pension as they had to prove that they were not drunkards, for example. Also, to qualify for the pension scheme, they had to have worked to their "full potential". There were no fixed guidelines as to what "full potential" was, so people who had been briefly unemployed could be penalised. To be eligible, they also had to have lived in the country for 20 years or more, so many immigrants could not claim a pension, or British people who had worked abroad and returned to Britain to retire. Also, pensioners could not claim a pension if they had been to prison in the last 10 years. On 31 December 1908 a total of 596,038 pensions had been granted.

A later piece of pension legislation, the Old Age Pensions Act 1911, improved residency requirements for entitlement to pensions.

=== Workers ===
The Trade Disputes Act 1906 introduced a number of immunities for trade unions, while the Workmen's Compensation Act 1906 extended compensation for work-related injuries and diseases to an additional 6 million workers. The Merchant Shipping Act 1906 enhanced conditions for those working on ships, while the Factory and Workshop Act 1901 (1 Edw. 7. c. 22) was amended in 1906 to include laundries.

The Employers' Liability Insurance Companies Act 1907 (7 Edw. 7. c. 46) provided extra safeguards to workmen entitled to compensation under various existing laws. The Fatal Accidents (Damages) Act 1908 (8 Edw. 7. c. 7) provided that, according to one study, "in case of fatal accidents insurance money shall not be taken into account in assessing damages." The White Phosphorus Matches Prohibition Act 1908 (8 Edw. 7. c. 42) prohibited the usage of white phosphorus in the manufacture of matches. Improvements in conditions for postal workers and dockyard employees were made, while reductions in the standard working hours on certain railways were carried out following a 1907 agreement.

The Notice of Accidents Act 1906 (6 Edw. 7. c. 53) simplified and improved "the system of reporting accidents in mines, quarries, factories and workshops." The Police (Superannuation) Act 1906 (6 Edw. 7. c. 7) amended the law as to retirement from the police "in a manner advantageous to the Force and the individual policeman, while at the same time relieving the burden on the rates." The Employment of Women Act 1907 (7 Edw. 7. c. 10) repealed two unimportant provisions of the law "which allowed employment of women at night in a mine or factory to an extent inconsistent with the requirements of the International Convention on the subject" that had been signed by Great Britain and thirteen other States at Berne in 1906. In 1908 a shipbuilding programme for that year was accelerated to boost labour demand, while loans sanctioned by the Local Government Board since the early summer for 'works of public utility' (such as street improvements, waterworks, and sewerage) had exceeded £700,000. Spending on relief work and public works was also significantly increased to alleviate unemployment, while the Local Government Board regulations governing the type of work provided by distress committees and local authorities, together with the eligibility of applicants for relief, were both relaxed.

The Coal Mines Regulation Act 1908 introduced an eight-hour day for miners, and under the Labour Exchanges Act 1909 (9 Edw. 7. c. 7) labour exchanges were set up in order to help unemployed people find work, by providing centres where a large number of employers and the unemployed could post jobs and apply for them respectively. By February 1910 eighty-three labour exchanges were open, and proved to be invaluable in helping people find employment. In 1913, these labour exchanges were putting around 3,000 people into a job each day. Another measure taken was the 1909 Development Fund, which was an attempt to provide work in times of depression. This fund was devoted to increasing employment opportunities through measures such as afforestation and the provision of smallholdings in the countryside. In addition, the government encouraged the adoption of Fair Wages contracts by local authorities. New duties were introduced for staff administering existing Factory and Workshop Acts such as inspecting factories and docks under (as noted by one observer) “certain codes of special rules and regulations.” Various regulations were introduced in several trades aimed at protecting workers from disease or accident such as electricity, where in 1908 special regulations were made for electrical safety. In 1909, regulations concerning the grinding of metals and racing of grindstones were introduced in SR&O 1909/1155.

The Trade Boards Act 1909 (9 Edw. 7. c. 22) created boards to set minimum wage criteria that were legally enforceable. The main provision was to set minimum wages in certain trades with the history of low wages, because of surplus of available workers, the presence of women workers, or the lack of skills. At first it applied to four industries: chain-making, ready-made dresses. paper-box making, and the machine-made lace and finishing trade. About 70 per cent of their 200,000 workers were women. Trade Boards were later extended to include the coal industry under the Coal Mines (Minimum Wage) Act 1912.

The Police (Weekly Rest-Day) Act 1910 provided constables with one day of rest out of seven. The Mines Accidents (Rescue and Aid) Act 1910 (10 Edw. 7 & 1 Geo. 5. c. 15) provided for the availability of first aid treatment, rescue work, and fire precautions at mines, and that same year a central Road Board was established to fund improvements in road conditions, a measure made necessary by the new motor traffic. Upon its introduction the new Board began at once to enable the County Councils to begin tarring the surfaces of main roads.

The Shops Act 1911 gave a weekly half-day holiday to assistants, while the Factory Workshop (Cotton Cloth Factories) Act 1911 provided the Secretary of State with the power to make regulations to improve conditions in cotton cloth factories in relation to ventilation and humidity. In 1913 five additional wage boards were set up that covered hollow ware making, shirt making, sugar confectionery and food preserving, tin box making, and linen and cotton embroidery, along with a portion of the laundry industry. These extensions led to an additional 140,000 being covered by minimum wage legislation. The Trade Union Act 1913 clarified the legal position of trade unions while also restoring their political power, together with the financial position of the Labour Party.

Early in its term, the government’s record on labour legislation was positively commented on by future Labour Party leader Arthur Henderson who stated that

there remained to the credit of the Government an output of legislation benefiting the conditions of the millions they represented greater than had ever been accomplished in any previous session of Parliament.

=== Health and Welfare ===
The Housing of the Working Classes and Town Planning Act 1909, as noted by one study, "liberalized still further the terms of housing loans, increasing the proportion of money needed which could be lent and the time for repayment. Local authorities could borrow all or part of the money required from the Public Works Loan Commissioners for 60 years (80 for the land) and public utility societies could borrow two-thirds of the needed cash for 40 years In both cases the interest rate at that time was 3.5 per cent, but this depended on market fluctuations. Up to 1909 municipal housing had been optional. It now became obligatory where a shortage was judged to exist. The town planning powers conferred have had far-reaching results in preventing congestion in un- built-on areas."

The Alkali, &c. Works Regulation Act 1906 made it mandatory for chemical works to take into account the health and comfort of local residents, while the Public Health Act 1907 contained measures designed to prevent the spread of infectious diseases. The Released Persons (Poor Law Relief) Act 1907 sought to improve relief provisions for individuals who had been released from prisons and other institutions. In 1909 the construction of back-to-back houses was finally forbidden. For those in Ireland, the Labourers (Ireland) Act 1906 (6 Edw. 7. c. 37) empowered rural district councils to acquire land for labourers' cottages and plots, while the Town Tenants (Ireland) Act 1906 introduced compensation for unreasonable disturbance for shopkeepers, together with compensation for improvements of shops and houses for the benefit of tenants. The Public Health (Regulations as to Food) Act 1907 (7 Edw. 7. c. 32) sought to enable local authorities (as noted by one study) “to conduct closer inspection and regulation of imports, with the power to seize and destroy contaminated produce.”

The 1910 Census Bill sought to obtain more information "about both family structure and urban conditions in order for the government to develop policies to tackle problems such as infant mortality and slum housing", while administrative reforms were carried out that by 1913 "had resulted in a more effective deployment of medical staff in the infirmaries". The Labourers (Ireland) Act 1911 applied the dormant portion of the Irish Suitors' Fund to the purposes of the Labourer's Cottages' Fund, while bestowing authority upon the Irish Land Commission "to extend the limit of advances which may be made" for the provision of allotments and houses from £4.5 million to £5.5 million, while also providing further powers for the demolition of unhealthy cottages. The Public Health (Ireland) Act 1911 empowered Irish local authorities to set up regulations for the seizure of unsound meat and for inspecting slaughterhouses, while the Public Health (Scotland) Act 1897 was amended by the Public Health (Scotland) Act 1911 to extend the powers of local authorities under the Public Health (Scotland) Act 1897 to any body of commissioners or trustees authorised to supply water.

The Relief Regulation Order 1911 removed restrictions on relief provided to widows and their children, together with individuals who were infirm as a result of old age. At the same time, the order forbade the granting of outdoor relief to persons seen as able-bodied except under certain situations. The Poor Law Institutions Order 1913 prohibited children aged between 3 and 16 (as noted by one study) “from being maintained in a general workhouse for more than six weeks.”

The Public Health (Prevention and Treatment of Disease) Act 1913 empowered local authorities to formulate tuberculosis schemes, In 1914, local authorities received grants from the government to provide maternal and child welfare services. while the Criminal Justice Administration Act 1914 compelled magistrates to allow for sufficient time to be made for paying fines. As noted by the historian C. P. Hill, this legislation was both merciful and economical, as it helped to reduce the prison population.

Under Part 1 of the National Insurance Act 1911, compulsory health insurance was provided for workers earning less than £160 per year. The scheme was contributed to by the worker who contributed fourpence, the employer who contributed threepence and the government who contributed twopence. The scheme provided sickness benefit entitlement of nine shillings, free medical treatment and maternity benefit of 30 shillings. An estimated 13 million workers came to be compulsorily covered under this scheme. Part 2 of the act gave workers the right to sick pay of 9s a week and free medical treatment in return for a payment of 4d a week. Sick pay would be paid for 26 weeks of sickness. The medical treatment was provided by doctors who belonged to a "panel" in each district. Doctors received a fee from the insurance fund for each panel patient they treated. The act also gave workers the right to unemployment pay of 7s 6d a week for 15 weeks in return for a payment of 2½d a week. This scheme was also financed through the contributions of workers and government. Although only a minority of workers were insured by this scheme, it nevertheless covered a number of trades and industries, such as shipbuilding, which were particularly vulnerable to fluctuations in employment.

Although the National Health Insurance scheme was not universal in its coverage, it was nevertheless of great benefit to the majority of Britons. The scheme safeguarded health and made Britain a fitter nation, while doing much to accustom wage earners to medical attention. Doctors also benefited from the scheme in that it provided most of them with a more reliable and higher income, and led to an increase in the number of doctors. The National Health Insurance scheme arguably paved the way for the eventual establishment of the more comprehensive and universal National Health Service (NHS).

=== Agriculture ===
Various measures were introduced to improve the quality of rural life and safeguard farmers. The Agricultural Holdings Act 1906 (6 Edw. 7. c. 56) allowed farmers to farm their holdings without interference from landlords. The Small Holdings and Allotments Act 1907 (7 Edw. 7. c. 54) and the Small Holdings and Allotments Act 1908 (8 Edw. 7. c. 36) sought to limit the degree to which fixtures and improvements remained the property of landlords, and to increase the number of small farmers. The Small Holdings and Allotments Act 1908 empowered county councils to purchase agricultural land to lease as smallholdings. Between 1908 and 1914 some 200,000 acres were acquired by county councils and some 14,000 holdings were created.

The Butter and Margarine Act 1907 (7 Edw. 7. c. 21) included various provisions designed to protect farmers and consumers, while the Fertilisers and Feeding Stuffs Act 1906 (6 Edw. 7. c. 27) sought to ensure that sellers of feeding stuffs and fertilisers made clear to farmers what they were paying for and that farmers got what they wanted. In Ireland, the Irish Land Act 1909 (9 Edw. 7. c. 42) "helped force landlords to sell land to tenants".

Under the leadership of David Lloyd George Liberals extended minimum wages to farm workers starting in 1909 then succeeding in 1924.

== People's Budget (1909) ==
The Liberal reforms were funded by David Lloyd George passing his Finance Bill (that he called "the People's Budget") which taxed the "rich" in order to subsidize "working" citizens and the ill and injured.

Lloyd George argued that his budget would eliminate poverty, and commended the budget thus:

This is a war Budget. It is for raising money to wage implacable warfare against poverty and squalidness. I cannot help hoping and believing that before this generation has passed away, we shall have advanced a great step towards that good time, when poverty, and the wretchedness and human degradation which always follows in its camp, will be as remote to the people of this country as the wolves which once infested its forests.

The budget met opposition in the House of Lords and, contrary to British constitutional convention, the Conservatives used their large majority in the Lords to vote down the Budget. In response, the Liberals turned to (what they believed to be) the widespread unpopularity of the Lords to make reducing the power of the Lords an important issue of the January 1910 general election.

The Liberals returned in a hung parliament after the election: The Liberals formed a minority government with the support of the Labour and Irish nationalist MPs. The Lords subsequently accepted the Budget when the land tax proposal was dropped. However, as a result of the dispute over the Budget, the new government introduced resolutions (that would later form the Parliament Bill) to limit the power of the Lords. The Prime Minister, H. H. Asquith, asked Edward VII to create sufficient new Liberal peers to pass the Bill if the Lords rejected it. The King assented, provided that Asquith went back to the polls to obtain an explicit mandate for the constitutional change.

The Lords voted this 1910 Parliament Bill down, so Asquith called a second general election in December 1910, and again formed a minority government. Edward VII had died in May 1910, but George V agreed that, if necessary, he would create 500 new Liberal peers to neutralise the Conservative majority in the Lords. The Conservative Lords then backed down, and on 10 August 1911, the House of Lords passed the Parliament Act 1911 by a narrow 131–114 vote.

In his War Memoirs, Lloyd George said of this time, "the partisan warfare that raged round these topics was so fierce that by 1913 this country was brought to the verge of civil war".

Similarly progressive was a later budget introduced in 1914, which brought greater progressivity into the taxation system by increasing levels of direct taxation on the wealthy while also investing more money in social services. The educational grant was increased, with money allocated towards the training of specialist teachers, schools for the deformed, grants for open-air schools for victims of tuberculosis, and further state provision for school-meal services. In addition, new provisions for maternity centres, sanitoriums, and ancillary health services under the National Insurance Act 1911 were introduced, together with £4 million in loans for local authority housebuilding.

== Limitations ==
While the Liberal reforms were one of Britain's most ambitious welfare reform programmes, there were several limitations to the reforms they passed. Free school meals were not compulsory. Pensions were refused to those who had not been in work most of their life. The labour exchange programme often managed to find people only part-time casual work. The poor had to pay National Insurance contributions out of their wages and the 7s 6d was not enough to live on. Unemployment and sickness pay also only lasted for a limited time. Free medical care was available to only a wage-earner, not the wife or children or grandparents and other relatives. The new National Health Insurance scheme also did not provide coverage for all forms of medical care. It did not provide cover for special advice while many people could not get acquire dental, ophthalmic or other treatment through NHI. Also, other people were not covered for convalescent homes, while the only specialist services for those in NHI were for TB and VD. The welfare measures introduced by the Liberal government concerning the sick, the elderly and the children did, however, lead to a reduction in poverty, with the total number of paupers falling from 916,377 in 1910 to 748,019 by 1914.

== Contemporary criticism ==
The Liberal reforms received criticism from those who saw this level of government action to mitigate social evils as interfering with market forces and thus being antithetical to the operations of a free market. One political cartoon of the time criticised the reforms as allegedly socialist in nature. The cost of the reforms was also criticised and there were also critics who suggested that the reforms would not work in practice.

There were classical liberals who opposed these reforms; this included Harold Cox, elected as a Liberal in 1906, and who was almost alone among Liberal MPs in his opposition. He considered them to be "eroding freedom" and "undermining individual responsibility". As noted by one historian, in regards to the introduction of old age pensions, "The Old Age Pensions Bill was going uneventfully through the House of Commons piloted by Lloyd George, and openly opposed only by a handful of Diehard individualists led by the Liberal Diehard, Mr. Harold Cox." As noted by another historian, Cox was “the only Liberal to vote against the Old Age Pension Bill on the third reading.”

The Liberal journalist and editor of The Economist (1907–1916) Francis Hirst also opposed the reforms and the welfare state in general.

Some workers objected to paying 4d per week to the National Insurance contributions. The chant "Taffy was a Welshman, Taffy was a thief" was chanted at Lloyd George by workers and referred to the suggestion that the Welshman Lloyd George was taking their wages away from them. However, Lloyd George responded with his famous phrase "Nine pence for four pence" which referenced the fact that employers and the government were topping up the workers' contributions.

== Legislation ==
- Trade Disputes Act 1906 – Protected trade unions from legal claims for damages by businesses affected by strikes.
- Workmen's Compensation Act 1906 – Granted compensation for injury at work.
- Merchant Shipping Act 1906
- Education (Provision of Meals) Act 1906
- Education (Administrative Provisions) Act 1907 – created school medical inspections.
- Matrimonial Causes Act 1907
- Coal Mines Regulation Act 1908 – Miners now worked 8-hour days.
- Children and Young Persons Act 1908 (Children's Charter)
- Old Age Pensions Act 1908
- Labour Exchanges Act 1909
- Trade Boards Act 1909
- Housing, Town Planning, etc. Act 1909
- National Insurance Act 1911
- Shops Act 1911 – shop workers could now take half a day off work per week.
- Coal Mines (Minimum Wage) Act 1912

From 1911 MPs were given a salary of £400 (equivalent to £41,000 in 2025) per annum, meaning that it was much easier for working-class people to stand for election.

== See also ==
- Edwardian era
- History of the welfare state in the United Kingdom
