= Cockerton Judgement =

The Cockerton Judgement of 1899 determined that it was unlawful for the London School Board to spend money raised in the rates to fund higher-grade classes in science and art, thus limiting them to providing education for the under 12s.

== Background ==
The Elementary Education Act 1870 (33 & 34 Vict. c. 75) had created local school boards to be responsible for the provision of elementary education. Some school boards also established classes for higher classes. These "higher tops" and even separate schools were provided for older pupils who showed ability and commitment, along with new types of evening school for adults. This competition angered churches who were lobbying for public money for the church schools, and some older grammar schools who were also having problems with finance. It was seen by leading Conservatives as an unacceptable extension to local government, and an unacceptable use of the rates.

== The test case ==
In 1899, Sir John Gorst's private secretary Sir Robert Morant (1863–1920) engineered a test case in which a School of Art in London complained of competition from evening classes run by the London School Board. The District Auditor – Cockerton – ruled that the London School Board could not use the rates to fund higher-grade classes in science and art. The London School Board unsuccessfully appealed twice. A new education act was needed.

== Implications ==
The Cockerton Judgment halted advanced, or secondary, teaching fostered by the more radical and enterprising school boards. It prevented school boards from funding anything but elementary schools. As an interim measure, the Board of Education established, by minute dated 6 April 1900, a new system of "Higher elementary schools". The subsequent Education Act 1902 (Balfour Act), which Morant drafted, created all-embracing local education authorities which had a wider remit and powers to provide public monies to the church schools. Morant became Permanent Secretary of the Board of Education in April 1903.

== Bibliography ==
- Gillard, Derek. "The History of Education in England - History". www.educationengland.org.uk.
