= Board of Education Act 1899 =

Act of the Parliament of the United Kingdom

Board of Education Act 1899 (Note: Section 8(3).)
- Act of Parliament
- Parliament of the United Kingdom
- Long title: An Act to provide for the Establishment of a Board of Education for England and Wales, and for matters connected therewith.
- Citation: 62 & 63 Vict. c. 33
- Territorial extent: England and Wales (Note: Section 8(1).)

Dates
- Royal assent: 9 August 1899
- Commencement: 1 April 1900 (Note: Section 8(2).)
- Repealed: 10 August 1944 (Note: The Education (Date of Appointment of Minister) Order 1944.)
Other legislation
Repeals/revokes	Education Department Act 1856
Amended by	Education Act 1921
Repealed by	Education Act 1944

Status: Repealed

Text of statute as originally enacted

The Board of Education Act 1899 (62 & 63 Vict. c. 33) was an act of the Parliament of the United Kingdom concerning education.

The act created the Board of Education for England and Wales to replace the previous Education and Science and Art departments. The board acted as a central authority for education in the United Kingdom. As part of its responsibilities, it was empowered to create a register of teachers.
