= School boards in England and Wales =

Defunct public governing bodies

School board district
- Category: Ad hoc single purpose
- Location: England and Wales
- Created by: Elementary Education Act 1870
- Created: 1870
- Abolished by: Education Act 1902
- Abolished: 1902 (1904 in London)
- Number: c. 2,500 (as of 1902)
- Government: School board
- Subdivisions: Divisions (London only)

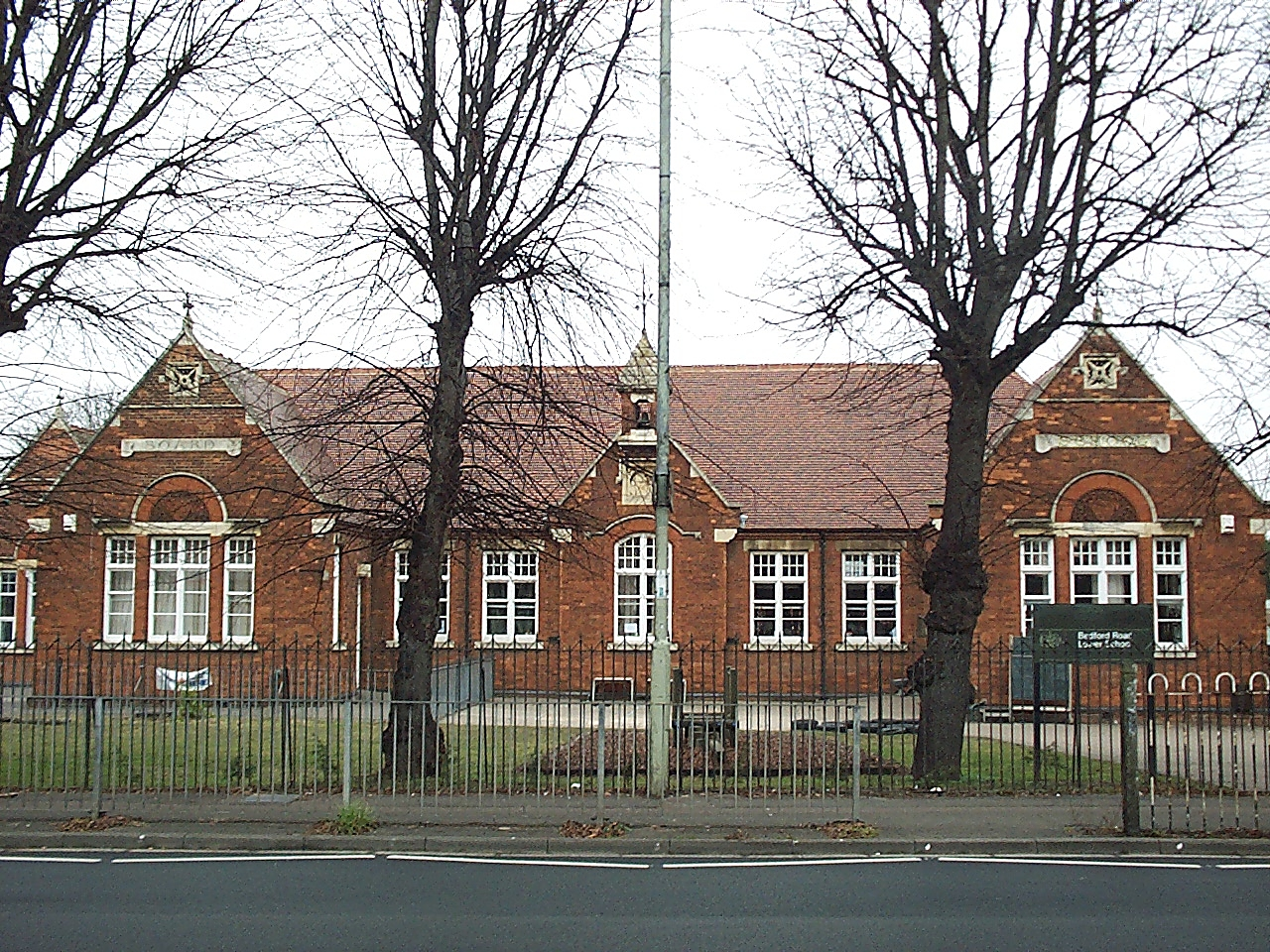
A board school in Kempston, Bedfordshire

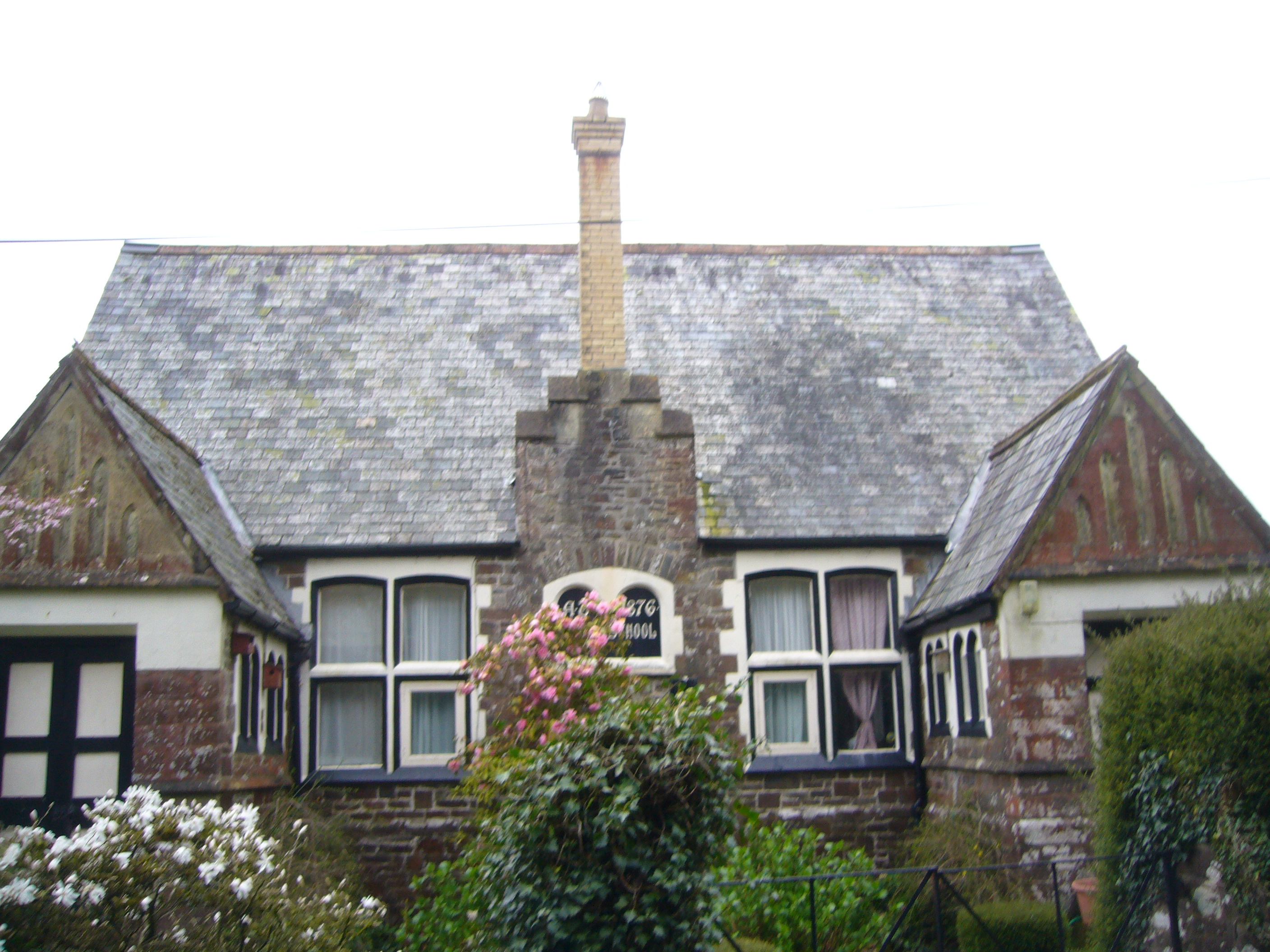
Country Board School in Devon near South Molton. Opened 1876 for just 16 pupils; closed 1922. Now a private dwelling (semi-detached) and Grade II listed.

School boards were ad hoc public bodies in England and Wales that existed between 1870 and 1902. They established and administered elementary schools, called "board schools".

== Creation ==
The Elementary Education Act 1870 (33 & 34 Vict. c. 75) permitted the creation of school boards in areas where they were needed. The legislation followed campaigning by George Dixon, Joseph Chamberlain and the National Education League for elementary education free from Anglican doctrine. Education was still not free of fees.

The first schedule of the 1870 Act permitted school boards for:

- the Metropolitan Board of Works area
- the district of the Oxford Local Board of Health
- every municipal borough except Oxford
- every civil parish (or part of a civil parish) that was outside of the above.

Around 2,500 school boards were created between 1870 and 1896.

== Powers and functions ==
Each board could:

- raise funds from a rate
- build and run non-denominational schools where existing voluntary provision was inadequate
- subsidise church schools where appropriate
- pay the fees of the poorest children
- if they deemed it necessary, create a by-law making attendance compulsory between the ages of five and 13 until the Elementary Education Act 1880, which made it compulsory for all
- not provide any religious education other than simple Bible reading.

== Election of members ==
Members were directly elected, not appointed by borough councils or parish vestries. The elections used cumulative voting, a system under which each voter could cast as many votes as there were seats on a school board or on a London School Board division.

Unusually for the time, women were eligible to win election to school boards. When the first elections were held, in 1870, nine women were elected across the country: Elizabeth Garrett Anderson and Emily Davies to the London School Board, Anne Ashworth and Caroline Shum in Bath, Catherine Ricketts in Brighton, Lydia Becker in Manchester, Marian Huth in Huddersfield, Eleanor Smith in Oxford, and Jennetta Temple in Exeter.

== Abolition ==
School boards were abolished by the Education Act 1902, which made the councils of counties and county boroughs into local education authorities.

== See also ==
- History of education in England
- Birmingham board schools
- List of former board schools in Brighton and Hove
- Board of education

== Sources ==
- J. Stuart MacLure, Educational Documents, England and Wales 1816 to the Present Day, 1965, 1979, ISBN 0-416-72810-3 370.942
- W. B. Stephens, Education in Britain 1750–1914, 1998, ISBN 0-333-60512-8
