= Education (Administrative Provisions) Act 1907 =

Act of the Parliament of the United Kingdom

Education (Administrative Provisions) Act 1907 (Note: Section 17(1).)
- Act of Parliament
- Parliament of the United Kingdom
- Long title: An Act to make provision for the better administration by the Central and Local Authorities in England and Wales of the enactments relating to Education.
- Citation: 7 Edw. 7. c. 43
- Territorial extent: United Kingdom

Dates
- Royal assent: 28 August 1907
- Commencement: 1 January 1908 (Note: Section 13(2).); 1 April 1908 (Note: Section 1.)
- Repealed: 31 July 1978
Other legislation
Amends	Education Act 1902
Amended by	Education Act 1918; Education Act 1921; National Loans Act 1968
Repealed by	Statute Law (Repeals) Act 1978

Status: Repealed

Text of statute as originally enacted

The Education (Administrative Provisions) Act 1907 (7 Edw. 7. c. 43) was an act of the Parliament of the United Kingdom passed by the Liberal government as part of their Liberal reforms package of welfare reforms. The act amongst the 'administrative provisions' granted additional powers to local educational authorities to purchase sites for schools, grant scholarships, establish 'vacation schools' and set up school medical inspections.

== Subsequent developments ==
The whole act, except sections 2, 8, 16 and 17, was repealed by section 172 of, and the seventh schedule to, the Education Act 1921 (11 & 12 Geo. 5. c. 51), which came into force on 1 October 1921.

The whole act was repealed by section 1(1) of, and part V of schedule 1 to, the Statute Law (Repeals) Act 1978, which came into force on 31 July 1978.
