= Education Act 1902 =

Act of the Parliament of the United Kingdom

Education Act 1902 (Note: Section 27(4).)
- Act of Parliament
- Parliament of the United Kingdom
- Long title: An Act to make further provision with respect to Education in England and Wales.
- Citation: 2 Edw. 7. c. 42
- Territorial extent: England and Wales (coverage in London began in 1904) (Note: Section 27(1).)

Dates
- Royal assent: 18 December 1902
- Commencement: 26 March 1903 (Note: Section 27(2).)
- Repealed: 1 October 1921
Other legislation
Repeals/revokes	Technical Instruction Act 1889; Technical Instruction Act 1891; Elementary Education (Orders) Act 1874; Elementary Education Act 1897
Amended by	Children Act 1908; Education Act 1918
Repealed by	Education Act 1921
Relates to	Education (Provision of Meals) Act 1906

Status: Repealed

Text of statute as originally enacted

The Education Act 1902 (2 Edw. 7. c. 42), also known as the Balfour Act, was an act of the Parliament of the United Kingdom that set the pattern of elementary education in England and Wales for four decades. The act was highly controversial and was brought to Parliament by a Conservative government and was supported by the Church of England, opposed by many Nonconformists and the Liberal Party. The act provided funds for denominational religious instruction in voluntary elementary schools, most of which were owned by the Church of England and the Roman Catholics. It reduced the divide between voluntary schools, which were largely administered by the Church of England, and schools provided and run by elected school boards, and reflected the influence of the Efficiency Movement in Britain. It was extended in 1903 to cover London.

The act was a short-term political disaster for the Conservatives, who lost massively at the 1906 general election. However, G. R. Searle has argued that it was a long-term success. It standardized and upgraded the educational systems of England and Wales and led to a rapid growth of secondary schools, with over 1,000 opening by 1914, including 349 for girls only. The Church schools had financing from local ratepayers and had to meet uniform standards. Eventually, in the Education Act 1944, the Anglican schools were brought largely under the control of local education authorities.

== Terms ==
The "Cockerton Judgment" of 1901 caused a crisis by undermining the lawfulness of "higher grade schools" for children over the age of twelve. A temporary fix allowed the schools to operate one more year. A second issue involved the 14,000 church schools, called "voluntary schools". The term is derived from the funding of the schools through voluntary subscriptions and contributions. These were run chiefly by the Church of England and including some Roman Catholic schools. They were poorly funded and did not receive a share of local taxes, but they educated a third of school children.

Under the act the existing overlapping jurisdictions, with 2,568 school boards set up by the Elementary Education Act 1870 (33 & 34 Vict. c. 75), as well as all existing school attendance committees, were abolished. Their duties were handed over to county councils or county borough councils, as local education authorities (LEAs). The 328 LEAs fixed local tax rates. The LEAs could establish new secondary and technical schools as well as developing the existing system of elementary schools. These LEAs were in charge of paying schoolteachers, ensuring they were properly qualified, and providing necessary books and equipment. They paid the teachers in the church schools, with the churches providing and maintaining the school buildings and providing the religious instruction.

== Church Party ==
The Church Party, a Conservative faction strongly supportive of the Church of England, largely shaped Conservative educational policy. Under the leadership of Lord Cranborne, it was determined to stop the spread of secularism in education. With John Gilbert Talbot, Cranborne organized opposition to the Education Department and the radical spokesman Arthur Acland from 1894. They blocked the Education Department's attempts to slow the growth of Anglican schools. They successfully passed the Voluntary Schools Act 1897, an interim measure. They demanded long-term legislation in 1897–1901, and scored their great victory in 1902.

The design and drafting of the bill was the work of Robert Laurie Morant, a civil servant in the Education Department. He worked closely with Arthur Balfour (who became Prime Minister in succession to Lord Salisbury in July 1902) and Church leaders in 1901 .

== Joseph Chamberlain ==
Joseph Chamberlain's support base was threatened by Balfour's introduction into Parliament of the Education Bill. This bill was framed with the intention of promoting National Efficiency, a cause which Chamberlain thought worthy. However, the Education Bill proposed to abolish Britain's 2,568 school boards established under W. E. Forster's Elementary Education Act 1870 (33 & 34 Vict. c. 75), bodies that were popular with Nonconformists and Radicals. Liberals opposed the act, arguing that the board schools had outperformed the voluntary Anglican schools. In their place, Balfour proposed to establish local education authorities, which would administer a state-centred system of primary, secondary and technical schools. Furthermore, the bill would grant ratepayers' money to voluntary Church of England schools. Chamberlain, religiously a Unitarian, was anxious about the bill's proposals, aware that they would estrange Nonconformists, Radicals and many Liberal Unionists from the government.

However, as Colonial Secretary in the Conservative-Liberal Unionist coalition government, Chamberlain could not openly oppose the bill. Chamberlain warned Robert Laurie Morant about the probability of Nonconformist dissent, asking why voluntary schools could not receive funds from the state rather than from the rates (local property taxes). In response, Morant argued that the Second Boer War had drained the Exchequer of finances.

The furore over the Education Bill imperilled the Liberal Unionist wing of the government, with the prospect of Nonconformist voters switching allegiance to the Liberal Party. Chamberlain sought to stem the feared exodus by securing a major concession: local authorities would be given discretion over the issue of rate aid to voluntary schools; yet even this was renounced before the guillotining of the bill and its passage through Parliament in December 1902. Thus Chamberlain had to make the best of a hopeless situation, writing fatalistically that "I consider the Unionist cause is hopeless at the next election, and we shall certainly lose the majority of the Liberal Unionists once and for all." Chamberlain already regarded tariff reform as an issue that could revitalise support for Unionism.

== Opposition ==
Opposition to the act came especially from Methodists, Baptists and other Nonconformists outraged at support for Anglican and Catholic schools, and angry at losing their powerful role on elected school boards. Historian Standish Meacham explores their position:

the act put an end to the broad-based expansion of secondary education that had originated in the so-called higher grade schools established by progressive, popularly elected local boards. Instead, secondary education was [to be] administered by county council committees and occurred in specifically designated "secondary" schools, admission to which was strictly controlled so as to exclude all but a very few working-class children. This important issue [was] a matter of major concern to working-class reformers anxious to provide a democratic "highway" rather than an exclusionary "ladder" to secondary education.

The Liberal Party led the opposition and made it a major issue especially in the election of 1906; the Labour Movement was mostly opposed. Nonconformist opposition was championed by John Clifford, the Baptist pastor of Westbourne Park Church in London, who became the recognized leader of the passive resistance to the Education Act 1902. Clifford formed the National Passive Resistance Committee, which hoped to convince more Nonconformists to resist the act and stop paying their rates until it was repealed. By 1904 over 37,000 summonses for unpaid school taxes were issued, with thousands having their property seized and 80 protesters going to prison. It operated for another decade but had no impact on the school system. Clifford in 1906 worked tirelessly to mobilize Baptist voters to defeat Balfour.

== The failed Education Bill of 1906 ==
The Education Act 1902 developed into a major political issue, which contributed significantly to the Liberal Party landslide victory in the general election in 1906. Augustine Birrell was appointed President of the Board of Education and worked closely with David Lloyd George and other Liberals in 1906 to pass a new education bill.

At the first Cabinet meeting of the new government, a committee was set up chaired by Lord Crewe, Lord President of the Council, which spent two months drawing up a bill. The Birrell bill would have ended public support of all religious schools. The initial priorities were, as pledged during the election, public control over voluntary (mainly church) schools and no religious tests for teachers (to prevent church schools employing only teachers of their own denomination). However, other questions soon arose, as to whether privately owned schools could be brought under state control without laying the government open to charges of confiscating property, or whether religious instruction should take place two days a week, or every day, and whether it should be within school hours or at the start or end of the day (i.e. to allow parents who objected to withdraw their children to attend religious instruction of their choice, as permitted under the Elementary Education Act 1870). Lloyd George appears to have been the dominant figure on the committee in its later stages, and insisted that the bill create a separate education committee for Wales.

The Cabinet, hoping to bring an end to this long-standing matter of dispute, included many compromises to satisfy lobby groups, including clause 4, which allowed any borough or urban district with population in excess of 5,000 to provide denominational teaching every day, provided at least 80% of parents demanded it – a condition likely to be met only in Catholic areas of Liverpool and perhaps other large cities. This satisfied neither Catholics, who preferred to keep control over their own schools, nor Anglicans, whose schools tended to be in rural areas where only the standard two days per week of denominational teaching was to be permitted, nor Nonconformists who tended to favour the existing system of non-denominational teaching in state schools.

The bill was introduced in the Commons on 9 April 1906. Augustine Birrell proved a poor advocate, complaining privately that the bill owed more to Lloyd George and that he himself had had little say in its contents. The bill faced hundreds of protest meetings by Anglicans, who complained that non-denominational religious teaching was in breach of their consciences. There were also protest meetings by Nonconformists who objected to the proposed introduction of denominational teaching in state schools. For the rest of the year, Lloyd George made numerous public speeches attacking the House of Lords for mutilating the bill with wrecking amendments, accusing them of defying the Liberals' electoral mandate to reform the Education Act 1902. Unexpectedly a prominent then-Anglican layman, G. K. Chesterton, became a leader of the opposition to the Birrell Bill.

In the end, Balfour, now leader of the Conservative opposition, used his mastery of parliamentary procedure to defeat any compromise and keep his 1902 act intact. On 12 December 1906 the Commons rejected the Lords' amendments by 414 votes to 107. After the Lords, which until 1911 still had equal say with the Commons over legislation, voted to reinstate its amendments, the bill was abandoned. Further bills were introduced in 1907 and 1908, and also abandoned. As a result of Lloyd George's lobbying, a separate department for Wales (Note: Scotland had, and has, its own education system, separate from that of England and Wales.) was created within the Board of Education.

Nonconformists were bitterly upset by the failure of the Liberal Party to carry through on its most important promise to them. Support for Liberal candidates fell away. They eventually closed nearly all of their schools.

American historian Bentley Gilbert evaluates the political wisdom of Liberal dependence on Nonconformist support:

The Campbell-Bannerman government was, as its sorry performance would show in the next three years, more the hostage than the master of its swollen and unhealthy majority. It seemed to be at the mercy of single-issue eccentrics and special-interest cranks who forced it to waste valuable parliamentary time attempting to enact huge and complicated quasi-constitutional measures that would best benefit only a minority of the king's subjects, while the rest, the majority, if not opposed, remained uninterested.

== Subsequent developments ==
The whole act was repealed by section 172 of, and the seventh schedule to, the Education Act 1921 (11 & 12 Geo. 5. c. 51), which came into force on 1 October 1921.

== See also ==
- Nonconformist conscience
- Education (Provision of Meals) Act 1906, a noncontroversial welfare law
- Education (Administrative Provisions) Act 1907, grant or extension of various administrative powers
