= Education (Provision of Meals) Act 1906 =

Act of the Parliament of the United Kingdom

- Act of Parliament
- Parliament of the United Kingdom
- Long title: An Act to make provision for Meals for Children attending Public Elementary Schools in England and Wales.
- Citation: 6 Edw. 7. c. 57
- Territorial extent: England and Wales; Ireland; (Note: Section 7.)

Dates
- Royal assent: 21 December 1906
- Commencement: 21 December 1906 (Note: The Acts of Parliament (Commencement) Act 1793.)
- Repealed: 1 October 1921
Other legislation
Amended by	Education Act 1918
Repealed by	Education Act 1921
Relates to	Education Act 1902

Status: Repealed

Text of statute as originally enacted

The Education (Provision of Meals) Act of 1906 (6 Edw. 7. c. 57) was an act of the Parliament of the United Kingdom that allowed the local government to provide meals for children in schools. The Act was first introduced to address problems about child hunger and poverty in Britain. At this time, many children faced challenges getting enough food, which could affect their ability to learn and their overall health. The law marked a first step in meeting the needs of the children.

During the late 19th and early 20th centuries, hunger and poverty were on the rise and were major concerns in Britain. Many working-class families struggled to put food on their table, making their children more in need. The act provided a midday meal and milk to these children.

Not all local authorities offered meals, however. "[B]y 1911, only 40 percent of Local Education Authorities offered meals." By the 1930s, "meals were only served to around 4 percent of the school population." Even in times of high struggle, school meals were still not widely offered to children who needed them.

The Education (Provision of Meals) Act was an important piece in history for Britain. Although it did not require every single school to provide meals, local authorities stepped in to feed these struggling children. This law helped create a turn-around for future school meal programs and changed how the government, (and even the public), contributed to the change of how these meals were provided.

== Subsequent developments ==
The whole act was repealed by section 172 of, and the seventh schedule to, the Education Act 1921 (11 & 12 Geo. 5. c. 51), which came into force on 1 October 1921.

== See also ==
- School meal
