= Education Act 1918 =

Act of the Parliament of the United Kingdom

Education Act 1918 (Note: Section 52(1).)
- Act of Parliament
- Parliament of the United Kingdom
- Long title: An Act to make further provision with respect to Education in England and Wales and for purposes connected therewith.
- Citation: 8 & 9 Geo. 5. c. 39
- Territorial extent: England and Wales (Note: Section 52(2).)

Dates
- Royal assent: 8 August 1918
- Commencement: (Note: Section 52(3).)
Other legislation
Amends	Education Act 1902; Education (Provision of Meals) Act 1906; Education (Administrative Provisions) Act 1907
Repeals/revokes	Elementary Education Act Amendment Act 1872; Education Code (1890) Act 1890; Elementary Education Act 1891; Elementary Education (School Attendance) Act 1893; School Board Conference Act 1897; Elementary Education (School Attendance) Act (1893) Amendment Act 1899; Education Act 1901; Education Act (1901) (Renewal) Act 1902; Education (Provision of Working Balances) Act 1903; Education (Small Population Grants) Act 1915; Elementary Education (Fee Grant) Act 1916
Amended by	Education Act 1921; Education Act 1944; Charities Act 1960; Education Act 1973
Relates to	Education (Scotland) Act 1918

Status: Partially repealed

Text of statute as originally enacted

Revised text of statute as amended

Text of the Education Act 1918 as in force today (including any amendments) within the United Kingdom, from legislation.gov.uk.

Education (Scotland) Act 1918 (Note: Section 33(3).)
- Act of Parliament
- Parliament of the United Kingdom
- Long title: An Act to make further provision with respect to Education in Scotland and for purposes connected therewith.
- Citation: 8 & 9 Geo. 5. c. 48
- Territorial extent: Scotland (Note: Section 33(1).)

Dates
- Royal assent: 21 November 1918
- Commencement: various (Note: Section 33(2).)
- Repealed: 1 October 1962
Other legislation
Amends	Education (Scotland) Act 1872; Education (Scotland) Act 1908
Amended by	Statute Law Revision Act 1950
Repealed by	Rating (Scotland) Act 1926; Local Government (Scotland) Act 1929; Children and Young Persons (Scotland) Act 1932; Education (Scotland) Act 1945; Education (Scotland) Act 1946; Local Government (Scotland) Act 1947; Statute Law Revision Act 1950; Education (Scotland) Act 1962
Relates to	Education Act 1918

Status: Repealed

Text of statute as originally enacted

The Education Act 1918 (8 & 9 Geo. 5. c. 39), often known as the Fisher Act, is an act of the Parliament of the United Kingdom. It was drawn up by H. A. L. Fisher. Herbert Lewis, Parliamentary Secretary to the Board of Education, also played a key role in drawing up the act. The act applied only to England and Wales; a separate Education (Scotland) Act 1918 applied for Scotland.

This raised the school leaving age to fourteen and planned to expand government provided education up to eighteen years of age. Other features of the Education Act 1918 included the provision of ancillary services (medical inspection, nursery schools, centres for pupils with special needs, etc.).

Industrialists, landowners, and the Church of England resisted the act, which raised the school leaving age from 12 to 14, made it much harder to employ children under 12, and put in place scholarships to fee-paying grammar schools. The act promised compulsory part-time education from 14 to 18, but this was never implemented because of the Geddes Axe (spending cuts) of 1921. Teachers’ pay was also cut at that time and again in the May Committee cuts of 1931.

== Hadow reports ==
By the 1920s, the education of young children was of growing interest and concern to politicians, as well as to educationalists. As a result of this rising level of public debate, the Government of the day referred a number of topics for enquiry to the Consultative Committee of the Board of Education, then chaired by Sir William Henry Hadow. Under him, the committee produced six reports between 1923 and 1933.

Besides Hadow himself and secretary throughout R. F. Young, forty people served on the committee over the years, including John George Adami, Sir Graham Balfour, Albert Mansbridge, A. J. Mundella, and R. H. Tawney amongst others.

Three very important reports were published in 1926, 1931 and 1933.

These reports led to major changes in the structure of primary (known as "elementary" at the time) education. In particular, they resulted in separate and distinctive educational practice for children aged 5–7 (infants) and those aged 7–11 (juniors).

The reports recommended child-centred approaches and class sizes of no more than thirty. These recommendations marked a triumph of 'progressive' educational thought and practice over the more 'traditional' ideas and proved to be popular with many policy makers and teachers alike.

== Subsequent developments ==
The whole act, except sections 14, 42, 45, 47 and 52, was repealed by section 172 of, and the seventh schedule to, the Education Act 1921 (11 & 12 Geo. 5. c. 51), which came into force on 1 October 1921.
