= HORSA =

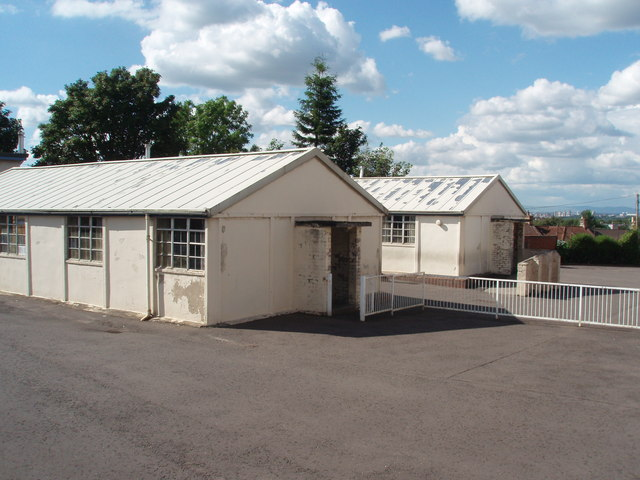
'HORSA huts' from c.1947 at Machanhill Primary School, South Lanarkshire

HORSA is the acronym for the 'Hutting Operation for the Raising of the School-Leaving Age', a programme of hut-building in schools introduced by the UK Government to support the expansion of education under the Education Act 1944 to raise the compulsory education age by a year to age 15.

== Background ==
Government plans to increase the school leaving age resulted in the need to accommodate 168,000 additional pupils. Along with the need to replace buildings lost and damaged in World War II and the post-war baby boom, this contributed to massive demand for low cost prefabricated 'hut'-style classrooms and other school buildings. 7,000 new classrooms and 928 new primary schools were built in 1945-50.

The programme was the responsibility of George Tomlinson, the Minister of Education in the post-war Clement Attlee government. There is some evidence the programme struggled to cope with demand. However, the scheme progressed and was regarded as complete by 1950.

== HORSA huts ==
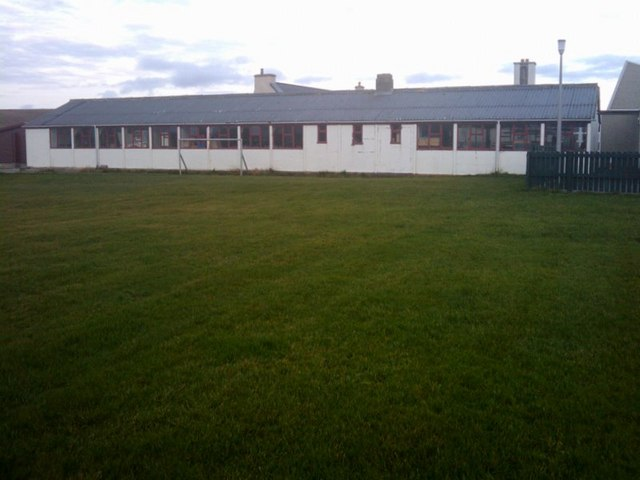
HORSA hut block, Baltasound Junior High School, Shetland

HORSA huts were constructed of concrete and timber with corrugated asbestos-filled roofs, arrived onsite as flat pack deliveries and once assembled they resembled the spartan buildings used in army camps in the war. Although intended as temporary accommodation with an expected lifespan of only ten years, 'Horsa huts' were often used well beyond this and some still survived as of 2012. Although now often in poor physical condition and regarded as having little architectural merit, demolition of those built before 1 July 1948 requires listed building consent if they fall within the curtilage of a listed building.
