= Education Act 1921 =

Act of the Parliament of the United Kingdom

Education Act 1921 (Note: Section 173(1).)
- Act of Parliament
- Parliament of the United Kingdom
- Long title: An Act to consolidate the enactments relating to Education and certain enactments relating to the Employment of Children and Young Persons.
- Citation: 11 & 12 Geo. 5. c. 51
- Territorial extent: England and Wales (Note: Section 173(2).)

Dates
- Royal assent: 19 August 1921
- Commencement: 1 October 1921 (Note: Section 173(3). The act was to come into force on appointed days, not earlier than 1 January 1922, as determined by the Board of Education.)
- Repealed: 1 April 1945
Other legislation
| Amends | See § Repealed enactments |
| Repeals/revokes | See § Repealed enactments |
| Amended by | Local Government Act 1933; Unemployment Insurance Act 1935 |
| Repealed by | Education Act 1944 |

Status: Repealed

Text of statute as originally enacted

The Education Act 1921 (11 & 12 Geo. 5. c. 51) was an act of the Parliament of the United Kingdom which consolidated enactments related to education and the employment of children and young persons in England and Wales.

== Provisions ==
=== Repealed enactments ===
Section 172 of the act repealed 31 enactments, listed in the seventh schedule to the act.

| Citation | Short title | Description | Extent of repeal |
|---|---|---|---|
| 33 & 34 Vict. c. 75 | Elementary Education Act 1870 | The Elementary Education Act, 1870. | The whole act so far as unrepealed, except sections one and two, section three (so far as it is required for the interpretation of the unrepealed portions of the Act), and sections seventy-five, seventy-eight and eighty-three. |
| 36 & 37 Vict. c. 86 | Elementary Education Act 1873 | The Elementary Education Act, 1873. | The whole act. |
| 37 & 38 Vict. c. 39 | Elementary Education (Wenlock) Act 1874 | An Act to provide for the exception of the borough of Wenlock from the boroughs category of boroughs under the Elementary Education Act 1870. | The whole act. |
| 39 & 40 Vict. c. 79 | Elementary Education Act 1876 | The Elementary Education Act, 1876. | The whole act. |
| 40 & 41 Vict. c. 60 | Canal Boats Act 1877 | The Canal Boats Act, 1877. | Section six and in section fourteen the definition of parent. |
| 43 & 44 Vict. c. 23 | Elementary Education Act 1880 | The Elementary Education Act, 1880. | The whole act. |
| 47 & 48 Vict. c. 75 | Canal Boats Act 1884 | The Canal Boats Act, 1877. | Sections five and six. |
| 54 & 55 Vict. c. 61 | Schools for Science and Art Act 1891 | The Schools for Science and Art Act, 1891. | The whole act. |
| 56 & 57 Vict. c. 42 | Elementary Education (Blind and Deaf Children) Act 1893 | The Elementary Education (Blind and Deaf Children) Act, 1893. | The whole act. |
| 60 & 61 Vict. c. 5 | Voluntary Schools Act 1897 | The Voluntary Schools Act, 1897. | The whole act. |
| 62 & 63 Vict. c. 32 | Elementary Education (Defective and Epileptic Children) Act 1899 | The Elementary Education (Defective and Epileptic Children) Act, 1899. | The whole act. |
| 62 & 63 Vict. c. 33 | Board of Education Act 1899 | The Board of Education Act, 1899. | Sections three and four. |
| 63 & 64 Vict. c. 53 | Elementary Education Act 1900 | The Elementary Education Act, 1900. | The whole act. |
| 1 Edw. 7. c. 22 | Factory and Workshop Act 1901 | The Factory and Workshop Act, 1901. | In section one hundred and thirty-four the words "or for any purpose connected with the employment in labour or elementary education of the young person or child." |
| 2 Edw. 7. c. 42 | Education Act 1902 | The Education Act, 1902. | The whole act. |
| 3 Edw. 7. c. 24 | Education (London) Act 1903 | The Education (London) Act, 1903. | The whole act, except paragraph 9 of the First Schedule. |
| 3 Edw. 7. c. 45 | Employment of Children Act 1903 | The Employment of Children Act, 1903. | The whole act, except so far as it relates to Scotland or Ireland. |
| 4 Edw. 7. c. 15 | Prevention of Cruelty to Children Act 1904 | The Prevention of Cruelty to Children Act, 1904. | The whole act so far as unrepealed, except so far as it relates to Scotland or Ireland, and except section twenty-seven. |
| 4 Edw. 7. c. 18 | Education (Local Authority Default) Act 1904 | The Education (Local Authority Default) Act, 1904. | The whole act. |
| 6 Edw. 7. c. 57 | Education (Provision of Meals) Act 1906 | The Education (Provision of Meals) Act, 1906. | The whole act. |
| 7 Edw. 7. c. 43 | Education (Administrative Provisions) Act 1907 | The Education (Administrative Provisions) Act, 1907 | The whole act, except sections two, eight, sixteen and seventeen. |
| 8 Edw. 7. c. 67 | Children Act 1908 | The Children Act, 1908. | Section one hundred and twenty-two. |
| 9 Edw. 7. c. 13 | Local Education Authorities (Medical Treatment) Act 1909 | The Local Education Authorities (Medical Treatment) Act, 1909. | The whole act. |
| 9 Edw. 7. c. 29 | Education (Administrative Provisions) Act 1909 | The Education (Administrative Provisions) Act, 1909. | The whole act. |
| 10 Edw. 7. & 1 Geo. 5. c. 37 | Education (Choice of Employment) Act 1910 | The Education (Choice of Employment) Act, 1910. | The whole act. |
| 1 & 2 Geo. 5. c. 32 | Education (Administrative Provisions) Act 1911 | The Education (Administrative Provisions) Act, 1911. | The whole act, except sections four and five. |
| 4 & 5 Geo. 5. c. 20 | Education (Provision of Meals) Act 1914 | The Education (Provision of Meals) Act, 1914. | The whole act. |
| 4 & 5 Geo. 5. c. 45 | Elementary Education (Defective and Epileptic Children) Act 1914 | The Elementary Education (Defective and Epileptic Children) Act, 1914. | The whole act. |
| 8 & 9 Geo. 5. c. 39 | Education Act 1918 | The Education Act, 1918. | The whole act, except sections fourteen, forty-two, forty-five, forty-seven, and fifty-two. |
| 9 & 10 Geo. 5. c. 21 | Ministry of Health Act 1919 | The Ministry of Health Act, 1919. | Paragraph (d) of subsection (1) of section three. |
| 9 & 10 Geo. 5. c. 41 | Education (Compliance with Conditions of Grant) Act 1919 | The Education (Compliance with Conditions of Grant) Act, 1919. | The whole act. |

== Subsequent developments ==
Section 107 of the act was repealed by section 116(2) of, and part I of the seventh schedule to the Unemployment Insurance Act 1935 (25 & 26 Geo. 5. c. 8), which came into force on 18 March 1935.

The whole act was repealed by section 121 of, and part I of the ninth schedule to, the Education Act 1944 (7 & 8 Geo. 6. c. 31), which came into force on 1 April 1945.
