= G. R. Searle =

British historian and professor

Geoffrey Russell Searle, born 1941, is a British historian, specialising in British nineteenth century history. He is Emeritus Professor at the University of East Anglia.

== Works ==
- The Quest for National Efficiency: A Study in British Politics and Political Thought, 1899-1914 (1971).
- Eugenics and Politics in Britain, 1900-1914 (1976).
- Corruption in British Politics, 1895-1930 (1987).
- The Liberal Party: Triumph and Disintegration, 1886-1929 (1992).
- Entrepreneurial Politics in Mid-Victorian Britain (1993).
- Country Before Party: Coalition and the Idea of National Government in Modern Britain, 1885-1987 (1995).
- Morality and the Market in Victorian Britain (1998).
- A New England? Peace and War 1886-1918 (2004), part of the New Oxford History of England.
