= Education Act 1944 =

Act of the Parliament of the United Kingdom

Education Act 1944 (Note: Section 122(1).)
- Act of Parliament
- Parliament of the United Kingdom
- Long title: An Act to reform the law relating to education in England and Wales.
- Citation: 7 & 8 Geo. 6. c. 31
- Introduced by: R. A. Butler (Commons)
- Territorial extent: England and Wales (Note: Section 122(2).)

Dates
- Royal assent: 3 August 1944
- Commencement: 3 August 1944: parts I and V; 1 April 1945: parts II and IV; part III; (Note: Section 119.)
- Repealed: 1 November 1996
Other legislation
Amends	Elementary Education Act 1870; Education Act 1921
Repeals/revokes	Board of Education Act 1899; Education Act 1921; Education (Institution Children) Act 1923; Education (Local Authorities) Act 1931; Education (Necessity of Schools) Act 1933; Education Act 1936; Education (Deaf Children) Act 1937; Senior Public Elementary Schools (Liverpool) Act 1939; Education (Emergency) Act 1939
Amended by	Education (Miscellaneous Provisions) Act 1948; Criminal Justice Act 1948; Mental Health Act 1959; Charities Act 1960; Statute Law (Repeals) Act 1975; Education Act 1976; Statute Law (Repeals) Act 1978; Education Act 1980; Building Act 1984; Education Reform Act 1988; Further and Higher Education Act 1992; Education (Schools) Act 1992
Repealed by	Education Act 1996

Status: Repealed

Text of statute as originally enacted

Revised text of statute as amended

Education Act (Northern Ireland) 1947 (Note: Section 121.)
- Act of Parliament
- Parliament of Northern Ireland
- Long title: An Act to reform the law relating to education in Northern Ireland and for purposes connected with the said matter.
- Citation: 1947 c. 3 (N.I.)
- Territorial extent: Northern Ireland

Dates
- Royal assent: 27 March 1947
- Commencement: various (Note: Section 118.)
- Repealed: 1 April 1973
Other legislation
Repealed by	Education and Libraries (Northern Ireland) Order 1972

Status: Repealed

Text of statute as originally enacted

Revised text of statute as amended

Text of the Education Act (Northern Ireland) 1947 as in force today (including any amendments) within the United Kingdom, from legislation.gov.uk.

The Education Act 1944 (7 & 8 Geo. 6. c. 31) was an act of the Parliament of the United Kingdom which made major changes in the provision and governance of secondary schools in England and Wales. It is also known as the Butler Act after the President of the Board of Education, R. A. Butler. Historians consider it a "triumph for progressive reform", and it became a core element of the post-war consensus supported by all major parties. The Act was repealed in steps with the last parts repealed in 1996.

== Background ==
The basis of the act was a memorandum entitled Education After the War (commonly referred to as the "Green Book") which was compiled by Board of Education officials and distributed to selected recipients in June 1941. The President of the Board of Education at that time was Butler's predecessor, Herwald Ramsbotham; Butler succeeded him on 20 July 1941. The Green Book formed the basis of the 1943 White Paper, Educational Reconstruction which was itself used to formulate the 1944 act. The purpose of the act was to address the country's educational needs amid demands for social reform that had been an issue before the Second World War began. The act incorporated proposals developed by leading specialists in the 1920s and 1930s such as R. H. Tawney and William Henry Hadow. The text of the act was drafted by Board of Education officials including Griffiths G. Williams, William Cleary, H. B. Wallis, S. H. Wood, Robert S. Wood, and Maurice Holmes.

There was a desire to keep the churches involved in education but they could not afford to modernise without government help. By negotiation with the Archbishop of Canterbury, William Temple (1881–1944), and other religious leaders, a majority of the Anglican church schools became voluntary controlled and were effectively absorbed into the state system in return for funding. The act also encouraged non-sectarian religious teaching in secular schools. A third of the Anglican church schools became voluntary aided which entitled them to enhanced state subsidies whilst retaining autonomy over admissions, curriculum and teacher appointments; Roman Catholic schools also chose this option.

The legislation was enacted in 1944, but its changes were designed to take effect after the war, thus allowing for additional pressure groups to have their influence. Paul Addison argues that in the end, the act was widely praised by Conservatives because it honoured religion and social hierarchy, by Labour because it opened new opportunities for working class children, and by the general public because it ended the fees they had to pay for secondary education. State primary education had been free since the Elementary Education Act 1891; even after 1944 certain older grammar schools—the direct grant grammar schools—continued to charge fees but also admitted state pupils on scholarships.

== New policies ==
Butler designed the act as an expression of "One Nation Conservatism" in the tradition attributed to Disraeli, which called for paternalism by the upper class towards the working class. Butler later wrote in his 1971 memoirs that the 1944 act, like those of 1870, 1902 and 1918, did not “sweep the board clean” but rather “established a financial framework” within which local authorities could conduct such policies as were appropriate for their region.

The name “elementary school” was abolished as implying that the poorer children who tended to attend such schools would receive an inferior education. The act ended the traditional all-age (5–14) elementary sector, enforcing the division between primary (5–11 years old) and secondary (11–15 years old) education that many local authorities had already introduced. It abolished fees on parents for state secondary schools. It brought a more equitable funding system to localities and to different school sectors. The act renamed the Board of Education as the Ministry of Education, giving it greater powers and a bigger budget. While defining the school leaving age as 15, it granted the government the power to raise the age to 16 "as soon as the Minister is satisfied that it has become practicable", though the change was not implemented until 1973. It also brought in a new system for setting teacher salaries.

One of the results of the act was to increase the openness of secondary schools to girls and the working class, educating and mobilising them. Another result was that the percentage of children attending higher education tripled from 1% to 3%.

The act provided both for nursery schools and Further Education programmes through community colleges, offering education for both children and adults, a measure that was only followed through by a few LEAs such as the Cambridgeshire Village Colleges, Leicestershire Community Colleges and Coventry, Derbyshire and Nottinghamshire community schools.

Anglican schools were continued, but brought under increased state funding and control. Every state-funded school was required to begin the day with a nondenominational religious prayer. This clause was amended by the Education Reform Act 1988, which specified that the act of worship should be of a 'broadly Christian nature' unless such a message was deemed to be inappropriate for a particular school or group of children. The amendment also specified that the act of worship could now take place in classes, rather than the previous system of conducting worship in assemblies.

The act was supported by HORSA (Hutting Operation for the Raising of the School-Leaving Age) a building programme to provide 'hut'-style accommodation to meet the additional educational demand.

== School meals and milk ==
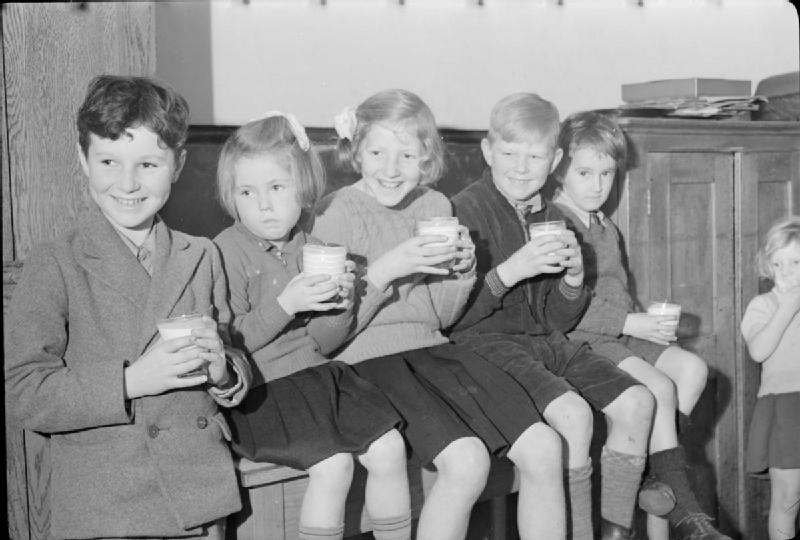
Five children drink their morning milk in a classroom in 1942.

The Education Act 1944 made it a duty of local education authorities to provide school meals and milk. The authority could remit the charge for the meal in cases of hardship. The Provision of Free Milk Regulations 1946 (SR&O 1946/1293), made under section 49 of the 1944 act, provided free school milk to all children under 18 in maintained schools from August 1946.

Education (Milk) Act 1971 (Note: Section 4(1).)
- Act of Parliament
- Parliament of the United Kingdom
- Long title: An Act to restrict the duty of education authorities to provide milk for pupils at educational establishments maintained by them or under their management and make further provision with respect to their power to do so; to restrict their power to secure provision of milk for pupils at other educational establishments; and for purposes connected therewith.
- Citation: 1971 c. 74
- Territorial extent: England and Wales; Scotland; (Note: Section 4(5).)

Dates
- Royal assent: 5 August 1971
- Commencement: 5 August 1971 (except section 2) (Note: The Acts of Parliament (Commencement) Act 1793); 1 August 1971 (section 2) (Note: Section 2(6))
- Repealed: 14 April 1980 (Note: The Education Act 1980 (Commencement No. 1) Order 1980 (SI 1980/489).)
Other legislation
Amends	Education (Scotland) Act 1962; Public Expenditure and Receipts Act 1968; Education (Handicapped Children) Act 1970
Repeals/revokes	Education (School Milk) Act 1970
Repealed by	Education Act 1980

Status: Repealed

Text of statute as originally enacted

In 1968 Edward Short, the Labour Secretary of State for Education and Science, withdrew free milk from secondary schools for children over eleven. His successor, Conservative Margaret Thatcher withdrew free school milk from children over seven in the Education (Milk) Act 1971 (c. 74). An outline budget left by Iain Macleod proposed abolishing free school milk completely; Thatcher fought against and managed to partially reverse this, only applying the cut to older children, however she still gained the nickname "Milk Snatcher" from the lower classes. In the April 1978 budget, the Labour Government was able to use an EEC subsidy on milk to restore free school milk to children aged between 7 and 11.

== Subsequent developments ==
The Law Commission proposed the consideration of consolidating the act in their second programme on consolidation and statute law revision, published on 20 April 1971.

The whole act was repealed by section 582(2) of, and part I of schedule 38 to, the Education Act 1996, which came into force on 1 November 1996.

== See also ==
- United Kingdom home front during World War II
- Political career of Rab Butler (1941–1951) for detailed narrative, mainly of Butler's negotiations with Church leaders
