= Elementary Education Act 1880 =

Act of the Parliament of the United Kingdom

Elementary Education Act 1880 (Note: Section 1.)
- Act of Parliament
- Parliament of the United Kingdom
- Long title: An Act to make further provision as to Byelaws respecting the attendance of Children at School under the Elementary Education Acts.
- Citation: 43 & 44 Vict. c. 23
- Territorial extent: United Kingdom

Dates
- Royal assent: 26 August 1880
- Commencement: 26 August 1880 (Note: The Acts of Parliament (Commencement) Act 1793.)
- Repealed: 1 October 1921
Other legislation
Amends	Elementary Education Act 1870; Elementary Education Act 1876
Repealed by	Education Act 1921

Status: Repealed

Text of statute as originally enacted

The Elementary Education Act 1880 (43 & 44 Vict. c. 23), or Mundella's Education Act, was an act of the Parliament of the United Kingdom which extended the Elementary Education Act 1870 (33 & 34 Vict. c. 75). It was one of the Elementary Education Acts 1870 to 1893.

Previous Elementary Education Acts had not required (and allowed potential difficulties in) the drawing up of bye-laws on school attendance by local school boards; the 1880 Act removed those difficulties, made the drawing up of such bye-laws mandatory, and allowed central government to impose such bye-laws where local boards had not done so. If the bye-laws specified minimum requirements (age and/or educational standard reached) to be attained before a child could leave school, it was illegal to employ a child under thirteen who did not satisfy one or the other requirement. The act therefore removed uncertainty on whether children being educated 'half-time' under the educational provisions of the Factory Acts were thereby excluded from the scope of the Elementary Education Acts (they were not).

"Mr Mundella's Education bill will be found to have done much to strengthen the weak points and fill up the admitted blanks of the Elementary Education Act. It is professedly intended more completely to provide bye-laws in connection with the schemes existing under the larger statute; but in reality it practically makes compulsory attendance at school a universal fact, and by quietly overriding the Factory Acts so far as these relate to young children, the educational system of the country is now as nearly as possible perfect."

== Subsequent developments ==
The whole act was repealed by section 172 of, and the seventh schedule to, the Education Act 1921 (11 & 12 Geo. 5. c. 51), which came into force on 1 October 1921.
