= Elementary Education Act 1870 =

Act of the Parliament of the United Kingdom

Elementary Education Act 1870 (Note: Section 1. Due to the repeal of this Act, it is now authorised by section 19(2) of the Interpretation Act 1978.)
- Act of Parliament
- Parliament of the United Kingdom
- Long title: An Act to provide for public Elementary Education in England and Wales.
- Citation: 33 & 34 Vict. c. 75
- Introduced by: William Forster (Commons)
- Territorial extent: England and Wales (Note: Section 2.)

Dates
- Royal assent: 9 August 1870
- Commencement: 9 August 1870 (Note: The Acts of Parliament (Commencement) Act 1793.)
- Repealed: 1 January 1961
Other legislation
Amended by	Elementary Education Act 1873; Elementary Education (Wenlock) Act 1874; Education Act 1921; Education Act 1944; Charities Act 1960
Repealed by	Elementary Education Act 1873; Elementary Education Act 1876; Elementary Education Act 1891; Statute Law Revision (No. 2) Act 1893; Education Act 1902; Education (London) Act 1903; Children Act 1908; Education Act 1918; Education Act 1921; Education Act 1944; Charities Act 1960

Status: Repealed

Text of statute as originally enacted

The Elementary Education Act 1870 (33 & 34 Vict. c. 75), commonly known as Forster's Education Act, was an act of the Parliament of the United Kingdom set the framework for schooling of all children between the ages of 5 and 12 in England and Wales. It established local education authorities with defined powers, authorized public money to improve existing schools, and tried to frame conditions attached to this aid so as to earn the goodwill of managers. It has long been seen as a milestone in educational development, but recent commentators have stressed that it brought neither free nor compulsory education, and its importance has thus tended to be diminished rather than increased.

The law was drafted by William Forster, a Liberal MP, and it was introduced on 17 February 1870 after campaigning by the National Education League, although not entirely to their requirements. In Birmingham, Joseph Chamberlain, not yet a Member of Parliament, was a prominent campaigner on the issue. However, like many grassroots Liberals, he opposed the bill because it was open to the possibility of subsidising Church of England schools with local ratepayers' money.

It was one of the Elementary Education Acts 1870 to 1893.

== Need ==
The act was passed partly in response to political factors, such as the need to educate the citizens who were recently enfranchised by the Reform Act 1867 (30 & 31 Vict. c. 102) to vote "wisely". It also came about due to demands for reform from industrialists, who feared that Britain's competitive status in world trade, manufacture and improvement was being threatened by the lack of an effective education system.

There were objections to the concept of universal education. One was that many people remained hostile to the idea of mass education. They claimed it would make labouring classes 'think' and thus attain class consciousness, possibly encouraging them to revolt. Others feared that handing children to a central authority could lead to indoctrination. Some poor people feared that mass education would equip people to defraud or mislead those without an education. Another reason was the vested interests of the church and other social groups. The churches were funded by the state with public money to provide education for the poor and did not want to lose that influence on youth.

It had been deduced from the United Kingdom Census 1861 that out of 4.3 million children of primary school age in England and Wales, 1 million were in purely voluntary (church) schools and 1.3 million were in state aided voluntary schools but 2 million had no schooling.

Lord Ripon (Lord President of the Council) and William Forster (Vice-President of the Council) were responsible for education in the Gladstone government of 1868–1874 and were keen to introduce a bill, as was Henry Bruce (Home Secretary). Although Gladstone was sympathetic to the argument that better education had helped the Prussians to their unexpected victory in the Austro-Prussian War (as he remarked, "Undoubtedly, the conduct of the campaign, on the German side, has given a marked triumph to the cause of systematic popular education"), he was a devout Anglican and did not want to see the existing Church of England schools absorbed into any kind of National Education system. Education was not a legislative priority after Irish Disestablishment and the First Irish Land Act. A bill was eventually introduced in the 1870 session although Gladstone was at least as concerned about the abolition of University Tests at the same time.

== Principles ==
Local authorities were required to make returns of the number of children in their area and existing educational provision. That was done by comparing the results of a census of existing school places with the number of children of school age recorded in the census. If there was a shortfall, a school board for the district would be created.

The boards were to provide elementary education for children aged 5–12 (inclusive).

Board members were elected by the ratepayers under a system of cumulative voting. The number of members was determined by the size of the population of the district. Each voter could choose three or more members from a list of candidates, and those with the highest number of votes were chosen for the existing number of seats available. A voter could cast all their votes for one person. Known as 'plumping', that ensured that religious and later political minorities could ensure some representation on the board. The franchise was different from national elections since female householders could vote and stand for office.

The boards financed themselves by a precept (a requisition) added to either the local poor rate or the municipal rate. They were also eligible to apply for capital funding in the form of a government loan.

The boards could make grants to existing church schools, as had occurred since the 1830s, and erect their own board schools or elementary schools.

Section 74 of the Act empowered boards to create a by-law and to table it before Parliament to make attendance compulsory unless there was an excuse, such as sickness, living more than three miles from a school or having been certified as reaching a certain standard of education. In 1873, 40% of the population lived in compulsory attendance districts.

All schools would be inspected by making use of the existing regime. The individual schools continued to be eligible for an annual government grant calculated on the basis of the inspection ('payment by results').

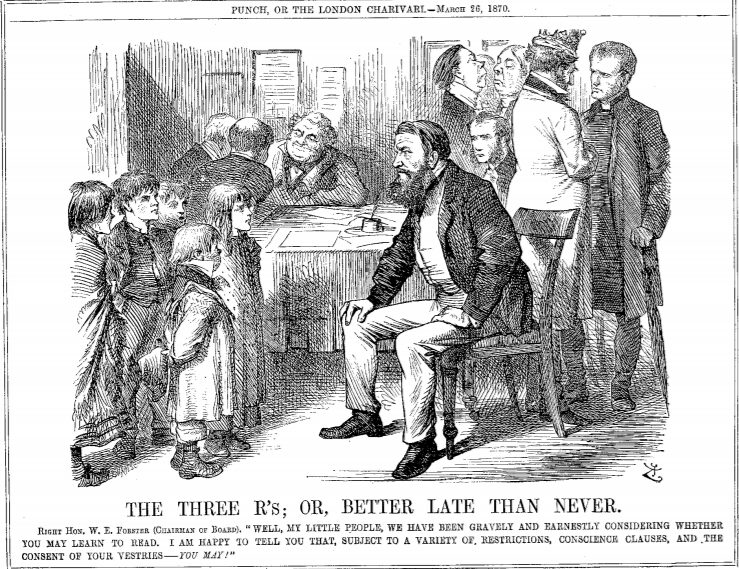
Punch comments on the new law. Children may learn to read--"subject to a variety of restrictions."

== Contentious provisions ==
Two provisions of the Act became, for religious reasons, matters of contention within the governing Liberal Party.

Firstly, nonconformists objected to their children being taught Anglican doctrine. As a compromise, William Cowper-Temple (pronounced "Cooper-Temple"), a Liberal MP, proposed for religious teaching in the new state schools to be non-denominational and so restricted in practice to learning the Bible and a few hymns. The Cabinet accepted that amendment on 14 June 1870, and Gladstone proposed it to the House of Commons two days later. It became the famous Cowper-Temple clause (Section 14 of the Act). HCG Matthew, the editor of Gladstone's diaries, believes that compromise to have hurt Gladstone more deeply than any other that he had to make. However, on 30 June 1870, a stronger amendment by Jacob Bright, a younger brother of John Bright, insisting that religious teaching not be for or against any denomination, was defeated by 251 votes to 130. The supporters of the amendment were all Liberals, and the government won only with Conservative support.

Section 7 also gave parents the right to withdraw their children from any religious instruction provided in board schools and to withdraw their children at any time to attend any other religious instruction of their choice.

Secondly, parents still had to pay fees for their children to attend school. Section 25 gave school boards the power to pay the fees of poor children, including those attending voluntary (church) schools. Although few school boards actually did so, the provision caused great anger among nonconformists, who saw it as a new source of local ratepayers' money being spent on Church of England schools. A large conference was held at Manchester in 1872 to lead resistance to the section, and one of the campaigners was the Birmingham politician Joseph Chamberlain, who emerged as a national figure for the first time.

The resulting splits (some education campaigners, including Chamberlain, stood for Parliament as independent candidates) helped to cost the Liberals the 1874 election.

== Effects ==
Between 1870 and 1880, 3,000 to 4,000 schools were started or taken over by school boards. The act required that every child should be taught in a reasonable building led by a qualified head teacher. 62 temporary prefabricated buildings were constructed in London. Newly certified teachers like Elizabeth Burgwin became the head of a temporary school in 1874 until she and the staff moved to the newly constructed Orange Street Girls' School in Southwark that same year.

Rural boards, run by parishes, had only one or two schools to manage, but industrial town and city boards had many. Rural boards favoured economy and the release of children for agricultural labour. Town boards tended to be more rigorous in their provisions, and by 1890, some had special facilities for gymnastics, art and crafts and domestic science.

There were ongoing political clashes between the vested interests of Church, private schools and the National Education League followers. In some districts, the creation of boards was delayed by local vote. In others, church leaders managed to be voted onto boards and restrict the building of board schools or divert the school rate funds into church schools.

Many factory owners feared the removal of children as a source of cheap labour. However, with the simple mathematics and English that they were acquiring, factory owners now had workers who could read and make measurements.

It is sometimes incorrectly claimed that the 1870 act forbid the use of the Welsh language at schools in Wales. The act does not mention Welsh and English was assumed to be the language of instruction; as had been the case in Welsh day schools since early in the 19th century. A trend towards more use of Welsh at schools in Welsh-speaking areas had begun prior to the act and continued after it.

The Act established the foundations of English elementary education although it was not taken up in all areas and would be more firmly enforced through later reforms. The state's Gladstonian liberalism became increasingly involved. Lord Sandon's Elementary Education Act 1876 (39 & 40 Vict. c. 70) gave parents a legal obligation to ensure that their children were educated. Following continued campaigning by the National Education League, the Elementary Education Act 1880 (43 & 44 Vict. c. 23) ("the Mundella Act") required attendance to the age of 10 everywhere in England and Wales, with various exemptions. In 1891, elementary schooling became free in both board and voluntary (church) schools.

== Commercial consequences ==
As a direct response to this Education Act, the founding father of British popular journalism, George Newnes, began his career in publishing in 1881 when he founded Tit-Bits. This was a weekly magazine which took the form of a mini-encyclopedia of information to appeal to the new generations of young readers.

Tit-Bits reached a circulation of 700,000 by the end of the 19th century and paved the way for popular journalism. Most significantly, the Daily Mail was founded by Alfred Harmsworth, a contributor to Tit-Bits, and the Daily Express was launched by Arthur Pearson, who worked at Tit-Bits for five years after winning a competition to get a job on the magazine.

== End of school boards ==
The school boards were abolished by the Balfour Education Act 1902, which replaced them with around 300 local education authorities (LEAs), by which time there were 5,700 board schools (2.6 million pupils) and 14,000 voluntary schools (3 million pupils). The LEAs remit included secondary education for the first time.

== Standards of education in 1872 ==
In areas served by school boards that had implemented by-laws requiring attendance, compulsory attendance until 13 was exempted if a child over 10 had been certified by the inspector as satisfying the required standard for that board. The standards required varied between 4th Standard (such as in Birmingham) and 6th Standard (such as in Bolton).

The following are the six Standards of Education contained in the Revised code of Regulations, 1872
STANDARD I
Reading	One of the narratives next in order after monosyllables in an elementary reading book used in the school.
Writing	Copy in manuscript character a line of print, and write from dictation a few common words.
Arithmetic	Simple addition and subtraction of numbers of not more than four figures, and the multiplication table to multiplication by six.
STANDARD II
Reading	A short paragraph from an elementary reading book.
Writing	A sentence from the same book, slowly read once, and then dictated in single words.
Arithmetic	The multiplication table, and any simple rule as far as short division (inclusive).
STANDARD III
Reading	A short paragraph from a more advanced reading book.
Writing	A sentence slowly dictated once by a few words at a time, from the same book.
Arithmetic	Long division and compound rules (money).
STANDARD IV
Reading	A few lines of poetry or prose, at the choice of the inspector.
Writing	A sentence slowly dictated once, by a few words at a time, from a reading book, such as is used in the first class of the school.
Arithmetic	Compound rules (common weights and measures).
STANDARD V
Reading	A short ordinary paragraph in a newspaper, or other modern narrative.
Writing	Another short ordinary paragraph in a newspaper, or other modern narrative, slowly dictated once by a few words at a time.
Arithmetic	Practice and bills of parcels.
STANDARD VI
Reading	To read with fluency and expression.
Writing	A short theme or letter, or an easy paraphrase.
Arithmetic	Proportion and fractions (vulgar and decimal).

== Scotland ==
Although universal primary education had been established in Scotland by the Education Act 1633, a similar act to the English Elementary Education Act was passed in 1872 for Scotland, the Education (Scotland) Act 1872. It required compulsory attendance from the start. It allowed post-elementary schools, but not public funding of them. There were around 1,000 school boards in Scotland at the time they were eventually abolished.

The 1872 Education Act brought in compulsory education for all children between 5 and 13, although fees still had to be paid until 1890. Teacher shortages continued and problems arose in areas where teachers who spoke no Gaelic attempted to teach children who had no English. Pupil-teachers could later qualify after attending Teacher Training College.

Local school boards made sure sufficient schools were built and that children attended them. After 1918, this became a county responsibility. State control increased the number of school inspectors after 1872. Medical and dental inspections were introduced after 1908, though reaching remote schools proved difficult. The leaving age was raised to 14 in 1883.

The new system was co-ordinated nationally by the Scotch Education Department with the curriculum emphasising the teaching of reading, writing, and arithmetic (the three ‘Rs’). The churches made a crucial contribution to the new system by handing over their schools without charge to the School Boards. At this time, the Free Church supported 548 schools across Scotland together with 584 teachers.

== In popular culture ==
The early 2000s rock band The Cooper Temple Clause was named after the provision familiar to generations of history students.

== See also ==
- History of education in England
- History of education in Scotland
- Education (Scotland) Act 1872
