= Secondary education =

Education between primary and higher education

Secondary education or post-primary education covers two phases on the International Standard Classification of Education scale: Level 2 (lower secondary education, less commonly junior secondary education) is the second and final phase of basic education, and Level 3 (upper secondary education or senior secondary education) is the phase immediately preceding tertiary education. Every country aims to provide basic education, but systems and terminology remain unique to each country. Secondary education typically takes place after six years of primary education and is followed by higher education, vocational education or employment. In most countries secondary education is compulsory, at least until the age of 16. Children typically enter the lower secondary phase around age 12. Compulsory education sometimes extends to age 20 and further.

Since 1989, education has been seen as a basic human right for a child; Article 28 of the Convention on the Rights of the Child states that primary education should be free and compulsory while different forms of secondary education, including general and vocational education, should be available and accessible to every child. The terminology has proved difficult, and no universal definition existed before ISCED divided the period between primary education and university into junior secondary education and upper secondary education.

In classical and medieval times, secondary education was provided by the church for the sons of nobility and to boys preparing for universities and the priesthood. As trade required navigational and scientific skills, the church expanded the curriculum and broadened enrollment. With the Reformation the state began taking control of learning from the church, and with Comenius and John Locke education changed from being repetition of Latin text to building up knowledge in the child. Education was for the few. Until the mid-19th century, secondary schools were organised to meet the needs of different social classes, with the labouring classes getting four years, the merchant class five years, and the elite getting seven years. The right to secondary education was codified after 1945, and some countries are moving toward mandatory, free secondary education for all youth under 19.

== Definition ==
Secondary education refers to the stage of formal education that follows primary education and precedes higher education. It is typically offered to students between the ages of 12 and 18, although the specific age range may vary depending on the educational system and country. Secondary education aims to provide students with a well-rounded education that prepares them for higher education or the workforce. It aims to develop their intellectual, social, and emotional skills, while also fostering critical thinking, creativity, and independence.

The 1997 International Standard Classification of Education (ISCED) describes seven levels used to compare education internationally. Within a country, these can be implemented in different ways, with different age levels and local denominations. The seven levels are:

1. Pre-primary education
2. Primary education or first stage of basic education
3. Lower secondary or second stage of basic education
4. (Upper) secondary education
5. Post-secondary non-tertiary education
6. First stage of tertiary education
7. Second stage of tertiary education

Within this system, Levels 1 and 2 – primary education and lower secondary, respectively – together form basic education. Beyond that, national governments may attach the label of secondary education to Levels 2 through 4 together, Levels 2 and 3 together, or Level 2 alone. These level definitions were created for statistical purposes and to allow the collection of comparative data nationally and internationally. They were approved by the UNESCO General Conference at its 29th session in November 1997. Though they may be dated, they do provide a universal set of definitions and remain unchanged in the 2011 update.

The start of lower secondary education is characterised by the transition from a single-class teacher delivering all content to a cohort of pupils to one in which content is delivered by a series of subject specialists. Its educational aim is to complete provision of basic education (thereby completing the delivery of basic skills) and to lay the foundations for lifelong learning.

Lower secondary education is likely to show these criteria:

- entry after some six years of primary education
- the requirement for more highly qualified teachers teaching only within their specialism
- exit to Level 3 courses, or vocational education, or employment after nine or more total years of education.

The end of lower secondary education often coincides with the end of compulsory education in countries where that exists.

(Upper) secondary education begins after completing basic education, which is also defined as completing lower secondary education. The educational focus is varied according to the student's interests and future direction. Education at this level is usually voluntary.

(Upper) secondary education is likely to show these criteria:

- entry after some nine years of basic education
- typical age at entry is between 14 and 16 years
- all teachers have level 5 qualifications in the subject they are teaching
- exit to Level 4 or 5 courses or to direct employment.

More subjects may be dropped, and increased specialism occurs. Completion of (upper) secondary education provides the entry requirements to Level 5 tertiary education, the entry requirements to technical or vocational education (Level 4, non-tertiary course), or direct entry into the workplace.

In 2012, the ISCED published further work on education levels, codifying particular paths and redefining the tertiary levels. Lower secondary education and (upper) secondary education could last between two and five years, and the transition between the two often would be when students were allowed some subject choice.

Terminology around secondary education systems varies by country. Secondary schools may also be called academies, colleges, gymnasiums, high schools, lyceums, middle schools, preparatory schools, sixth-form colleges, upper schools, or vocational schools, among other names. For further information about these terms and their definitions, see the section below, organised by country.

== History ==
A form of education for adolescents became necessary in all societies that had an alphabet and engaged in commerce. In Western Europe, formal secondary education can be traced back to the educational practices of ancient Athens. Though their civilisation was eclipsed and they were enslaved, Hellenistic Athenian teachers were valued in the Roman system. The Roman and Hellenistic schools of rhetoric taught the seven liberal arts and sciences – grammar, rhetoric, logic, arithmetic, geometry, music and astronomy – which were regarded as a preparation for the study at a tertiary level of theology, law and medicine. Private tutors at home prepared boys to enter these schools. Girls received tuition only at home.

England provides a good case study. When Augustine of Canterbury brought Christianity there in 597, no schools existed. He needed trained priests to conduct church services and boys to sing in the choir. He had to create both grammar schools that taught Latin, enabling the English to study for the priesthood, and song schools (choir schools) that trained the 'sons of gentlefolk' to sing in cathedral choirs. In the case of Canterbury (597) and Rochester (604), both still exist. Bede in his Ecclesiastical History of the English People (732) tells that the Canterbury school taught more than the 'intended reading and understanding of Latin', but 'the rules of metric, astronomy and the computus as well as the works of the saints'. Even at this stage, tension remained, as the church worried that knowledge of Latin would give students access to non-Christian texts it did not want them to read.

Over the centuries leading to the renaissance and reformation, the church was the main provider of secondary education. Various invasions and schisms within the controlling church challenged the focus of the schools, and the curriculum and language of instruction waxed and waned. From 1100, with the growth of the towns, grammar schools 'free' of the church were founded, and some church grammar schools were handed over to the laïty. Universities were founded that did not just train students for the priesthood.

=== Renaissance and Reformation ===
Whereas in mainland Europe the Renaissance preceded the Reformation, local conditions in England caused the Reformation to come first. The Reformation was about, among other things, allowing the laïty to interpret the Bible in their own way without priestly intervention, preferably in the vernacular. This stimulated the foundation of free grammar schools - who searched for a less constrained curriculum. Colonisation required navigation, mensuration, languages and administrative skills. The laïty wanted these taught to their sons. After Gutenberg in 1455 had mastered moveable metal type printing and Tyndale had translated the Bible into English (1525), Latin became a skill reserved for the catholic church and sons of conservative nobility. Schools started to be set up for the sons of merchants in Europe and the colonies too- for example Boston Latin Grammar School (1635).

Comenius (1592–1670), a Moravian protestant proposed a new model of education- where ideas were developed from the familiar to the theoretical rather than through repetition, where languages were taught in the vernacular and supported universal education. In his Didactica Magna (Great Didactic), he outlined a system of schools that is the exact counterpart of many western school systems: kindergarten, elementary school, secondary school, six-form college, university. Locke's Some Thoughts Concerning Education (1693) stressed the importance of a broader intellectual training, moral development and physical hardening.

The grammar schools of the period can be categorised in three groups: the nine leading schools, seven of them boarding institutions which maintained the traditional curriculum of the classics, and mostly served 'the aristocracy and the squirearchy'; most of the old endowed grammar schools serving a broad social base in their immediate localities which also stuck to the old curriculum; the grammar schools situated in the larger cities, serving the families of merchants and tradesmen who embraced change.

=== Industrialisation ===
During the 18th century their social base widened and their curriculum developed, particularly in mathematics and the natural sciences. But this was not universal education and was self-selecting by wealth. The industrial revolution changed that. Industry required an educated workforce where all workers needed to have completed a basic education. In France, Louis XIV, wrestled the control of education from the Jesuits, Condorcet set up Collèges for universal lower secondary education throughout the country, then Napoleon set up a regulated system of Lycee. In England, Robert Peel's Factory Act 1802 required an employer to provide instruction in reading, writing and arithmetic during at least the first four years of the seven years of apprenticeship. The state had accepted responsibility for the basic education of the poor. The provision of school places remained inadequate, so an Order in Council dated 10 April 1839 created the Committee of the Privy Council on Education.

=== Universal education ===
There was considerable opposition to the idea that children of all classes should receive basic education, all the initiatives such as industrial schools and Sunday schools were initially a private or church initiative. With the Great Exhibition of 1851, it became clear just how far behind the English education system had fallen.

Three reports were commissioned to examine the education of upper, middle and labouring class children. The Clarendon Commission sought to improve the nine Great Public Schools. The Taunton Commission looked at the 782 endowed grammar schools (private and public). They found varying quality and a patchy geographical coverage, with two thirds of all towns not having any secondary school. There was no clear conception of the purpose of secondary education. There were only thirteen girls' schools and their tuition was superficial, unorganised and unscientific. They recommended a system of first-grade schools targeted at a leaving age of 18 as preparation for upper and upper-middle-class boys entering university, second-grade targeted at a leaving age of 16 for boys preparing for the army or the newer professions, and third-grade targeted at a leaving age of 14 for boys of small tenant farmers, small tradesmen, and superior artisans. This resulted in the Endowed Schools Act 1869 which advocated that girls should enjoy the same education as boys.

The Newcastle Commission inquired "into the state of public education in England and to consider and report what measures, if any, are required for the extension of sound and cheap elementary instruction to all classes of the people". It produced the 1861 Newcastle Report and this led to the Elementary Education Act 1870 (33 & 34 Vict. c. 75) (Forster Act).

The school boards set up by the Elementary Education Act 1870 were stopped from providing secondary education by the Cockerton Judgement of 1899. The school leaving age at this time was 10. The Judgement prompted the Education Act 1902 (Balfour Act). Compulsory education was extended to 12. The new local education authorities (LEA)s that were formed from the school boards; started to open higher grade elementary schools (ISCED Level2) or county schools to supplement the endowed grammar schools. These LEAs were allowed to build second-grade secondary schools that in the main became the future secondary modern schools.

In the "1904 Regulations for Secondary Schools", the Board of Education determined that secondary schools should offer :

a four year subject-based course leading to a certificate in English language and literature, geography, history, a foreign language, mathematics, science, drawing, manual work, physical training, and, for girls, housewifery.

The Education Act 1918 (Fisher Act) extended compulsory full-time education to 14, and recommended compulsory part-time education from 14 to 18. The Hadow Report, "The Education of the Adolescent" (1926) proposed that there should be a break point at eleven, establishing primary schools and secondary schools.

The United Nations, founded in 1947, was committed to education for all but the definition was difficult to formulate. The Universal Declaration of Human Rights (1948) declared that elementary and fundamental education, which it did not define, was a right to be enjoyed by all. The Education Act 1944 (Butler Act) made sweeping changes to the funding of state education using the tripartite system, but was not allowed to tackle private schools. It introduced the GCE 'O'level at 16, and the 'A' at 18, but only raised the school leaving age until 15, making the exam inaccessible to the majority. But one year of ISCED Level 3 (Upper) secondary education was mandatory and free.

In 1972 the school leaving was raised to 16. The Education and Skills Act 2008, when it came into force in the 2013 academic year, initially required participation in some form of education or training until the school year in which the child turned 17, followed by the age being raised to the young person's 18th birthday in 2015. This was referred to as raising the "participation age" to distinguish it from the school leaving age which remains at 16. Thus the UK is following the ISCED Level 3 (Upper) secondary education guideline.

== Right to a secondary education ==
The United Nations was strong in its commitment to education for all but fell into linguistic difficulty defining that right.

"Article I: Purposes and functions 1. The purpose of the Organization is to contribute to peace and security by promoting collaboration among the nations through education, science and culture in order to further universal respect for justice, for the rule of law and for the human rights and fundamental freedoms which are affirmed for the peoples of the world, without distinction of race, sex, language or religion, by the Charter of the United Nations."

The Universal Declaration of Human Rights (1948) declared that elementary and fundamental education was a right to be enjoyed by all, but again could not define either elementary and fundamental education.

Article 26 :(1) Everyone has the right to education. Education shall be free, at least in the elementary and fundamental stages. Elementary education shall be compulsory. Technical and professional education shall be made generally available and higher education shall be equally accessible to all on the basis of merit.

It was assumed that elementary education was basic education—the entitlement for children—and fundamental education was a right for working people, but for a lawyer the definition is neither qualitative (stating what education means) or quantitative saying when it starts and when it is completed. The term secondary is not defined or mentioned. Together this has enabled countries to terminate free, compulsory, basic education at 11 or only continue education past eleven to boys.

Article 28, of the Convention on the Rights of the Child (1989) stated that primary education should be free and compulsory while different forms of secondary education, including general and vocational education, should be available and accessible to every child. Free education should be provided and financial assistance offered in case of need. In 1990, at Jomtien again tried to define the content basic education and how it should be delivered. 'Basic education' is defined as 'action designed to meet 'basic learning needs'. 'primary schooling' is considered as 'the main delivery system of basic education'. Which is explained in Principals for Action that:

addressing the basic learning needs of all means: early childhood care and development opportunities; relevant, quality primary schooling or equivalent out-of-school education for children; and literacy, basic knowledge and life skills training for youth and adults.'

The assumption being made that basic knowledge and life skills training for youth was the function of secondary education. This was codified by the ISCED documents. The Dakar Framework for Action 2010 goal 2 states: Ensuring that by 2015 all children, particularly girls, children in difficult circumstances and those belonging to ethnic minorities, have access to and complete free and compulsory (primary in the sense basic) education of good quality. The Dakar Framework for Action 2010 goal 5 states: Eliminating gender disparities in primary and secondary education by 2005, and achieving gender equality in education by 2015, with a focus on ensuring girls' full and equal access to and achievement in basic education of good quality.

In 1996, the Council of Europe adopted the Revised European Social Charter, which guarantees secondary education.

Malala Yousafzai, Nobel Peace Prize winner in a said in a 2017 interview that:

"My goal is to make sure every child, girl and boy, they get the opportunity to go to school." "It is their basic human right, so I will be working on that and I will never stop until I see the last child going to school."

In 2017, Human Rights Watch adopted a policy calling on states to take immediate measures to ensure that secondary education is accessible to all free of charge, and compulsory through the end of lower-secondary school. This was a call for secondary education to be included as part of the minimum core of the right to education, and seen as an immediate obligation.

== Future directions for secondary education ==
UNESCO believes that in order to prepare young people for life and work in a rapidly changing world, secondary-level education systems need to be re-oriented to impart a broad repertoire of life-skills. These skills should include the key generic competencies, non occupation-specific practical capabilities, information and communications technology, the ability to learn independently, to work in teams, entrepreneurship and civic responsibility.

GCED for the rule of law learning outcomes at the secondary level

They may be best instilled through a shared foundational learning period and by deferring the directing of students into academic and vocational streams for as long as possible, and then there should be flexibility to ensure the free movement of students between the streams depending on their aptitudes and inclinations. Accreditation in one stream should have equal recognition in the other as well as for access to higher education. This will equip young people with multiple skills so that they are prepared to enter and re-enter the workforce several times in their working lives, as wage employees or self-employed entrepreneurs, and to re-train themselves when their skills become obsolete.

It recognizes that there is no single model that will suit all countries, or even all communities in a given country. Secondary-level education policy should be under continuous review to keep in step with scientific and technological, economic and societal change.

=== Promoting the Rule of Law ===
Adolescence is associated with a time of significant growth where identity, belongingness, and socialization, especially among peer groups is particularly important. Secondary schools play an important role in youth's socialization, development and forming their ideas and approach to justice, democracy and human rights.

Education systems that promote education for justice, that is, respect for the rule of law (RoL) together with international human rights and fundamental freedoms strengthen the relationship between learners and public institutions with the objective of empowering young people to become champions of peace and justice. Teachers are on the front line of this work and, along with families, play a formative role in shaping the future of youth's attitudes and behaviours.

=== Career and Life Planning Education ===
Career and Life Planning Education (CLPE) activities as well as (Career) Development Education take place at secondary schools in Hong Kong. Students' transition from study to work is important in Hong Kong and career education in senior secondary schooling in this country is hence provided. Job shadowing is not yet done in their secondary schools however.

== By country ==
Each country has developed the form of education most appropriate for them. There is an attempt to compare the effectiveness by using the results from the PISA that, each third year, assesses the scholastic performance on mathematics, science, and reading of a representative sample of 5000 fifteen year olds from each country.

Names for secondary schools by country

- Argentina: secundaria or polimodal, escuela secundaria
- Australia: high school, secondary college
- Austria: Gymnasium (Ober- & Unterstufe), Hauptschule, Höhere Bundeslehranstalt (HBLA), Höhere Technische Lehranstalt (HTL)
- Azerbaijan: orta məktəb
- Bangladesh: Maddhomik Biddalay or secondary school (grades 6–10)
- Bahamas: junior high (grades 7–9), senior high (grades 10–12)
- Belgium: secundair onderwijs/école secondaire, humaniora/humanités
- Bolivia: educación primaria superior (grades 6–8) and educación secundaria, (grades 9–12)
- Bosnia and Herzegovina: srednja škola (literally middle school), gimnazija (gymnasium)
- Brazil: ensino médio (officially), segundo grau (formerly)
- Brunei: mostly sekolah menengah (English translation: secondary school), a few maktab (English translation: college)
- Bulgaria: cредно образование (grades 8–12)
- Canada: high school, junior high or middle school, secondary school, école secondaire, collegiate institute, polyvalente
- Chile: enseñanza media
- China: zhong xue (中学; literally, middle school), consisting of chu zhong (初中; 初级中学; literally low-level middle school) from grades 7–9 and gao zhong (高中; 高级中学; literally high-level middle school) from grades 10–12
- Colombia: bachillerato, segunda enseñanza (literally second learning)
- Croatia: srednja škola (literally middle school), gimnazija (gymnasium)
- Cyprus: Γυμνάσιο (gymnasium), Ενιαίο Λύκειο (lyceum)
- Czech Republic: střední škola (literally middle school), gymnázium (gymnasium), střední odborné učiliště
- Denmark: gymnasium
- Dominican Republic: nivel medio, bachillerato
- Egypt: Thanawya Amma (ثانوية عامة), (public secondary certificate)
- Estonia: upper secondary school, gymnasium, lyceum
- Fiji: high school, college
- Finland: lukio (Finnish) gymnasium (Swedish)
- France: collège (junior), lycée (senior)
- Germany: Gymnasium, Gesamtschule, Realschule, Hauptschule, Fachoberschule
- Greece: Γυμνάσιο (three years) (gymnasium), Γενικό Λύκειο (three years) (–1996, 2006–present), Ενιαίο Λύκειο (three years), (1997–2006) (lyceum)
- Hong Kong: secondary school (中學 zung1 hok6)
- Hungary: gimnázium (grammar school), középiskola (comprehensive school, literally middle school), szakközépiskola (vocational secondary school, literally professional middle school)
- Iceland: framhaldsskóli (menntaskóli, iðnskóli, fjölbrautaskóli) from grades 11–13. After elementary school (grades 1–10), students have the option of entering a framhaldsskóli (literally continuation school), which will take at least three years.
- India: secondary school or high school (grades 8–10), higher secondary school or senior secondary school or intermediate college or pre-university college (grades 11–12). It is known by various names in various Indian languages as follows:
  - Hindi (हिन्दी): माध्यमिक विद्यालय (Madhyamik Vidyalaya)
  - Bengali (বাংলা): মাধ্যমিক বিদ্যালয় (Madhyamik Vidyalaya)
  - Tamil (தமிழ்): மேல்நிலைப்பள்ளி (Melnilai Palli)
  - Telugu (తెలుగు): ద్వితీయోత్సాహ పాఠశాల (Dvitiya Vidyalaya) or ఉన్నత పాఠశాల (Unnata Patashala)
  - Marathi (मराठी): माध्यमिक शाळा (Madhyamik Shala)
  - Gujarati (ગુજરાતી): માધ્યમિક શાળા (Madhyamik Shala)
  - Kannada (ಕನ್ನಡ): ಪ್ರೌಢ ಶಾಲೆ (Prouḍha Shale)
  - Malayalam (മലയാളം): ഉപരി വിദ്യാലയം (Upari Vidyalayam) or ഹൈസ്കൂൾ (high school)
  - Punjabi (ਪੰਜਾਬੀ): ਮਾਧਿਮਕ ਵਿਦਿਆਲਿਆ (Madhyamik Vidyalaya)
  - Urdu (اردو): ثانوی اسکول (Sanooy school)
  - Odia (ଓଡ଼ିଆ): ମାଧ୍ୟମିକ ବିଦ୍ୟାଳୟ (Madhyamika Bidyalaya)
- Indonesia: sekolah menengah atas (SMA) (literally upper middle school), sekolah menengah pertama (SMP) (literally first middle school), sekolah menengah kejuruan (SMK) (vocational school, literally middle vocational school)
- Ireland: Meánscoil or secondary school
- Iraq: Madrasa I'dadia (مدرسة اعدادية), (preparatory school)
- Iran: Madrese Rahnamaie (مدرسه راهنمایی), (public secondary certificate)
- Israel: Bet Sefer Tichon (בית ספר תיכון) (literally middle school, but for grades 9-12)
- Italy: scuola secondaria di primo grado (three years) + scuola secondaria di secondo grado (five years): liceo, istituto tecnico, and istituto professionale
- Jamaica: high school (public school 7–13), college (grand-aided schools 7–13)
- Japan: chūgakkō (中学校; literally middle school), kōtōgakkō (高等学校; literally high school), chūtōkyōikugakkō (中等教育学校; secondary school) – In the pre-Meiji educational system, the equivalent was called "chūsei"
- Kazakhstan: орта білім беру мектебі (general secondary school), гимназия (gymnasium), лицей (lyceum), мамандандырылған мектеп (specialized school); basic secondary (grades 5–9) and upper secondary (grades 10–11)
- Latvia: vidusskola (literally middle school)
- Liechtenstein: gymnasium
- Lithuania: vidurinė mokykla (literally middle school), gimnazija (gymnasium), licėjus (lyceum)
- Macau: escola secundária (中學 zung1 hok6): schools with secondary sections have ensino secundário (中學教育 zung1 hok6 gaau3 juk6)
- Malaysia: secondary school or sekolah menengah, sometimes high school is used
- Malta: skola sekondarja or secondary school
- Mexico: educación secundaria y preparatoria
- Mongolia: бүрэн дунд сургууль
- Morocco: In Arabic: junior: Madrasa I'dadia Ta'hilia (مدرسة إعدادية تأهيلية / preparative qualificative school); senior: Madrasa I'dadia Thanawia (مدرسة إعدادية ثانوية / preparative secondary school) – in French: lycée
- Netherlands: middelbare school or voortgezet onderwijs
- New Zealand: high school, college, or secondary school
- Nigeria: secondary school, junior or senior secondary school
- Norway: videregående skole
- Pakistan: secondary school, higher secondary school
- Paraguay: educación media
- Peru: educación secundaria or escuela secundaria
- Philippines: mataas na paaralan, can be divided into junior high school (grades 7–10) and senior high school (grades 11–12)
- Poland:
  - generally: szkoła średnia or szkoła ponadpodstawowa (szkoła ponadgimnazjalna during the existence of gimnazjum middle schools)
  - specifically: liceum ogólnokształcące (comprehensive secondary school, grades 9–12), technikum (technical secondary school, grades 9-13)
- Portugal: 2º ciclo do ensino básico (grades 5–6), 3º ciclo do ensino básico (grades 7–9), and ensino secundário or liceu (grades 10–12)
- Romania: gimnaziu (grades 5–8), liceu (grades 9–12)
- Russia: средняя школа (literally middle school); junior middle school (compulsory, grades 5–9), senior middle school (voluntary, grades 10–11)
- Serbia: gymnasium (four years), professional schools (four years), vocational schools (three or four years)
- Slovakia : gymnázium (i.e. gymnasium, also translated as grammar school or high school)
- Slovenia: gimnazija (gymnasium), srednja šola (literally middle school)
- South Africa: high school or hoërskool
- South Korea: 중고등학교 (中高等學校・chung'godŭnghakkyo), 중등교육 (chungdŭng'gyoyuk; literally middle education), comprising 중학교 (chunghakkyo; the lower secondary school, grades 7–9, referred to as "middle school grades 1–3") and 고등학교 (kodŭnghakkyo; the upper secondary school, grades 10–12, referred to as "high school grades 1–3")
- Spain: educación secundaria, composed of two cycles: E.S.O. (Educación Secundaria Obligatoria, compulsory secondary education, four years, 7th to 10th grade) and bachillerato (non-compulsory secondary education, to years, 11th and 12th grade); formerly (for those born until 31 December 1983), primary education comprised up to the 8th grade and the secondary education was composed of two non-compulsory cycles: B.U.P. (Bachillerato Unificado Polivalente, three years, 9th to 11th grade) and C.O.U. (Curso de Orientación Universitaria, one year, 12th grade)
- Sri Lanka: junior secondary school, senior secondary school
- Sweden: gymnasium
- Switzerland: gymnasium, secondary school, collège or lycée
- Taiwan: junior high school (國民中學), senior high school (高級中學), vocational high school (高級職業中學), military school (軍校), and complete high school (完全中學)
- Thailand: matthayommasueksa (มัธยมศึกษา; literally secondary education)
- Trinidad and Tobago: secondary school, forms 1–5 (five years) or forms 1–6 (seven years)
- Turkey: lise
- Ukraine: gymnasium (compulsory, grades 5–9), lyceum (voluntary, grades 10–12)
- United Kingdom
  - England and Wales: secondary school (may be referred to as high school)
  - Northern Ireland: secondary school or grammar school
  - Scotland: high school or academy
- United States: high school (usually grades 9–12 but sometimes 10–12, also called senior high school), is always considered secondary education; junior high school or intermediate school or middle school (grades 6–8, 7–8, 6–9, 7–9, or other variations) are sometimes considered secondary education.
- Uruguay: liceo or secundaria (three years of compulsory education: ciclo básico; and three years of specialization: bachillerato diversificado, into: humanities (law or economics), biology (medicine or agronomy), science (engineering or rrchitecture), and art
- Venezuela: bachillerato
- Vietnam: trung học cơ sở (abbreviated THCS, literally basic middle school, equivalent to junior high school in the U.S.); trung học phổ thông (abbreviated THPT, literally general middle school, equivalent to senior high school in the U.S.)

== See also ==
- Education Index
- Category:Secondary education by country for secondary education in individual countries
- List of colleges and universities by country
- List of the oldest schools in the world
- List of schools by country
- List of countries by secondary education attainment
- Student orientation, can be used for allowing people to find their vocation
- Programme for International Student Assessment PISA test of 15yr old attainment

== Sources ==
- This article incorporates text from a free content work. Licensed under CC BY-SA 3.0 IGO. Text taken from Empowering students for just societies: a handbook for secondary school teachers, UNESCO, UNESCO. UNESCO.

== Bibliography ==
- "International Standard Classification of Education I S C E D 1997". www.unesco.org. 11 April 2013.
- Statistics, UNESCO Institute for (2012). International standard classification of education : ISCED 2012. Montreal, Quebec: UNESCO Institute for Statistics. ISBN 978-92-9189-123-8. Archived from the original (PDF) on 6 January 2019.
- "OPERATIONAL DEFINITION OF BASIC EDUCATION" (PDF). UNESCO. 2007. Archived from the original (PDF) on 15 February 2017.
- "Secondary Education Reform- Towards a convergence of Knowledge Acquisition and Skills Development" (PDF). ED-2005/WS/37: UNESCO. 2005.
- Gillard, Derek. "The History of Education in England – History". www.educationengland.org.uk.
- Iwamoto, Wataru (2005). "Towards a Convergence of Knowledge Acquisition and Skills Development" (PDF). uis.unesco.org. UNESCO. Archived from the original (PDF) on 25 May 2017.
- Leach; Gillard, Derek (1915). Cox, Charles (ed.). Leach – The Schools of Medieval England (1915) – full text (Antiquary's Books series ed.). London: Methuen. Archived from the original on 19 April 2015.
