= International rankings of Shanghai =

The following are international rankings of Shanghai by categories.

== Overall ==
Overall Rankings

Name	Year	Data	Place	Out of	Reference	Remarks
United Nations - Human Development Index	2014	0.852	32	188	[1]	
Economist Intelligence Unit - Hot Spots 2025 Benchmarking the future competitiveness of cities	2025		38	120	[22]	Beijing 49, Shenzhen 69, Tianjin 81, Qingdao 82, Dalian, Suzhou 83
Financial Times - Asia-Pacific Cities of the Future 2015/16	2016		8	163	[18]	Beijing 7
IESE - Cities in Motion Index	2016		93	181	[8]	Beijing 92, Guangzhou 104, Shenzhen 130, Chongqing 147, Wuhan 153, Shenyang 155, Suzhou 165, Tianjin 166, Harbin 169
Jones Lang LaSalle (JLL) - City Momentum Index	2016		6	120	[9]	Beijing 9, Shenzhen 12, Tokyo 14, Nanjing 15, Singapore >20
EIU - Best Cities Ranking	2012		33	70	[10]	Beijing 30, Shenzhen 34
EIU - Global City Competitiveness	2012		43	120	[20]	Beijing 39, Shenzhen 52, Guangzhou 64, Tianjin 75
UN Habitat - CPI						

== Education ==
Educational Rankings

Name	Year	Place	Out of	Reference
OECD Programme for International Student Assessment - Maths	2012	1	65	[12]
OECD Programme for International Student Assessment - Maths	2009	1	65	[11]
OECD Programme for International Student Assessment - Reading	2012	1	65	[12]
OECD Programme for International Student Assessment - Reading	2009	1	65	[11]
OECD Programme for International Student Assessment - Science	2012	1	65	[12]
OECD Programme for International Student Assessment - Science	2009	1	65	[11]
OECD Programme for International Student Assessment - Problem Solving	2012	6	44	[12]

== Environment ==
Environmental Rankings

Name	Year	Place	Out of	Reference	Remarks
EIU - Green City Index-Asian Green City Index	2010	15	22	[26]	Beijing 9, Guangzhou 11, Nanjing 14, Wuhan 16
Arcadis - Sustainable Cities Index	2016	74	100	[7]	Shenzhen 64, Beijing 73, Guangzhou 78, Tianjin 85, Chendu 93, Wuhan 94

== Globalisation ==
Global City Rankings

Name	Year	Place	Out of	Reference	Remarks
A.T. Kearney - Global Cities 2016	2016	20	125	[19]	Beijing 9, Guangzhou 71, Shenzhen 83, Nanjing 86, Tianjin 94
GaWC - Classification of cities 2012	2012	Alpha+ (6)	526	[21]	Beijing Alpha+(8), Guangzhou Beta+(50), Shenzhen Beta-(120)

== Economy and finance ==
Economic and financial rankings

Name	Year	Place	Out of	Reference	Remarks
Financial Times - Aerospace Cities of the future 2016/17	2016	3	72	[17]	Beijing 6, Tianjin 10
Z/Yen Group - The Global Financial Centres Index 20	2016	16	87	[16]	Shenzhen 22, Beijing 26, Qingdao 46, Dalian 48
The Atlantic - Global City Economic Power Index	2015	18		[23]	Beijing 18
Knight Frank LLP & the Citi Private Bank - The Wealth Report 2015	2015	5	40	[25]	Beijing 9
Institute for Urban Strategies at The Mori Memorial Foundation - Global Power City Index 2015	2015	17	40	[24]	Beijing 18

== Living ==
Living rankings

Name	Year	Place	Out of	Reference	Remarks
EIU – Global Liveability Ranking	2016	82	140	[2]	Suzhou 72, Beijing 73, Tianjin 77, Shenzhen 84, Dalian 88, Guangzhou 93, Qindao 98, M.China 49
Mercer – Quality of Living Survey	2016	101	230	[3]	Singapore 26, Tokyo 44, Seoul 73, Beijing 97, Shanghai 101
NUMBEO - Cost of Living Index 2016 Mid Year	2016	204	372	[14]	Shenzhen 207, Beijing 212
Expatistan - Cost of Living Index	2016	107	259	[15]	Shenzhen 162, Beijing 170, Guangzhou 184
The Economist - Safe Cities Index	2015	30	50	[13]	Singapore 2, Seoul 24, Tokyo 1, Hong Kong 11
