= Antiquary's Books series =

The Antiquary's Books series was edited by John Charles Cox, and published in London by Methuen & Co. It comprised some 28 titles. In relation to British parish history, it has been said that

"[...] several of Cox's series (1904–15) of Antiquary's Books retained their value, notably his own contributions on parish registers and churchwarden's accounts and Nathaniel Hone on manorial records.

== List of titles ==
Year	Title	Author
1904	English Monastic Life	Francis Aidan Gasquet
1904	Remains of the Prehistoric Age in England	Bertram Windle
1904	The Old Service-Books of the English Church	Christopher Wordsworth and Henry Littlehales
1904	Celtic Art in Pagan and Christian Times	John Romilly Allen
1905	Shrines of British Saints	J. Charles Wall
1905	Archaeology and False Antiquities	Robert Munro
1906	The Manor and Manorial Records	Nathaniel J. Hone
1906	English Seals	James Harvey Bloom
1905	The Royal Forests of England	John Charles Cox
	The Bells of England	John James Raven
1906	The Domesday Inquest	Adolphus Ballard
	Parish Life in Medieval England	Francis Aidan Gasquet
	The Brasses of England	Herbert W. Macklin
	English Church Furniture	John Charles Cox
1908	Folk-Lore as an Historical Science	George Laurence Gomme
	English Costume	George Clinch
1908	The Gilds and Companies of London	George Unwin
	The Medieval Hospitals of England	Rotha Mary Clay
1910	Old English Instruments of Music	Francis William Galpin
1911	The Roman Era in Britain	John Ward
1911	Romano-British Buildings and Earthworks	John Ward
	The Parish Registers of England	John Charles Cox
	Castles and Walled Towns of England	Alfred Harvey
1912	Old English Libraries	Ernest Albert Savage
1913	Ancient Painted Glass in England	Philip Nelson
1913	Churchwardens' Accounts from the Fourteenth Century to the Close of the Seventeenth Century	John Charles Cox
1914	The Hermits and Anchorites of England	Rotha Mary Clay
1915	The Schools of Mediaeval England	Arthur Francis Leach
