= Richard Saul Ferguson =

English antiquary (1837–1900)

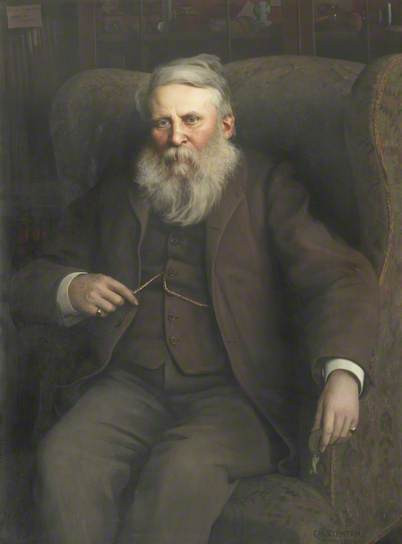
Richard Saul Ferguson

Richard Saul Ferguson (28 July 1837, Carlisle – 3 March 1900, Carlisle) was an English antiquary, specialising in the local history of Cumberland and Westmorland.

== Life ==
Ferguson was born on 28 July 1837, the elder son of Joseph Ferguson (1794–1880) of Carlisle, by his wife Margaret (died 2 November 1841), daughter of Silas Saul of Carlisle. The family settled in Carlisle about 1700, and founded the cotton industry in the city. He was educated at Carlisle Grammar School, entered Shrewsbury School in 1853, and was admitted at St. John's College, Cambridge, as a scholar on 14 March 1856. He graduated B.A. in 1860, M.A. in 1863, and LL.M. in 1864. He was admitted a student of Lincoln's Inn on 11 October 1858, and was called to the bar on 13 June 1862, when he commenced practice as an equity draughtsman and conveyancer, and joined the northern circuit.

He was examiner of civil law for Cambridge University in 1868–9. From January 1871 to June 1872 he travelled in Egypt, Australia, and America for the sake of his health, and on his return gave the public an account of his experiences in a series of letters in the Carlisle Patriot, which were reprinted, with the addition of Leaves from a Theban Guide Book, as Moss gathered by a Rolling Stone (Carlisle, 1873).

After his return Ferguson settled at Carlisle, and devoted himself to the study of local antiquities. He associated with others of similar tastes, including Michael Waistell Taylor, Robert Harkness, and Sir George Floyd Duckett. Already in 1866 he had assisted to found the Cumberland and Westmorland Archæological and Antiquarian Society, and from 1868 he edited the society's Transactions. Under his guidance nearly the whole of Cumberland and Westmorland were explored, and record made of castles, churches, houses, manuscripts, and old customs. On the death of Canon James Simpson in 1886, Ferguson succeeded him as president of the society. His own special period was that of the Roman occupation of Cumberland, and under his care the collection of Roman antiquities at the city museum, Tullie House, became extensive.

Ferguson was made a magistrate of the county of Cumberland in 1872, and a member of the Carlisle city bench in 1881. In 1886, he was elected chairman of quarter sessions. He was elected a member of the Carlisle city council in 1878, and took advantage of his position to gain access to the ancient muniments of the city, many of which he published. In 1881-2 he was chosen mayor and was re-elected in the following year. He was a strong supporter of the city privileges, and when county councils were instituted in January 1889 and he was elected a member for Carlisle, he lost no opportunity of urging the rights of the city. He was one of the promoters of the project by which Tullie House was taken for the use of the city, with a museum, a public library, a school of science and art, and art galleries. Under his influence William Jackson was induced to bequeath to the city the Jackson library, a valuable collection of local literature. In recognition of his services the corporation conferred upon him the honorary freedom of the city in 1896.

In 1887 Harvey Goodwin, bishop of Carlisle, appointed Ferguson chancellor of the diocese, a post that had not previously been held by a layman. Ferguson was elected a fellow of the Society of Antiquaries of London on 1 March 1877, member of the Royal Archæological Institute about 1878 and a fellow of the Society of Antiquaries of Scotland in 1880. In 1895 he was admitted an honorary member of the Glasgow Archæological Association. He was a vice-president of the Royal Archæological Institute and of the Surtees Society.

Ferguson died at Carlisle on 3 March 1900, at his residence, 74 Lowther Street. His portrait, painted by Mr. Sephton, was presented to him by the corporation of Carlisle in 1896. A replica hangs in the vestibule of Tullie House.

== Family ==
In August 1867 he married, at Kew, Georgiana Fanny Shelley, eldest daughter of Spencer Shelley of Richmond House, Kew, principal clerk of the treasury, and granddaughter of Sir John Shelley, 6th Baronet. He was separated from her in 1872, and divorced her in December 1877. By her he had one son, Spencer Charles Ferguson, who served as an officer in the Northumberland Fusiliers, and one daughter, Margaret Josephine Ferguson, who married in 1896 the Rev. Frederick Luke Holland Millard, vicar of Aspatria.

Captain Spencer Charles Ferguson (13 August 1868-13 Dec 1958) OBE, JP lived in 1910 at 37 Lowther Street, Carlisle only son of Chancellor Richard Saul Ferguson born at Richmond, Surrey. Educated Shrewsbury School followed by Cambridge University 1887. 2nd Lieut., Northumberland Fusiliers, 1890; Lieut., 1892; Capt., 1898. Served in the Sudan Campaign, 1898; present at the battle of Omdurman. In the South African War, 1899-1900. Major, Northumberland Fusiliers, 1904-6. Major, Westmorland and Cumberland Yeomanry, 1906-11. Mayor of Carlisle, 1912–13 and 1913-14. J.P. for Cumberland, 1902; for Carlisle, 1912; for Hants., 1929. Served in the Great War, 1914-19 (Major, Northumberland Fusiliers; mentioned in despatches; O.B.E.). 31 Mar 1901 living at no. 74 Lowther Street, Carlisle, unmarried 32 year old Captain in the Northumberland Fusiliers. marr. 12 Sep 1901 at Carlisle Cathedral, Caroline Agnes IRWIN b. Jan 1880

Eldest son - George Cuthbert Irwin Ferguson (9 June 1903 – 10 December 1941) Lieutenant Commander, RNVR. Gunnery Officer. Born Longtown, Cumberland. Died on sinking of H.M.S. PRINCE OF WALES by Japanese bombers off Kuantan, Malaya. Marr. New Forest July 1925, Betty Gillian Price of Copythorne, Hampshire (b. 10 August 1901 Taunton- 1983), daughter of Owen Talbot Price who lived at Ironshill Lodge, Lyndhurst, Hampshire,

== Works ==
Ferguson's first literary production was a series of articles on Early Cumberland and Westmorland Friends in the Carlisle Journal, a number of biographical sketches of leading quakers in the two counties. They were republished in book form in 1871 (London), and were followed in the same year by Cumberland and Westmorland M.P.'s from the Restoration to the Reform Bill of 1867 (London), a book containing a full political history of the counties. He also wrote:

- A Short Historical Account of Lanercost (London, 1870), (with Charles John Ferguson)
- Carlisle, London, 1889. In the 'Diocesan Histories' series of the Society for Promoting Christian Knowledge
- A History of Cumberland. London, 1890. In Elliot Stock's series of Popular County Histories.
- 'An Archæological Survey of Cumberland and Westmorland', Archæologia of the Society of Antiquaries, vol. liii (1893)
- A History of Westmorland, London, 1894. In the 'Popular County Histories' series
- Carlisle Cathedral, London, 1898. In the 'English Cathedrals' series.

Ferguson edited a series of works for the Cumberland and Westmorland Archæological Society:

- Miscellany Accounts of the Diocese of Carlisle, by William Nicolson, 1877.
- Old Church Plate in the Diocese of Carlisle, with the Makers and Marks, 1882
- An Accompt of the most considerable Estates and Families in the County of Cumberland, by John Denton, 1887 (Tract Series, No. 2)
- (with W. Nanson) Some Municipal Records of the City of Carlisle, 1887.
- Description of the County of Cumberland, by Sir Daniel Fleming (Tract Series, No. 3)
- A cursory Relation of all the Antiquities and Familyes in Cumberland, 1890 (Tract Series, No. 4)
- Account of the City and Diocese of Carlisle, by Hugh Todd, 1890 (Tract Series, No. 5)
- Notitia Ecclesiæ Cathedralis Carliolensis, by Todd, 1892 (Tract Series, No. 6).
- A Boke off Recorde … concerning the Corporation of Kirkbiekendall … 1575, 1892.
- Testamenta Karleolensia, 1893.
- The Royal Chartes of the City of Carlisle, 1894.

Ferguson contributed a biographical notice of Michael Waistell Taylor to Taylor's Old Manorial Halls of Cumberland and Westmorland, 1892, and a preface to Hugh Alexander Macpherson's Vertebrate Fauna of Lakeland, 1892. He was a contributor to the Antiquary, Reliquary, and the Archæologia of the Society of Antiquaries.
