= Thomas William Shore =

English geologist and antiquarian

Thomas William Shore, sometimes given as William Thomas Shore (5 April 1840 – 15 January 1905) was an English geologist and antiquarian who founded the Hampshire Field Club in 1885.

== Life ==
Born on 5 April 1840 at Wantage, he was son of William Shore, architect, by his wife Susannah Carter. Brought up at Wantage, he became (about 1864) organising secretary to the East Lancashire Union of Institutions at Burnley. In 1867 he was sent (with others) by the Science and Art Department to the Paris Exhibition to report on scientific and technical education, and gave evidence on the subject before a select committee of the House of Commons in 1868.

In 1873 Shore was appointed secretary to the Hartley Institution at Southampton and curator of the museum, and later became executive officer of the Institution. In 1882 he was secretary of the geological section of the Southampton meeting of the British Association. He was elected fellow of the Geological Society on 3 April 1878. Both as a geologist and an antiquary he was considered an authority on Hampshire.

In 1896 Shore moved to London and founded the Balham Antiquarian Society. He died suddenly at his residence, 157 Bedford Hill, Balham, on 15 January 1905, and was buried at the cemetery of St. Mary Extra, Woolston, Southampton.

== Works ==
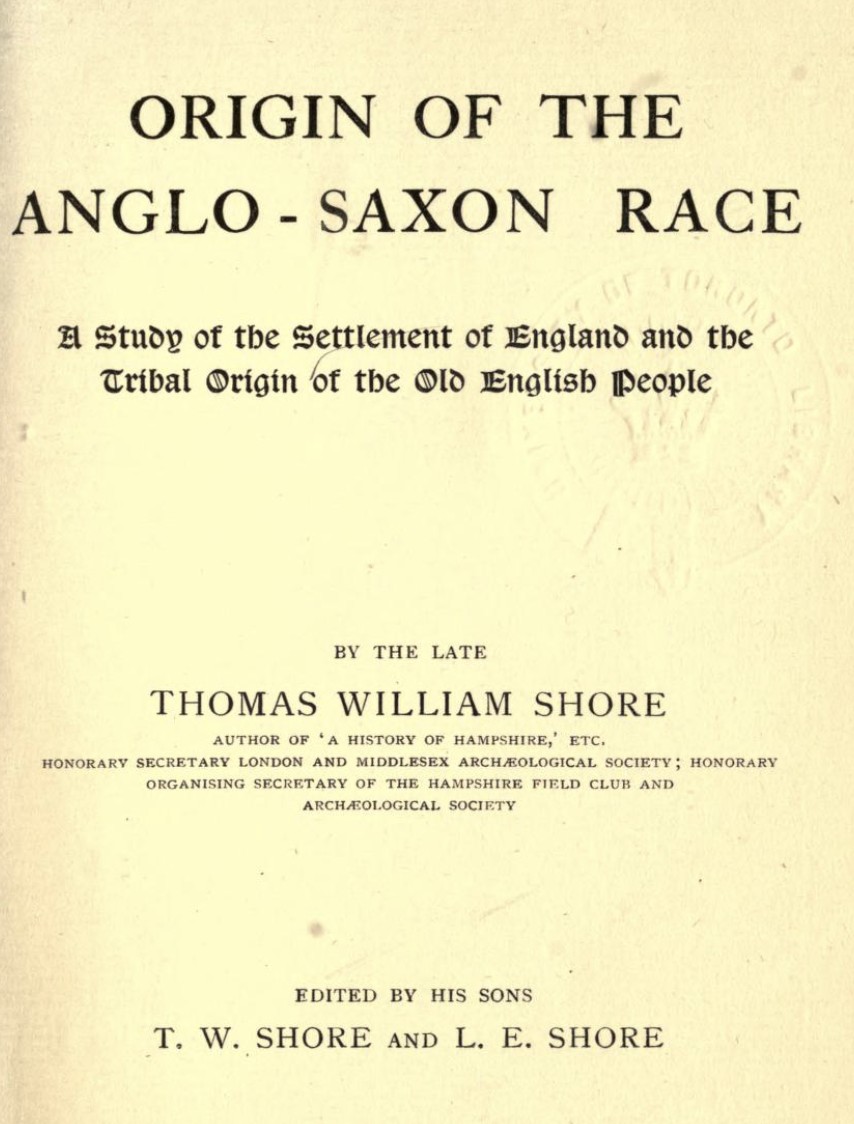
Title page, Origin of the Anglo-Saxon Race, 1906

Shore published:

- Guide to Southampton and Neighbourhood, 1882.
- Letter-press description to Vestiges of Old Southampton, by Frank McFadden, 1891.
- A History of Hampshire, including the Isle of Wight (Popular County Histories), 1892.

At his death he was engaged on Origin of the Anglo-Saxon Race, which was edited posthumously by his sons.

Shore was the founder of the Hampshire Field Club and Archaeological Society, and remained its honorary secretary until his death. He contributed papers to the society's Transactions, including "Ancient Hampshire Forests" (1888), "The Clays of Hampshire and their Economic Uses" (1890), and "Hampshire Valleys and Waterways" (1895). The Shore Memorial Volume (pt. i. 1908, ed. G. W. Minns), undertaken by the Society, contains his contributions to the society and other papers. Shortly before 1901 he became joint honorary secretary of the London and Middlesex Archæological Society, and contributed to its Transactions a series of papers on "Anglo-Saxon London and Middlesex".

== Family ==
On 24 January 1861 Shore married Amelia Lewis of Gloucester, who died on 31 May 1891. They had two sons: William Shore, M.D., dean of the medical school of St. Bartholomew's Hospital, and Lewis Erle Shore, lecturer on physiology at Cambridge, and three daughters.

== Notes ==
Attribution

This article incorporates text from a publication now in the public domain: Lee, Sidney, ed. (1912). "Shore, William Thomas". Dictionary of National Biography (2nd supplement). Vol. 3. London: Smith, Elder & Co.
