= John James Raven =

John James Raven (25 June 1833–20 September 1906) was an English cleric and head, known as a writer on campanology.

== Life ==
Born on 25 June 1833 at Boston, Lincolnshire, he was the eldest son of eight children of John Hardy Raven, rector of Worlington, Suffolk, and his wife Jane Augusta, daughter of John Richman, attorney, of Lymington, Hampshire; a younger brother, the Rev. John Hardy Raven (1842–1911), was head of Beccles school. He entered St Catharine's College, Cambridge, on 18 October 1853, and migrated on 17 December following to Emmanuel College (where he was awarded first an Ash exhibition and subsequently a sizarship). He graduated B.A. as a senior optime in the Mathematical Tripos of 1857, proceeding M.A. in 1860 and D.D. in 1872.

In 1857, Raven was appointed second master of Sevenoaks grammar school and was ordained curate of the parish church there. In 1859, he became head of Bungay grammar school, a post in the gift of Emmanuel College. There he raised money for a new building, which was opened in 1863. From 1866 to 1885 he was head of Yarmouth grammar school. He served for some time as curate of Yarmouth parish church and was from 1881 to 1885 vicar of St. George's in that town. In 1885, he was presented by the Master of Emmanuel to the consolidated vicarage of Fressingfield and rectory of Withersdale in Suffolk, and was admitted on 23 March 1895 (under a dispensation) to the vicarage of Metfield in the same county.

Raven was chosen honorary canon of Norwich Cathedral in 1888, and rural dean of Hoxne in 1896, and a co-opted member of the County Education Committee on its formation in 1902. He served from 1881 till his death on the committee of the Norfolk and Norwich Archæological Society, which he joined in 1871, was a vice-president of the Suffolk Institute of Archæology, and was elected Fellow of the Society of Antiquaries of London on 23 April 1891. He died at Fressingfield vicarage on 20 September 1906, and was buried in the churchyard. A reredos was erected to his memory in the church. His pupils at Yarmouth presented him with his portrait by Alfred Lys Baldry (now belonging to his eldest son at Fressingfield), and a tower at Yarmouth school commemorated his successful headship. His fine library of county and bell literature was sold at Fressingfield in November 1906.

== Works ==
While a youth Raven studied the bells of the churches near his home at Worlington and contributed to an Ecclesiastical History of Suffolk in 1854. He was president of the Norwich Diocesan Association of Ringers, and published books on The Church Bells of Cambridgeshire (Lowestoft, 1869; 2nd edit. Camb. Antiq. Soc. 1881), The Church Bells of Suffolk (1890), and The Bells of England (in the Antiquary's Books series, 1906). He published also The History of Suffolk (in the Popular County Histories series, 1895), and Mathematics made easy: Lectures on Geometry and Algebra (1897). He also compiled the "Early Man" section of the Victoria County History for Suffolk.

== Family ==
Raven married on 19 March 1860, at Mildenhall parish church, Suffolk, Fanny, youngest daughter of Robert Homer Harris of Botesdale, and had, with two daughters, seven sons, of whom three took holy orders.

== Notes ==
Attribution

This article incorporates text from a publication now in the public domain: Lee, Sidney, ed. (1912). "Raven, John James". Dictionary of National Biography (2nd supplement). Vol. 3. London: Smith, Elder & Co.
