= Hugh Todd (author) =

English cleric and academic (1657–1728)

Hugh Todd (c.1657–1728) was an English cleric and academic, known also as an antiquarian and author.

== Life ==
Born at Blencow, Cumberland, about 1658, he was son of Thomas Todd, rector of Hutton in the Forest, who was ejected by parliamentary sequestrators and imprisoned at Carlisle. On 29 March 1672, he matriculated at The Queen's College, Oxford, graduating B.A. On 4 July 1677, and becoming taberdar of the college. In the following year, on 23 December, he was elected a fellow of University College. He proceeded M.A. on 2 July 1679, and accumulated the degrees of B.D. and D.D. on 12 December 1692.

In 1684, Todd became vicar of Kirkland in Cumberland, but resigned the charge on being installed a prebendary of the see of Carlisle on 4 October 1685. In 1685, he was collated to the vicarage of Stanwix in the same county, which he resigned in 1688, on becoming rector of Arthuret, presented by Richard Graham, 1st Viscount Preston. In 1699, he was also appointed vicar of Penrith.

In 1702, William Nicolson became bishop of Carlisle. From early in his episcopate, he clashed with Todd, who was uncompromising. After several minor disputes, in one of which Todd made his curate a churchwarden, Todd, with the dean Francis Atterbury, undertook to defend the chapter against the bishop, who exhibited articles of inquiry against them. Todd denied the right of visitation to the bishop, declaring that it belonged to the crown. For this conduct, he was first suspended and then excommunicated by Nicolson, but continued to officiate in his parish as priest, ignoring the bishop's action.

The bishops were alarmed by Todd's rejection of episcopal authority, and a bill was passed in parliament in 1708 as the Cathedral Act, to establish their rights of visitation more firmly. After its passage, the sentence of excommunication on Todd was removed. The following day Sir James Montague, a Member of Parliament for Carlisle, held a dinner for Nicolson and Todd, at which they were reconciled.

Todd died in Penrith on 6 October 1728.

== Works ==
Todd contributed "The Description of Sweden" to Moses Pitt's English Atlas (1680). In the Philosophical Transactions he published "An Account of a Salt Spring on the Banks of the River Weare in Durham", and "An Account of some Antiquities found at Corbridge, Northumberland". He translated "How a Man may be Sensible of his Progress in Virtue", for Plutarch's Morals, translated from the Greek by several hands (1684), and the life of Phocion for The Lives of Illustrious Men, written in Latin by Cornelius Nepos, and done into English by several hands (Oxford, 1684).

Todd published a number of poems. He also assisted John Walker in compiling his Sufferings of the Clergy. He left manuscripts, including: Notitia Ecclesiæ Cathedralis Carliolensis, et Notitia Prioratus de Wedderhal, 1688, which was edited for the Cumberland and Westmoreland Antiquarian and Archæological Society by Richard Saul Ferguson (Tract Ser. No. 6, Kendal, 1892); and An Account of the City and Diocese of Carlisle, 1689, also edited by Ferguson for the Society (same series No. 5, Kendal, 1891). His Cumbrian manuscripts were used by Walter Fletcher for his Diocesan Book, published in 2015 by the Surtees Society.

== Family ==
Todd married in 1700 Lucy Dalston (d. 1733), eldest daughter of Christopher Dalston. Their daughter Catherine married Archibald Hope of Rankeillor, and was painted by Allan Ramsay; he was a son of Sir Thomas Hope, 8th Baronet, a Jacobite who saw the Battle of Culloden, and died in 1769, and was also painted by Ramsay.
