= Popular County Histories =

The Popular County Histories series was a set of English county histories issued by Elliott Stock & Co. from 1885.

Year	County	Author
1887	Berkshire	Charles Cooper King
1897	Cambridgeshire	John William Edward Conybeare
1890	Cumberland	Richard Saul Ferguson
1886	Derbyshire	John Pendleton
1886	Devonshire	Richard Nicholls Worth
1892	County of Durham	John Roberts Boyle
1892	Hampshire	Thomas William Shore
1894	Lancashire	Henry Fishwick
1885	Norfolk	Walter Rye
1895	Northumberland	Cadwallader John Bates
1891	Nottinghamshire	Cornelius Brown
1899	Oxfordshire	John Meade Falkner
1895	Suffolk	John James Raven
1900	Surrey	Henry Elliot Malden
1889	Warwickshire	Samuel Timmins
1894	Westmorland	Richard Saul Ferguson
