= William Nicolson =

English cleric, linguist, antiquarian, and diarist (1655–1727)

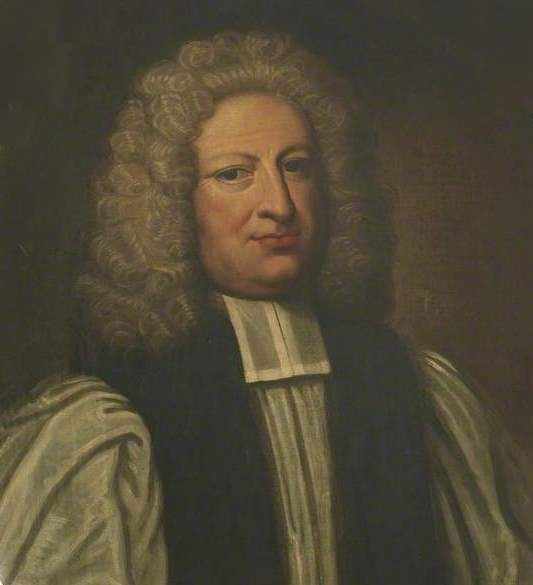
Bishop Nicolson, portrait attributed to Michael Dahl.

William Nicolson (1655–1727) was an English churchman, linguist and antiquarian. As a bishop he played a significant part in the House of Lords during the reign of Queen Anne, and left a diary that is an important source for the politics of his times. He was a versatile scholar, involved in numerous collaborations and contributing uncredited in the work of others.

== Early life ==
He was born in Plumbland, Cumberland, the son of Joseph Nicolson, who was rector there, and his wife Mary Brisco, and was educated at the school in nearby Dovenby. He went up to Queen's College, Oxford and graduated BA in 1676, MA in 1679. He became a Fellow of the college, holding the post from 1679 to 1682.

== Journey to Germany ==
Nicolson visited the University of Leipzig to learn German, supported by Joseph Williamson. He travelled out in July 1678 via Holland, in the entourage of Robert Bruce, 1st Earl of Ailesbury. As companion he had David Hanisius; also of the party was Nicholas Oudart. He went with Hanisius to Schloss Wolfenbüttel, where Hanisius was librarian in charge of the major collection left by Augustus the Younger, Duke of Brunswick-Lüneburg, who had died in 1666. Staying also on the way at Blankenburg with Rudolph Augustus, Duke of Braunschweig-Wolfenbüttel, Nicolson reached Leipzig in at the end of September.

Of the scholars he met in Leipzig, Nicolson was impressed by Johann Benedict Carpzov II, and Jakob Thomasius. He also admired Johann Adam Schertzer. He studied there until February 1679, when he turned for home. In his English Historical Library, he recommended a number of German authors: Melchior Goldast and Heinrich Lindenbrog on laws, Justus Georg Schottelius on early German as language.

== Priest and churchman ==
Nicolson was ordained as a deacon in 1679 and made Vicar of Torpenhow in 1681; he also became prebendary of Carlisle Cathedral in 1681, and Archdeacon and rector of Great Salkeld in 1682.

Francis Atterbury, high church and High Tory, courted controversy in 1696 with an anonymous pamphlet suggesting Convocation should meet in parallel with Parliament. Nicolson was one of a group of churchmen opposing Atterbury's views, including Edmund Gibson, White Kennett and William Wake. Atterbury made offensive remarks about Nicolson in print.

== Bishop and chapter at Carlisle ==
In 1702 Nicolson, a Tory moderate, was appointed bishop of Carlisle. He had cultivated the support of local Tories: Sir Christopher Musgrave, 4th Baronet, Thomas Tufton, 6th Earl of Thanet who was heir to the Cumbrian Clifford estates, Colonel James Grahme the brother of Richard Graham, 1st Viscount Preston. His Miscellany Accounts of his diocese, compiled in 1707–4, were published in 1877 by Richard Saul Ferguson. They were from his own observations, or from trusted witnesses. He found in 1703 the neglected Holmcultram Abbey full of water. Charles Murray Lowther Bouch used Nicolson's records to conclude that 70% of the churches in the diocese were then in tolerable condition, with 10% very bad.

Atterbury was appointed Dean of Carlisle in 1704, through the influence of Robert Harley. On a single visit to Carlisle Atterbury, who had picked a fight with Nicolson over a chapter matter, lost all support except with Hugh Todd. Nicolson tried to have the appointment suppressed, but Atterbury remained in post, based in London until 1710. The proxy quarrel with Todd escalated: and when Nicolson excommunicated Todd, Todd began a court case of 1707–8, argued on the foundation of Carlisle Cathedral based on an Augustinian abbey, by a statute of Henry VIII. Todd won his case, but Nicolson and allies had Parliament pass in March 1708 the Cathedral Act, clarifying the bishop's right of visitation for the cathedrals in the scope of the statute. The following day Sir James Montague, a Member of Parliament for Carlisle, held a dinner for the two clerics at which they were reconciled.

== Later life ==
In 1713 White Kennett addressed to Nicolson a pamphlet on Thomas Merke, bishop of Carlisle in the time of Richard II. It dealt with The Hereditary Right of the Crown of England Asserted, an anonymous Jacobite pamphlet by George Harbin. Nicolson had been moving in the Whig direction in politics for some years, paying off debt to the Musgrave family, associating with London Whigs and in 1709 dining with the Earl of Carlisle at Naworth Castle, and supporting the Whig side in the 1710 British general election.

During the 1715 Jacobite Rebellion, Nicolson was in Carlisle from 23 September. Jacobite forces under Mackintosh of Borlum and Thomas Forster marched south from the Scottish border on 1 November, through Longtown and Brampton. On 2 November Henry Lowther, 3rd Viscount Lonsdale with Nicolson were with the posse comitatus mustering at Penrith that confronted them; but the militia fled and Nicolson was driven back in his coach to Rose Castle.

Nicolson served as Lord High Almoner to George I of Great Britain from 1716 to 1718. He was translated to Derry in 1718. There he was in an uncomfortable position in relation to the Archbishop of Dublin, William King: the "English party"—clerics not of Irish birth, assumed Hanoverian supporters and loyal to Dublin Castle—were out of favour with the Anglo-Irish clergy. Nicolson made a friend of Henry Downes, and got onto good terms with the politician William Conolly. In the Irish House of Lords he found an ally in John Evans. But his health was failing, and when Archbishop Thomas Lindsay of Armagh died, he made clear to William Wake, now of Canterbury, that he had no interest in succeeding him.

In 1727 Nicolson was nominated archbishop of Cashel and Emly, following the death on 1 January of Archbishop Palliser, but died in Derry before he could assume charge. He was buried in Derry Cathedral.

== Scholar ==
Nicholson himself referred to his interest in "septentrional learning". According to Burke, he was known as the "Star of the North".

=== Early work ===
John Fell appointed Nicolson editor of the manuscript "Northern Dictionary" of Francis Junius, who was an Oxford resident from 1676 to autumn 1677. He made a transcription, with additions, of Junius's collection of old German materials. Nicolson after his return to Oxford held a lectureship at Queen's in Anglo-Saxon set up by Williamson, and gained a reputation in the area.

While he was in Germany, Johann Adam Schertzer asked Nicolson to translate an essay by Robert Hooke. It was published in 1679 as Conamen ad motum Telluris probandum.

=== Runes and Northumbria ===
In his period as parish priest, Nicolson took an interest in runic scripts. In 1685 he visited the Bewcastle Cross. He also saw the runic inscription on the baptismal font at Bridekirk church, and he described both in published letters, to Obadiah Walker and William Dugdale respectively. He identified a coin of Ralph Thoresby as showing runes: it was from Sweyn II of Denmark's mint at Lund. Some years later he provided a copy of the Ruthwell Cross fragments to George Hickes, based on an examination in 1797, and of some value still for the runic inscription: Hickes published it in 1703, as a plate in his Thesaurus vol. iii.

In 1691 Nicolson wrote in a letter to Thoresby of his strong interest in the recovery of the history of the Kingdom of Northumbria, of which the crosses were relics. He did not in fact write such a history. The interest stayed with him, however. He made collections, and acquired papers of the Cumbrian antiquarian Thomas Machell.

Nicolson did carry out extended field-work trips in the summer months, through the 1690s, as a naturalist as well as an antiquarian. His beat spread out over northern England.

=== Historian ===
In 1694 Nicolson expressed in a letter to Ralph Thoresby a strong interest in the model of the Uppsala antiquarian group (Academy of Antiquities) founded in 1667 by Magnus Gabriel De la Gardie. He complained also that "our histories hitherto have been most lazily written". The year before he had blamed too individualist an approach. His own major works were of critical bibliography: the Historical Library, beginning with the English Historical Library in volumes of 1696, 1697 and 1699 for the first edition. It was followed by the Scottish Historical Library, 1702; and the Irish Historical Library, 1724. There were complete later editions, in 1732 and 1776. Nicolson, even if he kept in touch with Edward Lhuyd and had an interest in the links between Cumbria and North Wales, did not divide Wales off from England in the Library.

There was also the Leges Marchiarum or Border Laws (1705, new ed., 1747). This work was topical in the run-up to the Acts of Union 1707. Nicolson disagreed with William Atwood, on the relative standing of England and Scotland. The 1704 book The Superiority and Direct Dominion of the Imperial Crown of England over the Crown and Kingdom of Scotland by Atwood was attacked in Leges Marchiarum. A technical point at issue was the "Homage" of Malcolm IV of Scotland, which according to Nicolson related only to English counties held by the Scottish Crown.

=== Preservation of records ===
Nicolson showed zeal in collecting and guarding manuscripts and other official documents. During his time at Queen's College, Oxford, in 1678, Thomas Machell had put him to transcribing records stored in the Tower of London. When Machell died in 1698, Nicolson took on his antiquarian papers and bound them, on behalf of Machell's family. They were used by later county historians of Cumberland.

Soon after Nicolson came into the House of Lords in 1702, he took an interest in the records in the Tower, and those in the Jewel House of Old Palace Yard, which contained the Parliament Office. He was recruited to the select Committee on the Public Records, chaired by Charles Montagu, 1st Baron Halifax, an antiquarian who was to become a friend. In the next session of parliament, they reported on records in the Tower, and also in the Treasury Office of the Exchequer, at this period at the Cockpit-in-Court. So began a decade of 50 meetings of the Committee, in which Nicolson acted as antiquarian expert and link to George Holmes and others managing the records, while John Somers, 1st Baron Somers provided legal support. Nicolson put the future of the Cotton library onto the Committee's agenda.

To preserve records, Nicolson had special rooms built at Derry.

== "Every New Philosopher" ==
Nicholson was elected a Fellow of the Royal Society in November 1705. In conversation in January 1706, he asked John Vaughan, 3rd Earl of Carbery, another Fellow, for information on John Beaumont FRS, who had dedicated a book on spirits to Carbery. A "discourse" on current innovations in natural philosophy followed, in which Carbery observed that since Descartes, "Every New Philosopher thought himself wise enough to make a World". They referenced in particular Thomas Burnet and John Woodward.

From the 1690s Nicolson had both a practical and theoretical interest in geology, as a follower corresponding with Edward Lhuyd at the Ashmolean Museum. He wrote also to Martin Lister and John Morton, on explanations of Noah's Flood, with inconsistent answers. Woodward called on Nicolson in London in January 1703. Nicolson met the influential mining geologist John Hutchinson at Woodward's lodgings in December 1705.

Lhuyd and William Whiston became involved in a geological controversy with Woodward, regarded as a "great fray between the Virtuosi". The ramifying quarrel drew in John Harris, a cleric whom Nicolson met and liked after a Gresham College dinner held by Woodward in January 1705. He was defending Woodward vigorously against Tancred Robinson and John Ray. Nicolson felt he should intervene and mediate. In the end he couldn't see his way through "Dr. Burnet's roasted egg", "Dr. Woodward's hasty pudding", and "Mr. Whiston's snuff of a Comet".

== Family ==
In 1701, Nicolson married Elizabeth Archer, daughter of John Archer of Oxenholme, Westmoreland. They had eight children.

Church of England titles
Preceded by Thomas Smith	Bishop of Carlisle; 1702–1718	Succeeded by Samuel Bradford
Church of Ireland titles
Preceded by St George Ashe	Bishop of Derry; 1718–1727	Succeeded by Henry Downes
