= John Charles Cox =

John Charles Cox (1843 – 23 February 1919; published under the name J. Charles Cox) was an English cleric, activist and local historian.

== Life ==
He was born in Parwich, Derbyshire, the son of Edward Cox, vicar of Luccombe, Somerset, and was educated at Repton School. He studied at The Queen's College, Oxford, for two years from 1862, but left without graduating, becoming a partner in the Wingerworth Coal Company, Derbyshire. He remained with the company to 1885, but was ordained as an Anglican priest in 1881.

As rector of Barton-le-Street from 1886, and of Holdenby from 1893, Cox made a reputation as "perhaps one of the most influential English local historians of the nineteenth century", an area he had written on from the 1870s.

From 1890 until approximately 1895, Cox was editor of the monthly antiquarian magazine, The Antiquary. From 1900 he was in Sydenham, and concentrated on writing. One of his discoveries was Rotha Mary Clay who was a self-taught historian.

Cox was a political activist who "always focused on the need to fight for the socio-economic and political rights of the labouring poor".

He died on 23 February 1919.

== List of selected publications ==
- The Rise of the Farm Labourer: A Series of Articles ... Illustrative of Certain Political Aspects of the Agricultural Labour Movement (1874) with Henry Fisher Cox
- Notes on the Churches of Derbyshire, 4 vols., 1877–9
- How to Write the History of a Parish (1879; 5th ed., 1909)
- The Sports and Pastimes of the People of England (Joseph Strutt, 1801), editor, 1903
- The Royal Forests of England (1905)
- English Church Furniture (1908), with Alfred Harvey
- The Parish Registers of England (1910)
- The Sanctuaries and Sanctuary Seekers of Medieval England (1911)
- The English Parish Church (1914)
- Lincolnshire (1916)
- The Parish Churches of England; edited with additional chapters by Charles Bradley Ford. London: B. T. Batsford, 1935 (followed by later editions)

== Bibliography ==
- Abbot, Maurice (Spring 2000). "A short life of J. Charles Cox" (PDF). Derbyshire Miscellany. 15 (5): 127–133.
