= Ernest Albert Savage =

Scottish librarian (1877–1966)

- Born: 1877
- Died: 4 February 1966 (aged 88–89)
- Occupation: Librarian
- Known for: Library Science

Ernest Albert Savage (1877–1966) was Principal Librarian of Edinburgh Public Libraries from 1922 to 1942, President of the Scottish Library Association from 1929 to 1931, and President of the Library Association (now CILIP) in 1936. He wrote extensively on libraries and library science. Savage had a career-long concern with the training and professional status of librarians.

== Works ==
- The Bodleian Library. Ernest Albert Savage. (1902)
- Manual of Descriptive Annotation for Library Catalogs. Ernest Albert Baker and Ernest Albert Savage. (1906)
- The story of libraries and book collecting. Ernest Albert Savage. (1909)
- Old English Libraries; the Making, Collection, and Use of Books During the Middle Ages. Ernest Albert Savage. (1912)
- Notes on the early monastic libraries of Scotland; With an account of the Registrum librorum Angliæ and the Catalogus scriptorum ecclesiæ of John Boston of the abbey of Bury St. Edmunds. (1928)
- Savage, Ernest Albert (1930). Scottish public libraries under the new regime: Two papers read at the Annual Conference of the Scottish Library Association, Dumfries 21st May, 1930. Scottish Library Association. p. 23.
- The libraries of Bermuda, the Bahamas, the British West Indies, British Guiana, British Honduras, Puerto Rico, and the American Virgin Islands; A report to the Carnegie corporation of New York (1934)
- One way to form a music library. (1935)
- A Librarian Looks at Readers; Observation for Book Selection and Personal Service. Ernest Albert Savage. 2nd Ed. 266 pages. Library Association. (1950)
- A Librarian’s Memories. Ernest A. Savage, LL.D. Grafton & Co. 179 pages. (1952), memoir
