= Education in the Bahamas =

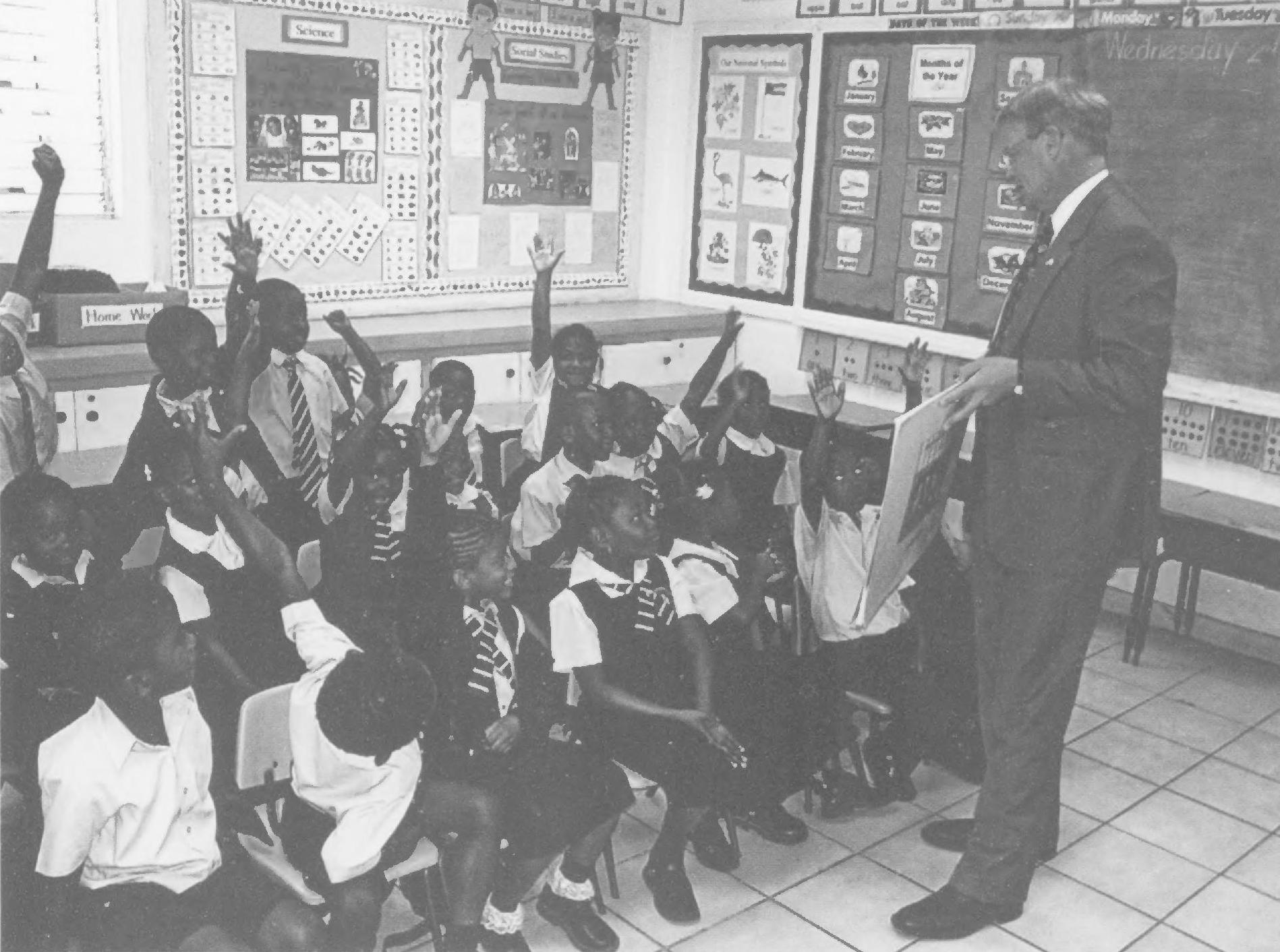
U.S. Ambassador John D. Rood reading to students at Woodcock Primary School in Nassau.

Education in the Bahamas is compulsory between the ages of 5 and 16. As of 2003, the school attendance rate was 92% and the literacy rate was 95.5%. The government fully operates a majority of primary and secondary schools in the Bahamas. The other schools are privately operated. Enrollment for state primary and secondary schools is 50,332, with more than 16,000 students attending private schools. Some public schools lack basic educational materials and are overcrowded. The Bahamas Union of Teachers (BUT) were the ones who acted to create some reform for their weakening education systems. The island has an Education Act that was revised in 1996 and is under control of the Prime Minister.

As of 1996, the Education Act states that education is free for children between the ages of 5 and 16. The University of the Bahamas, established in Nassau in 1974, provides programs leading to bachelors and associate degrees. Several non-Bahamian colleges also offer higher education programs in the Bahamas. Generally, the academic year in the Bahamas goes from late August or early September to late May or early June for primary and secondary schools and late April/early May for college.

== Structure of the education system ==
The Bahamas education includes primary education, secondary education, tertiary education, with a more recent addition of preschool institutions before those three stages. All education that is given to the students in the Bahamas along with their policies are made by the Ministry of Education, Sports and Culture.

In the Bahamas the Ministry of Education, Science and Technology is headed by the Minister of Education. His job is to oversee the 158 of the 210 primary and secondary schools in the Bahamas. The remaining schools are privately operated. Enrollment for state primary and secondary schools is 50,332, with more than 16,000 students attending private schools as of January 2019.

The Minister of Education strictly handles policies and guidelines that have to do with private and public schools. He is assisted by the Permanent Secretary Mrs. Donella Bodie and the Director of Education Mr. Marcellus Taylor who heads the Department of Education which is charged with basically the daily operations of all schools by ensuring that all protocols procedures and guidelines are followed.

Age	Education level	Grade	Examinations
18-20+	Tertiary Level	The University of the Bahamas; Success Training College; College of Saint Benedict / St. John's; Sojourner Douglas College; Nova Southeastern University; Bahamas Baptist College; University of Miami; Bahamas Institute of Technology	Degrees: A.A., B.A., B.Ed. & B.Sc. certificates and diplomas
15-17	Upper Secondary	12, 11, 10	BGCSE, RSA, Pitmans
12-14	Lower Secondary	9, 8, 7	BJC
5-11	Primary	6, 5, 4, 3, 2, 1	Glat Grades 3, 6 Writing Assessment
1-4	Pre-School		No Formal Examinations

As of today, it is required that all children from the ages 5 to 16 years old are to be signed up for some sort of educational facility. Despite private education, public education is free to all people who wish to enroll. There are no racial, gender, or economic background limitations when it comes to who receives education as well. In 2007, about 66,000 students were in enrolled in some kind of institution that is public. Over half of that number are already in their primary education stage.

== Early childhood/preschool education ==
Centers for children who fell in the early childhood category didn't have access to the education they do now. The government of the Bahamas assisted in implementing preschool centers for children under the age of 5. They also took action to make daycare centers and private preschools for the significant number of children who were in need of it. The importance of the expansion of preschools was based on the fact that children needed to be more equipped when entering first grade. Most of them don't have the fundamental skills but some of them do that would allow them to comprehend what is going on in that next level.

In order to guarantee success in the preschools, it was necessary for the government to establish the Preschool and Daycare Centre Council. They oversee all systems and functions that take place in the daycares and private preschools across the country. 64 preschools that are stand alone or a preschool unit, an addition to a primary school, reside all across the Bahamas today.

Every couple of years the Council re-evaluates the curriculum of these preschools to stay updated with the changing world around them. Their curriculum is the standard reading, writing, and numeracy, but the Council continues to strive to bring technology in the mix. Technology makes up most of the workforce that they will eventually enter into, so it is crucial for them to be ready for when they use it in their primary and secondary schools.

== Primary education ==
With the number of children living in urban areas of the Bahamas rising, it was about time for primary schools to make an appearance. Primary Education begins at age 5 and lasts for six years. Most students speak English by this point in their studies, but there are occasions where a child is still coming to understand English as their second language. The primary schools heavily reinforce English as their second language so from that point on, there is a commonality among all the students. As a result, primary school teachers are taught the mechanisms used to teach the students English in addition to their regular everyday studies. Those include: math, science, language arts, reading, etc.

At this stage, educators are guiding the students to become problem-solvers and make connections from the curriculum to real life.

== Secondary education ==
Secondary education is a total of six years, but is divided into two equal parts of the time they spend there. The first half, considered junior high, accommodates students from ages twelve to fourteen. The second half of those three years, considered senior high, accommodates ages fifteen to seventeen. The reason for this split is merely because the schools don't want any bullying taking place on the younger students and, in turn, affecting their focus on their schoolwork.

The secondary education curriculum was designed to expose the students to cultural subjects as well as vocational and technical subjects. The hope is the students will be presented opportunities that integrate them socially and culturally to fully comprehend life out of the institution.

By the end of grade nine, students are administered a Bahamas Junior Certificate examination that they must pass this exam in order to move onto their next level. The Bahamas General Certificate of Secondary Education is given to students as an exit exam at the end of grade 12. It is expected that students make it all the way to grade 12 once they enrol in the first grade. Most students complete secondary school with no problem, but it is up to them if they wish to pursue a post-secondary school institution.

== Tertiary education/University of the Bahamas ==
There are a number of colleges across the country that are open to students looking to further their post-secondary education. As expected, there is an application process that students must complete before being accepted.

In 1974, one of the larger colleges within the Bahamas opened its doors with offerings of associate degrees, certificates, and diplomas. The College of the Bahamas was an equivalent of a state school in terms of how prestigious it was. As time went on, the Bahamas realized that in order for them to keep up with the competitive edge of universities, they would have to expand their programs. Various bachelor's degrees were added in fields of Nursing, Business, and Education around the early 1990s which accelerated their program developments.

The College Council continued to grow their institution by adding various buildings to provide educational environments for the different career fields. All of the expanding they were doing was what set off the idea of creating an upgraded College of the Bahamas: University of the Bahamas. A committee was created to handle all of the planning that would go into the future University and by August 2006 a plan was finalized. The transition was one that took time, but by August 2016 the President of the university's academic committee, Jerome Fitzgerald, announced that the College of the Bahamas was officially the University of the Bahamas.

The university expresses that its mission is to promote a higher education for their students that will benefit them in all aspects of their careers. University of the Bahamas strives to build the commonwealth of their country, so it is more than worth it to them to have built something as large-scale as the new institution.

The Open Campus of the University of the West Indies has a site in the Bahamas. In addition, established in 1978, the Bahamas-based Centre for Hotel and Tourism Management is a component of the UWI Mona Faculty of Social Sciences. Students may earn undergraduate degrees in hotel management and in tourism management. A master's degree in hospitality management is available in collaboration with the Florida International University. It also has campuses in Barbados, Trinidad, and Jamaica. The government of the Bahamas contributes financially to the UWI.

== Total number of schools ==
School Type	New Providence	Family Islands	Total
Preschool	4	5	9
Primary	25	69	94
All-age	0	13	13
Junior High	7	1	8
Senior High	8	0	8
Secondary	1	23	24
Special	8	5	13
Post-secondary/Tertiary	2	0	2
Total	55	116	171

== Education and prison reform ==
To increase rehabilitation rates in the Bahamas, there was an education program introduced to help the imprisoned become better prepared for release and integration into society. The World Declaration on Education for All organization works to reduce illiteracy among adults and has been an active advocator for bettering the education system in prisons in the Caribbean. The goal of the World Declaration on Education for All was to educate all people through growth and development of any and all education programs in place at different correctional facilities. The organization focused on the skills inmates had and worked to further develop them and introduce new skills that would be necessary to education and release.

They worked with other countries and organizations to educate many people across the world. It was in the 1990s, the Minister of Education of the Bahamas reviewed the EFA guidelines and initiated a 5-year program to better the education system in the prisons in the Bahamas. There were 6 formal programs directly linked to education and 3 informal programs indirectly linked to providing a better education to inmates.

Providing inmates with education, enables them to find job opportunities and increases the chances of successfully becoming a part of society. Reintegration is an important part of being released from prison. It is when officers try to aid inmates with necessary information and tools to successfully rejoin society and return to the life you may have had before imprisoned. The program focused on individuals between the ages of 16 and 24.

== Special institutions ==
The Bahama's education system does all it can to make sure that all of their students receive some form of access to education whenever possible. They have a Special Services Division who recognizes the needs of the disabled students and creates an environment where they can thrive in. Special Education schools, located on New Providence and Grand Bahamas, provide this type of environment as they are strictly for children with mental and physical limitations.

On the other hand, not all handicapped students are recommended to go to these schools. Students who are autistic or even hearing impaired are encouraged to attend the public schools because educators want a blended environment with no child being left out. Additionally, the students will receive realistic scenarios because they weren't sheltered from other people. Teachers are well-equipped with various counseling, guidance, and psychology tools to refine the learning material in the classrooms.

== Technology disadvantage ==
The Bahamas have come a long way since the 1950s with their education systems. Although students were still able to learn, they had difficulty thriving in the classroom due to the lack of updated materials provided by the schools. They used what resembles a white board to take all their notes on instead of a journal or workbook for each of their classes. This system proved to not be efficient because students were struggling when it came time to learning handfuls of material without proper storage for their notes.

One educator at a technical college in the Bahamas discusses how although the teachers have access to technology such as smart boards or computers, the students do not. Education is becoming more technology-based and younger teachers that are coming into the education workforce are equipped to teach with such technology, but with students having a lack of knowledge about the advances, the teachers can't do this.

Another instructor at a local college argues that the government will see a positive outcome if their students were able to take advantage of online learning. Most students spend a majority of their time online outside of class, so it is likely that they would be more inclined to participate in class projects. The future is projected to be very dependent on technology and the students will gather the tools they need once they are more exposed to how it works.

There have been attempts to try to fix this issue with the education system, but there have been many bumps in the road. Institutions have come across a lack of funding when:

- attempting to provide sufficient and/or updated software and hardware resources to teachers and students.
- trying to teach the instructors the process of actually demonstrating to the students how to use the online programs.

In addition, teachers weren't expecting all the overtime hours they would have to put in when learning the online programs in addition to teaching their regular classroom hours. Many of them opted out of learning the programs which leaves a huge disconnect if all the teachers aren't interested in participating.

Institutions were generally not sympathetic in recognizing that the creation of online materials is time-consuming and provided no workload accommodation to teachers or hired curriculum developers to produce or curate online materials. Updated curriculum guides are not even offered in all subjects, as can be seen here. The links offered as syllabuses are presented in outdated document formats.

Most recently, the Bahamas government has discussed the importance of technology, especially when students enter the workforce. For example, if a student enters the medical field, it is possible they will need to be educated on how to use certain equipment or technology that their job may require. The government recognizes this concern, but has yet to make any big moves about requiring technology in the classrooms. Some families have computers in their homes while others can't afford the luxury. The goal of the future Bahamas is to make technology accessible to all through whatever means it takes to get them there.
