= Programme for International Student Assessment (2000 to 2012) =

Educational assessment and evaluation

The Programme for International Student Assessment has had several runs before the most recent one in 2012. The first PISA assessment was carried out in 2000. The results of each period of assessment take about one year and a half to be analysed. First results were published in November 2001. The release of raw data and the publication of technical report and data handbook only took place in spring 2002. The triennial repeats follow a similar schedule; the process of seeing through a single PISA cycle, start-to-finish, always takes over four years. 470,000 15-year-old students representing 65 nations and territories participated in PISA 2009. An additional 50,000 students representing nine nations were tested in 2010.

Every period of assessment focuses on one of the three competence fields of reading, math, science; but the two others are tested as well. After nine years, a full cycle is completed: after 2000, reading was again the main domain in 2009.

Period	Focus	OECD countries	Partner countries	Participating students	Notes
2000	Reading	28	4 + 11	265,000	The Netherlands disqualified from data analysis. 11 additional non-OECD countries took the test in 2002.
2003	Mathematics	30	11	275,000	UK disqualified from data analysis. Also included test in problem solving.
2006	Science	30	27	400,000	Reading scores for US excluded from analysis due to misprint in testing materials.
2009	Reading	34	41 + 10	470,000	10 additional non-OECD countries took the test in 2010.
2012	Mathematics	34	31	510,000	

== Results ==
=== PISA 2012 ===
PISA 2012

The results for the 2012 "Maths" section on a world map.

The results for the 2012 "Science" section on a world map.

The results for the 2012 "Reading" section on a world map.

OECD members as of the time of the study are in **boldface**.
Mathematics

1	Shanghai, China	613
2	Singapore	573
3	Hong Kong, China	561
4	Taiwan	560
5	**South Korea**	554
6	Macau, China	538
7	**Japan**	536
8	Liechtenstein	535
9	**Switzerland**	531
10	**Netherlands**	523
11	**Estonia**	521
12	**Finland**	519
13=	**Canada**	518
13=	**Poland**	518
15	**Belgium**	515
16	**Germany**	514
17	Vietnam	511
18	**Austria**	506
19	**Australia**	504
20=	**Ireland**	501
20=	**Slovenia**	501
22=	**Denmark**	500
22=	**New Zealand**	500
24	**Czech Republic**	499
25	**France**	495
26	**United Kingdom**	494
27	**Iceland**	493
28	Latvia	491
29	**Luxembourg**	490
30	**Norway**	489
31	**Portugal**	487
32	**Italy**	485
33	**Spain**	484
34=	Russia	482
34=	**Slovakia**	482
36	**United States**	481
37	Lithuania	479
38	**Sweden**	478
39	**Hungary**	477
40	Croatia	471
41	**Israel**	466
42	**Greece**	453
43	Serbia	449
44	**Turkey**	448
45	Romania	445
46	Cyprus	440
47	Bulgaria	439
48	United Arab Emirates	434
49	Kazakhstan	432
50	Thailand	427
51	**Chile**	423
52	Malaysia	421
53	**Mexico**	413
54	Montenegro	410
55	Uruguay	409
56	Costa Rica	407
57	Albania	394
58	Brazil	391
59=	Argentina	388
59=	Tunisia	388
61	Jordan	386
62=	Colombia	376
62=	Qatar	376
64	Indonesia	375
65	Peru	368

Science

1	Shanghai, China	580
2	Hong Kong, China	555
3	Singapore	551
4	**Japan**	547
5	**Finland**	545
6	**Estonia**	541
7	**South Korea**	538
8	Vietnam	528
9	**Poland**	526
10=	Liechtenstein	525
10=	**Canada**	525
12	**Germany**	524
13	Taiwan	523
14=	**Netherlands**	522
14=	**Ireland**	522
16=	Macau, China	521
16=	**Australia**	521
18	**New Zealand**	516
19	**Switzerland**	515
20=	**Slovenia**	514
20=	**United Kingdom**	514
22	**Czech Republic**	508
23	**Austria**	506
24	**Belgium**	505
25	Latvia	502
26	**France**	499
27	**Denmark**	498
28	**United States**	497
29=	**Spain**	496
29=	Lithuania	496
31	**Norway**	495
32=	**Italy**	494
32=	**Hungary**	494
34=	**Luxembourg**	491
34=	Croatia	491
36	**Portugal**	489
37	Russia	486
38	**Sweden**	485
39	**Iceland**	478
40	**Slovakia**	471
41	**Israel**	470
42	**Greece**	467
43	**Turkey**	463
44	United Arab Emirates	448
45	Bulgaria	446
46=	Serbia	445
46=	**Chile**	445
48	Thailand	444
49	Romania	439
50	Cyprus	438
51	Costa Rica	429
52	Kazakhstan	425
53	Malaysia	420
54	Uruguay	416
55	**Mexico**	415
56	Montenegro	410
57	Jordan	409
58	Argentina	406
59	Brazil	405
60	Colombia	399
61	Tunisia	398
62	Albania	397
63	Qatar	384
64	Indonesia	382
65	Peru	373

Reading

1	Shanghai, China	570
2	Hong Kong, China	545
3	Singapore	542
4	**Japan**	538
5	**South Korea**	536
6	**Finland**	524
7=	Taiwan	523
7=	**Canada**	523
7=	**Ireland**	523
10	**Poland**	518
11=	Liechtenstein	516
11=	**Estonia**	516
13=	**Australia**	512
13=	**New Zealand**	512
15	**Netherlands**	511
16=	Macau, China	509
16=	**Switzerland**	509
16=	**Belgium**	509
19=	**Germany**	508
19=	Vietnam	508
21	**France**	505
22	**Norway**	504
23	**United Kingdom**	499
24	**United States**	498
25	**Denmark**	496
26	**Czech Republic**	493
27=	**Austria**	490
27=	**Italy**	490
29	Latvia	489
30=	**Luxembourg**	488
30=	**Portugal**	488
30=	**Spain**	488
30=	**Hungary**	488
34	**Israel**	486
35	Croatia	485
36=	**Iceland**	483
36=	**Sweden**	483
38	**Slovenia**	481
39=	Lithuania	477
39=	**Greece**	477
41=	Russia	475
41=	**Turkey**	475
43	**Slovakia**	463
44	Cyprus	449
45	Serbia	446
46	United Arab Emirates	442
47=	Thailand	441
47=	**Chile**	441
47=	Costa Rica	441
50	Romania	438
51	Bulgaria	436
52	**Mexico**	424
53	Montenegro	422
54	Uruguay	411
55	Brazil	410
56	Tunisia	404
57	Colombia	403
58	Jordan	399
59	Malaysia	398
60=	Argentina	396
60=	Indonesia	396
62	Albania	394
63	Kazakhstan	393
64	Qatar	388
65	Peru	384

PISA 2012 was presented on 3 December 2013, with results for around 510,000 participating students in all 34 OECD member countries and 31 partner countries. This testing cycle had a particular focus on mathematics, where the mean score was 494. A sample of 1,688 students from Puerto Rico took the assessment, scoring 379 in math, 404 in reading and 401 in science. A subgroup of 44 countries and economies with about 85 000 students also took part in an optional computer-based assessment of problem solving.

Shanghai had the highest score in all three subjects. It was followed by Singapore, Hong Kong, Chinese Taipei and Korea in mathematics; Hong Kong, Singapore, Japan and Korea in reading and Hong Kong, Singapore, Japan and Finland in science.

They were a sample of about 28 million in the same age group in 65 countries and economies, including the OECD countries, several Chinese cities, Vietnam, Indonesia and several countries in South America.

The test lasted two hours, was paper-based and included both open-ended and multiple-choice questions.

The students and school staff also answered a questionnaire to provide background information about the students and the schools.

PISA 2012 was presented on 3 December 2013, with results for around 510,000 participating students in all 34 OECD member countries and 31 partner countries. This testing cycle had a particular focus on mathematics, where the mean score was 494. The mean score in reading was 496 and in science 501.

The results show distinct groups of high-performers in mathematics: the East Asian countries, with Shanghai, scoring the best result of 613, followed closely by Hong Kong, Japan, Chinese Taipei and South Korea. Among the Europeans, Liechtenstein and Switzerland performed best, with Netherlands, Estonia, Finland, Poland, Belgium, Germany, Austria all posting mathematics scores "not significantly statistically different from" one another. The United Kingdom, Ireland, Australia and New Zealand were similarly clustered around the OECD average of 494, with the USA trailing this group at 481.

Qatar, Kazakhstan and Malaysia were the countries which showed the greatest improvement in mathematics. The USA and the United Kingdom showed no significant change. Sweden had the greatest fall in mathematics performance over the last ten years, with a similar falling trend also in the two other subjects, and leading politicians in Sweden expressed great worry over the results.

On average boys scored better than girls in mathematics, girls scored better than boys in reading and the two sexes had quite similar scores in science.

Indonesia, Albania, Peru, Thailand and Colombia were the countries where most students reported being happy at school, while students in Korea, the Czech Republic, the Slovak Republic, Estonia and Finland reported least happiness.

=== PISA 2009 ===
PISA 2009

The PISA 2009 cycle included results in mathematics, science and reading for all 36 OECD member countries and 37 partner countries.

Of the partner countries, only selected areas of three countries—India, Venezuela and China—were assessed. PISA 2009+, released in December 2011, included data from 10 additional partner countries which had testing delayed from 2009 to 2010 because of scheduling constraints.

OECD members as of the time of the study are in **boldface**.Participants in PISA 2009+, which were tested in 2010 after the main group of 65, are italicized.
Mathematics

1	Shanghai, China	600
2	Singapore	562
3	Hong Kong, China	555
4	**South Korea**	546
5	Taiwan	543
6	**Finland**	541
7	Liechtenstein	536
8	**Switzerland**	534
9	**Japan**	529
10	**Canada**	527
11	**Netherlands**	526
12	Macau, China	525
13	**New Zealand**	519
14	**Belgium**	515
15	**Australia**	514
16	**Germany**	513
17	**Estonia**	512
18	**Iceland**	507
19	**Denmark**	503
20	**Slovenia**	501
21	**Norway**	498
22	**France**	497
23	**Slovakia**	497
24	**Austria**	496
25	**Poland**	495
26	**Sweden**	494
27	**Czech Republic**	493
28	**United Kingdom**	492
29	**Hungary**	490
30	**Luxembourg**	489
31	**United States**	487
32	**Portugal**	487
33	**Ireland**	487
34	**Spain**	483
35	**Italy**	483
36	Latvia	482
37	Lithuania	477
38	Russia	468
39	**Greece**	466
40	Malta	463
41	Croatia	460
42	**Israel**	447
43	**Turkey**	445
44	Serbia	442
45	Azerbaijan	431
46	Bulgaria	428
47	Uruguay	427
48	Romania	427
49	United Arab Emirates	421
50	**Chile**	421
51	Mauritius	420
52	Thailand	419
53	**Mexico**	419
54	Trinidad and Tobago	414
55	Costa Rica	409
56	Kazakhstan	405
57	Malaysia	404
58	Montenegro	403
59	Moldova	397
60	Miranda, Venezuela	397
61	Argentina	388
62	Jordan	387
63	Brazil	386
64	Colombia	381
65	Georgia	379
66	Albania	377
67	Tunisia	371
68	Indonesia	371
69	Qatar	368
70	Peru	365
71	Panama	360
72	Tamil Nadu, India	351
73	Himachal Pradesh, India	338
74	Kyrgyzstan	331

Science

1	Shanghai, China	575
2	**Finland**	554
3	Hong Kong, China	549
4	Singapore	542
5	**Japan**	539
6	**South Korea**	538
7	**New Zealand**	532
8	**Canada**	529
9	**Estonia**	528
10	**Australia**	527
11	**Netherlands**	522
12	Liechtenstein	520
13	**Germany**	520
14	Taiwan	520
15	**Switzerland**	517
16	**United Kingdom**	514
17	**Slovenia**	512
18	Macau, China	511
19	**Poland**	508
20	**Ireland**	508
21	**Belgium**	507
22	**Hungary**	503
23	**United States**	502
24	**Norway**	500
25	**Czech Republic**	500
26	**Denmark**	499
27	**France**	498
28	**Iceland**	496
29	**Sweden**	495
30	Latvia	494
31	**Austria**	494
32	**Portugal**	493
33	Lithuania	491
34	Slovakia	490
35	**Italy**	489
36	**Spain**	488
37	Croatia	486
38	**Luxembourg**	484
39	Russia	478
40	**Greece**	470
41	Malta	461
42	**Israel**	455
43	**Turkey**	454
44	**Chile**	447
45	Serbia	443
46	Bulgaria	439
47	United Arab Emirates	438
48	Costa Rica	430
49	Romania	428
50	Uruguay	427
51	Thailand	425
52	Miranda, Venezuela	422
53	Malaysia	422
54	Mauritius	417
55	**Mexico**	416
56	Jordan	415
57	Moldova	413
58	Trinidad and Tobago	410
59	Brazil	405
60	Colombia	402
61	Tunisia	401
62	Montenegro	401
63	Argentina	401
64	Kazakhstan	400
65	Albania	391
66	Indonesia	383
67	Qatar	379
68	Panama	376
69	Georgia	373
70	Azerbaijan	373
71	Peru	369
72	Tamil Nadu, India	348
73	Kyrgyzstan	330
74	Himachal Pradesh, India	325

Reading

1	Shanghai, China	556
2	**South Korea**	539
3	**Finland**	536
4	Hong Kong, China	533
5	Singapore	526
6	**Canada**	524
7	**New Zealand**	521
8	**Japan**	520
9	**Australia**	515
10	**Netherlands**	508
11	**Belgium**	506
12	**Norway**	503
13	**Estonia**	501
14	**Switzerland**	501
15	**Poland**	500
16	**Iceland**	500
17	**United States**	500
18	Liechtenstein	499
19	**Sweden**	497
20	**Germany**	497
21	**Ireland**	496
22	**France**	496
23	Taiwan	495
24	**Denmark**	495
25	**United Kingdom**	494
26	**Hungary**	494
27	**Portugal**	489
28	Macau, China	487
29	**Italy**	486
30	Latvia	484
31	**Greece**	483
32	**Slovenia**	483
33	**Spain**	481
34	**Czech Republic**	478
35	Slovakia	477
36	Croatia	476
37	**Israel**	474
38	**Luxembourg**	472
39	**Austria**	470
40	Lithuania	468
41	**Turkey**	464
42	Russia	459
43	**Chile**	449
44	Costa Rica	443
45	Malta	442
46	Serbia	442
47	United Arab Emirates	431
48	Bulgaria	429
49	Uruguay	426
50	**Mexico**	425
51	Romania	424
52	Miranda, Venezuela	422
53	Thailand	421
54	Trinidad and Tobago	416
55	Malaysia	414
56	Colombia	413
57	Brazil	412
58	Montenegro	408
59	Mauritius	407
60	Jordan	405
61	Tunisia	404
62	Indonesia	402
63	Argentina	398
64	Kazakhstan	390
65	Moldova	388
66	Albania	385
67	Georgia	374
68	Qatar	372
69	Panama	371
70	Peru	370
71	Azerbaijan	362
72	Tamil Nadu, India	337
73	Himachal Pradesh, India	317
74	Kyrgyzstan	314

=== PISA 2006 ===
PISA 2006

OECD members as of the time of the study are in **boldface**.Reading scores for the United States were disqualified.
Mathematics

1	Taiwan	549
2	**Finland**	548
3	**South Korea**	547
4	Hong Kong, China	547
5	**Netherlands**	531
6	**Switzerland**	530
7	**Canada**	527
8	Macau, China	525
9	Liechtenstein	525
10	**Japan**	523
11	**New Zealand**	522
12	**Belgium**	520
13	**Australia**	520
14	**Estonia**	515
15	**Denmark**	513
16	**Czech Republic**	510
17	**Iceland**	506
18	**Austria**	505
19	**Slovenia**	504
20	**Germany**	504
21	**Sweden**	502
22	**Ireland**	501
23	**France**	496
24	**United Kingdom**	495
25	**Poland**	495
26	**Slovakia**	492
27	**Hungary**	491
28	**Norway**	490
29	**Luxembourg**	490
30	Lithuania	486
31	Latvia	486
32	**Spain**	480
33	Russia	476
34	Azerbaijan	476
35	**United States**	474
36	Croatia	467
37	**Portugal**	466
38	**Italy**	462
39	**Greece**	459
40	**Israel**	442
41	Serbia	435
42	Uruguay	427
43	**Turkey**	424
44	Thailand	417
45	Romania	415
46	Bulgaria	413
47	**Chile**	411
48	**Mexico**	406
49	Montenegro	399
50	Indonesia	391
51	Jordan	384
52	Argentina	381
53	Colombia	370
54	Brazil	370
55	Tunisia	365
56	Qatar	318
57	Kyrgyzstan	311

Science

1	**Finland**	563
2	Hong Kong, China	542
3	**Canada**	534
4	Taiwan	532
5	**Japan**	531
6	**Estonia**	531
7	**New Zealand**	530
8	**Australia**	527
9	**Netherlands**	525
10	Liechtenstein	522
11	**South Korea**	522
12	**Slovenia**	519
13	**Germany**	516
14	**United Kingdom**	515
15	**Czech Republic**	513
16	**Switzerland**	512
17	**Austria**	511
18	Macau, China	511
19	**Belgium**	510
20	**Ireland**	508
21	**Hungary**	504
22	**Sweden**	503
23	**Poland**	498
24	**Denmark**	496
25	**France**	495
26	Croatia	493
27	**Iceland**	491
28	Latvia	490
29	**United States**	489
30	**Slovakia**	488
31	**Spain**	488
32	Lithuania	488
33	**Norway**	487
34	**Luxembourg**	486
35	Russia	479
36	**Italy**	475
37	**Portugal**	474
38	**Greece**	473
39	**Israel**	454
40	**Chile**	438
41	Serbia	436
42	Bulgaria	434
43	Uruguay	428
44	**Turkey**	424
45	Jordan	422
46	Thailand	421
47	Romania	418
48	Montenegro	412
49	**Mexico**	410
50	Indonesia	393
51	Argentina	391
52	Brazil	390
53	Colombia	388
54	Tunisia	386
55	Azerbaijan	382
56	Qatar	349
57	Kyrgyzstan	322

Reading

1	**South Korea**	556
2	**Finland**	547
3	Hong Kong, China	536
4	**Canada**	527
5	**New Zealand**	521
6	**Ireland**	517
7	**Australia**	513
8	Liechtenstein	510
9	**Poland**	508
10	**Sweden**	507
11	**Netherlands**	507
12	**Belgium**	501
13	**Estonia**	501
14	**Switzerland**	499
15	**Japan**	498
16	Taiwan	496
17	**United Kingdom**	495
18	**Germany**	495
19	**Denmark**	494
20	**Slovenia**	494
21	Macau, China	492
22	**Austria**	490
23	**France**	488
24	**Iceland**	484
25	**Norway**	484
26	**Czech Republic**	483
27	**Hungary**	482
28	Latvia	479
29	**Luxembourg**	479
30	Croatia	477
31	**Portugal**	472
32	Lithuania	470
33	**Italy**	469
34	**Slovakia**	466
35	**Spain**	461
36	**Greece**	460
37	**Turkey**	447
38	**Chile**	442
39	Russia	440
40	**Israel**	439
41	Thailand	417
42	Uruguay	413
43	**Mexico**	410
44	Bulgaria	402
45	Serbia	401
46	Jordan	401
47	Romania	396
48	Indonesia	393
49	Brazil	393
50	Montenegro	392
51	Colombia	385
52	Tunisia	380
53	Argentina	374
54	Azerbaijan	353
55	Qatar	312
56	Kyrgyzstan	285

=== PISA 2003 ===
The results for PISA 2003 were released on 14 December 2004. This PISA cycle tested 275,000 15 year-olds on mathematics, science, reading and problem solving and involved schools from 30 OECD member countries and 11 partner countries. Note that for Science and Reading, the means displayed are for "All Students", but for these two subjects (domains), not all of the students answered questions in these domains. In the 2003 OECD Technical Report (pages 208, 209), there are different country means (different than those displayed below) available for students who had exposure to these domains.

PISA 2003

OECD members at the time of the study are in **boldface**.The United Kingdom was disqualified due to a low response rate.
Mathematics

1	Hong Kong, China	550
2	**Finland**	544
3	**Korea**	542
4	**Netherlands**	538
5	Liechtenstein	536
6	**Japan**	534
7	**Canada**	532
8	**Belgium**	529
9	Macau, China	527
10	**Switzerland**	527
11	**Australia**	524
12	**New Zealand**	523
13	**Czech Republic**	516
14	**Iceland**	515
15	**Denmark**	514
16	**France**	511
17	**Sweden**	509
18	**Austria**	506
19	**Germany**	503
20	**Ireland**	503
21	**Slovakia**	498
22	**Norway**	495
23	**Luxembourg**	493
24	**Poland**	490
25	**Hungary**	490
26	**Spain**	485
27	Latvia	483
28	**United States**	483
29	Russia	468
30	**Portugal**	466
31	**Italy**	466
32	**Greece**	445
33	Serbia and Montenegro	437
34	**Turkey**	423
35	Uruguay	422
36	Thailand	417
37	**Mexico**	385
38	Indonesia	360
39	Tunisia	359
40	Brazil	356

Science

1	**Finland**	548
2	**Japan**	548
3	Hong Kong, China	539
4	**Korea**	538
5	Liechtenstein	525
6	**Australia**	525
7	Macau, China	525
8	**Netherlands**	524
9	**Czech Republic**	523
10	**New Zealand**	521
11	**Canada**	519
12	**Switzerland**	513
13	**France**	511
14	**Belgium**	509
15	**Sweden**	506
16	**Ireland**	505
17	**Hungary**	503
18	**Germany**	502
19	**Poland**	498
20	**Slovakia**	495
21	**Iceland**	495
22	**United States**	491
23	**Austria**	491
24	Russia	489
25	Latvia	489
26	**Spain**	487
27	**Italy**	486
28	**Norway**	484
29	**Luxembourg**	483
30	**Greece**	481
31	**Denmark**	475
32	**Portugal**	468
33	Uruguay	438
34	Serbia and Montenegro	436
35	**Turkey**	434
36	Thailand	429
37	**Mexico**	405
38	Indonesia	395
39	Brazil	390
40	Tunisia	385

Reading

1	**Finland**	543
2	**Korea**	534
3	**Canada**	528
4	**Australia**	525
5	Liechtenstein	525
6	**New Zealand**	522
7	**Ireland**	515
8	**Sweden**	514
9	**Netherlands**	513
10	Hong Kong, China	510
11	**Belgium**	507
12	**Norway**	500
13	**Switzerland**	499
14	**Japan**	498
15	Macau, China	498
16	**Poland**	497
17	**France**	496
18	**United States**	495
19	**Denmark**	492
20	**Iceland**	492
21	**Germany**	491
22	**Austria**	491
23	Latvia	491
24	**Czech Republic**	489
25	**Hungary**	482
26	**Spain**	481
27	**Luxembourg**	479
28	**Portugal**	478
29	**Italy**	476
30	**Greece**	472
31	**Slovakia**	469
32	Russia	442
33	**Turkey**	441
34	Uruguay	434
35	Thailand	420
36	Serbia and Montenegro	412
37	Brazil	403
38	**Mexico**	400
39	Indonesia	382
40	Tunisia	375

Problem solving

1	**Korea**	550
2	Hong Kong, China	548
3	**Finland**	548
4	**Japan**	547
5	**New Zealand**	533
6	Macau, China	532
7	**Australia**	530
8	Liechtenstein	529
9	**Canada**	529
10	**Belgium**	525
11	**Switzerland**	521
12	**Netherlands**	520
13	**France**	519
14	**Denmark**	517
15	**Czech Republic**	516
16	**Germany**	513
17	**Sweden**	509
18	**Austria**	506
19	**Iceland**	505
20	**Hungary**	501
21	**Ireland**	498
22	**Luxembourg**	494
23	**Slovakia**	492
24	**Norway**	490
25	**Poland**	487
26	Latvia	483
27	**Spain**	482
28	Russia	479
29	**United States**	477
30	**Portugal**	470
31	**Italy**	469
32	**Greece**	448
33	Thailand	425
34	Serbia and Montenegro	420
35	Uruguay	411
36	**Turkey**	408
37	**Mexico**	384
38	Brazil	371
39	Indonesia	361
40	Tunisia	345

=== PISA 2000 ===
The results for the first cycle of the PISA survey were released on 14 November 2001. 265,000 15 year-olds were tested in 28 OECD countries and 4 partner countries on mathematics, science and reading. An additional 11 countries were tested later in 2002.

PISA 2000

OECD members as of the time of the study are in **boldface**.The 11 partner countries tested in 2002 after the main group of 32 are italicized.
Mathematics

1	Hong Kong, China	560
2	**Japan**	557
3	**Korea**	547
4	**New Zealand**	537
5	**Finland**	536
6	**Australia**	533
7	**Canada**	533
8	**Switzerland**	529
9	**United Kingdom**	529
10	**Belgium**	520
11	**France**	517
12	**Austria**	515
13	**Denmark**	514
14	**Iceland**	514
15	Liechtenstein	514
16	**Sweden**	510
17	**Ireland**	503
18	**Norway**	499
19	**Czech Republic**	498
20	**United States**	493
21	**Germany**	490
22	**Hungary**	488
23	Russia	478
24	**Spain**	476
25	**Poland**	470
26	Latvia	463
27	**Italy**	457
28	**Portugal**	454
29	**Greece**	447
30	**Luxembourg**	446
31	Israel	433
32	Thailand	432
33	Bulgaria	430
34	Argentina	388
35	**Mexico**	387
36	Chile	384
37	Albania	381
38	Macedonia	381
39	Indonesia	367
40	Brazil	334
41	Peru	292

Science

1	**Korea**	552
2	**Japan**	550
3	Hong Kong, China	541
4	**Finland**	538
5	**United Kingdom**	532
6	**Canada**	529
7	**New Zealand**	528
8	**Australia**	528
9	**Austria**	519
10	**Ireland**	513
11	**Sweden**	512
12	**Czech Republic**	511
13	**France**	500
14	**Norway**	500
15	**United States**	499
16	**Hungary**	496
17	**Iceland**	496
18	**Belgium**	496
19	**Switzerland**	496
20	**Spain**	491
21	**Germany**	487
22	**Poland**	483
23	**Denmark**	481
24	**Italy**	478
25	Liechtenstein	476
26	**Greece**	461
27	Russia	460
28	Latvia	460
29	**Portugal**	459
30	Bulgaria	448
31	**Luxembourg**	443
32	Thailand	436
33	Israel	434
34	**Mexico**	422
35	Chile	415
36	Macedonia	401
37	Argentina	396
38	Indonesia	393
39	Albania	376
40	Brazil	375
41	Peru	333

Reading

1	**Finland**	546
2	**Canada**	534
3	**New Zealand**	529
4	**Australia**	528
5	**Ireland**	527
6	Hong Kong, China	525
7	**Korea**	525
8	**United Kingdom**	523
9	**Japan**	522
10	**Sweden**	516
11	**Austria**	507
12	**Belgium**	507
13	**Iceland**	507
14	**Norway**	505
15	**France**	505
16	**United States**	504
17	**Denmark**	497
18	**Switzerland**	494
19	**Spain**	493
20	**Czech Republic**	492
21	**Italy**	487
22	**Germany**	484
23	Liechtenstein	483
24	**Hungary**	480
25	**Poland**	479
26	**Greece**	474
27	**Portugal**	470
28	Russia	462
29	Latvia	458
30	Israel	452
31	**Luxembourg**	441
32	Thailand	431
33	Bulgaria	430
34	**Mexico**	422
35	Argentina	418
36	Chile	410
37	Brazil	396
38	Macedonia	373
39	Indonesia	371
40	Albania	349
41	Peru	327

== Comparison with other studies ==
The correlation between PISA 2003 and TIMSS 2003 grade 8 country means is 0.84 in mathematics, 0.95 in science. The values go down to 0.66 and 0.79 if the two worst performing developing countries are excluded. Correlations between different scales and studies are around 0.80. The high correlations between different scales and studies indicate common causes of country differences (e.g. educational quality, culture, wealth or genes) or a homogenous underlying factor of cognitive competence. European Economic Area countries perform slightly better in PISA; the Commonwealth of Independent States and Asian countries in TIMSS. Content balance and years of schooling explain most of the variation.

== Reception ==
The results from PISA 2003 and PISA 2006 were featured in the 2010 documentary Waiting for "Superman".

=== China ===
Education professor Yong Zhao has noted that PISA 2009 did not receive much attention in the Chinese media, and that the high scores in China are due to excessive workload and testing, adding that it's "no news that the Chinese education system is excellent in preparing outstanding test takers, just like other education systems within the Confucian cultural circle: Singapore, Korea, Japan, and Hong Kong."

Students from Shanghai, China, had the top scores of every category (Mathematics, Reading and Science) in PISA 2009. In discussing these results, PISA spokesman Andreas Schleicher, Deputy Director for Education and head of the analysis division at the OECD’s directorate for education, described Shanghai as a pioneer of educational reform in which "there has been a sea change in pedagogy". Schleicher stated that Shanghai abandoned its "focus on educating a small elite, and instead worked to construct a more inclusive system. They also significantly increased teacher pay and training, reducing the emphasis on rote learning and focusing classroom activities on problem solving."

Schleicher also states that PISA tests administered in rural China have produced some results approaching the OECD average: Citing further, as-yet-unpublished OECD research, Schleicher said, "We have actually done Pisa in 12 of the provinces in China. Even in some of the very poor areas you get performance close to the OECD average." Schleicher says that for a developing country, China's 99.4% enrollment in primary education is "the envy of many countries". He maintains that junior secondary school participation rates in China are now 99%; and in Shanghai, not only has senior secondary school enrollment attained 98%, but admissions into higher education have achieved 80% of the relevant age group. Schleicher believes that this growth reflects quality, not just quantity, which he contends the top PISA ranking of Shanghai's secondary education confirms. Schleicher believes that China has also expanded school access and has moved away from learning by rote. According to Schleicher, Russia performs well in rote-based assessments, but not in PISA, whereas China does well in both rote-based and broader assessments.

=== Denmark ===
University of Copenhagen Professor Svend Kreiner, who examined in detail PISA's 2006 reading results, noted that in 2006 only about ten percent of the students who took part in PISA were tested on all 28 reading questions. "This in itself is ridiculous," Kreiner told Stewart. "Most people don't know that half of the students taking part in PISA (2006) do not respond to any reading item at all. Despite that, PISA assigns reading scores to these children."

=== Finland ===
The stable, high marks of Finnish students have attracted a lot of attention. According to Hannu Simola the results reflect a paradoxical mix of progressive policies implemented through a rather conservative pedagogic setting, where the high levels of teachers' academic preparation, social status, professionalism and motivation for the job are concomitant with the adherence to traditional roles and methods by both teachers and pupils in Finland's changing, but still quite paternalistic culture. Others advance Finland's low poverty rate as a reason for its success. Finnish education reformer Pasi Sahlberg attributes Finland's high educational achievements to its emphasis on social and educational equality and stress on cooperation and collaboration, as opposed to the competition among teachers and schools that prevails in other nations.

=== India ===
Of the 74 countries tested in the PISA 2009 cycle including the "+" nations, the two Indian states came up 72nd and 73rd out of 74 in both reading and mathematics, and 73rd and 74th in science. In Himachal Pradesh, 57.9 percent of 15 year olds in school cannot be distinguished from not having learned any science at all and in TN 43.6 percent all in this category - ten times as many as the USA. The estimate of the fraction of Tamil Nadu or Himachal Pradesh students at level 6 in science proficiency was zero. Their estimate of the fraction at level 5: also zero. Compared to this, about 20 percent of Singapore students reach at least level 5 or 6, while those below level 1 is only 2.8 percent. India's poor performance may not be linguistic as some suggested. 12.87% of US students, for example, indicated that the language of the test differed from the language spoken at home. while 30.77% of Himachal Pradesh students indicated that the language of the test differed from the language spoken at home, a significantly higher percent However, unlike American students, those Indian students with a different language at home did better on the PISA test than those with the same language. India's poor performance on the PISA test is consistent with India's poor performance in the only other instance when India's government allowed an international organization to test its students and consistent with India's own testing of its elite students in a study titled Student Learning in the Metros 2006. These studies were conducted using TIMSS questions. The poor result in PISA was greeted with dismay in the Indian media. The BBC reported that as of 2008, only 15% of India's students reach high school.

=== Italy / South Tyrol ===
In 2003 South Tyrol (Provincia Autonoma di Bolzano / Autonome Provinz Bozen), a predominantly German-speaking province in the north of Italy, took part in the PISA project for the first time in order to have a regional result as an adjudicated region. In the rest of Italy PISA is conducted by INVALSI (Istituto nazionale per la valutazione del sistema educativo di istruzione e di formazione), a formally independent research institution affiliated to the Ministry of Education, whereas in South Tyrol PISA was carried out by the regional Education Authority itself (Intendenza scolastica / Schulamt, since 2018 renamed into Bildungsdirektion), which is part of the South Tyrolean regional government. At the end of 2004, in the months prior to the announcement of the test results, the regional Education Authority in Bolzano / Bozen downplayed the validity of the PISA assessment and commissioned alternative school evaluations, preparing the public for a mediocre test result. According to the official PISA report 2003, however, South Tyrol seemed to even beat the PISA world champion Finland.

Critique

Right from the beginning, there was scepticism as to how South Tyrol succeeded in outdoing the neighbouring Italian and Austrian provinces. On the front page of its weekend edition for 29/30 January 2005, the South Tyrolean newspaper Neue Südtiroler Tageszeitung published a harsh critique and revealed that the South Tyrolean Education Authority had secretly eliminated more than 300 students from the 1500 students officially drawn as South Tyrolean test sample by the PISA Consortium, and soon more inconsistencies were to surface:

- Lack of independence of the South Tyrolean PISA board: In South Tyrol, PISA was not conducted by a nominally independent body like the local university Freie Universität Bozen or the European Academy EURAC, both of which have ample expertise in the field of education, but by the so-called Pedagogical Institute (Pädagogisches Institut, director: Rudolf Meraner), which was part of the Education Authority, which in its turn was part of the regional government. A few years later the Pedagogical Institute was nominally absorbed into the Education Authority and renamed into Department for Innovation and Counselling (with the same director: Rudolf Meraner).
- Exploitation for political ends: In the most influential mass media, the regional PISA results were presented as a triumph of the regional government and the SVP (Südtiroler Volkspartei or South Tyrolean People’s Party) ruling party’s policy, although the legal framework for all high schools in Italy is a purely national domain. For all the political autonomy granted to South Tyrol, this region still has the same types of schools and follows the same curricula as do all Italian regions. Mass media like the most-read South Tyrolean newspaper, Dolomiten, whose owner Michel Ebner is a prominent party member of the ruling SVP, did not either try to explain why the secondary schools attended by the Italian speaking students in the same Province did considerably worse, although it is the same regional government run by the SVP which is in charge of the Italian and the German school administration.
- Harassment of Critics: People who criticized the official PISA results and pointed out violations of the technical rules were officially threatened by the provincial governor, Luis Durnwalder, with libel action for slandering South Tyrol. On 16 March 2006, Durnwalder announced in a press conference that an Austrian teacher would be prosecuted and sued for damages simply because the teacher, in a letter sent to the Austrian Ministry of Education, had mentioned the fact that the South Tyrolean Education Authority had eliminated 17 percent of the students from the regional sample, thereby rendering invalid the regional PISA result. A year later, however, Mr Durnwalder had to admit that he had never taken legal action against the teacher and that there were no legal proceedings obviously because the critique was correct. It is also noteworthy that the director of the Pedagogical Institute, Rudolf Meraner, and others have constantly deleted the original German Wikipedia article about the South Tyrolean PISA results, replacing it with public government statements.
- Regional results deliberately misrepresented as national results: By definition, the PISA result of South Tyrol is a subregional result, which is not fully valid because of the small sample of 1500 students. Such regional results mainly serve documentary purposes and cannot be compared with national results. Nonetheless, the South Tyrolean Education Authority and the regional government repeatedly, and falsely, claimed that the South Tyrolean test results are national, i.e. fully valid results, whereas the neighbouring regions like Tyrol (Austria) and Trentino (Italy), according to South Tyrolean press releases, only had subnational results.
- Manipulation of the sample: Elimination of 17 percent of students: For a subnational result, regions had to test 1500 students. Among all regions with a subnational result, worldwide, South Tyrol was the only one that failed to test 1500 students. For reasons never specified, the Education Authority had eliminated 292 students (i.e. 17 percent) from the 1500 students sample, testing only 1208 of the students selected by the PISA consortium. Failing to test all 1500 students, the South Tyrolean Education Authority violated the technical PISA rules and deprived the PISA result even of its limited technical validity as a subnational result. Later on the Education Authority had to admit that it had actually excluded all vocational students, whose performance is generally considered to be inferior to that of high schools, and all students of the third forms of so-called middle schools (scuole medie / Mittelschulen), who would have been part of the sample only if they repeated a class and were considered underachievers because normally 15 year old students are enrolled at high schools. From the official PISA report this manipulation can be easily deduced as the difference between total population of 15-year-olds (4.908) and total enrolled population of 15-year-olds at grade 7 or above (4.087). In subsequent PISA assessments, the OECD or rather the PISA consortium did not publish these key figures so that it was no longer possible to ascertain the number of students eliminated from the sample against the rules.
- Incorrect figures about Target Population and actual sample: In Italy, according to the figures officially made available by the INVALSI, the number of all 15-year-old students (574.611) paradoxically exceeds the number of all 15-year-old people (561.304). Due to this mistake, it is impossible to establish how many Italian students were actually identified as Italian target population, and it is also impossible to find out which percentage of South Tyrolean students had actually been presented as target population to the PISA consortium. In theory, the Education Authority could have excluded certain types of students from the target population even before the sample of 1500 students was drawn by the PISA consortium, from which the Education Authority later on eliminated 17 percent.

Comparison with similar assessments

The stunning South Tyrolean 2003 PISA results can hardly be reconciled with similar high school evaluations, which were not conducted or influenced by the South Tyrolean Education Authority itself. Three international or national large scale assessment projects painted a gloomy picture of the South Tyrolean students’ performance.

- Admission Test at Austrian Universities of Medicine (EMS = Eignungstest für das Medizinstudium): Over the last two decades, candidates graduating from South Tyrolean high schools have traditionally scored very badly at the entry examination. The quota system at Austrian Universities of Medicine makes sure that 75 percent of all applicants admitted to Medicine are Austrian nationals or students from South Tyrol, who are considered an Austrian minority in Italy. Hence, for Austrians and South Tyroleans it is easier to get a place at an Austrian University of Medicine, even with bad scores, than for Germans and other EU nationals because the number of EU students must not exceed 20 percent. Nevertheless, according to a study financed by the Austrian Ministry of Education, not even within the big 75 percent quota, South Tyroleans could get a place because of their mediocre entrance test results. South Tyrolean applicants had an average score of 96,5 whereas e.g. German applicants had an average score of 103,1. Interestingly, South Tyrolean applicants did even worse than Austrian applicants although Italian high school graduates are one year older. What is even worse, South Tyrolean high school graduates show a sharp gender gap with female candidates doing much worse than their male colleagues, which reflects the Italian high school system: Certain types of high schools popular with female students (e.g. licei linguistici, licei scienze umane) have little mathematics and sciences. The difference between the average female and the average male South Tyrolean score in the 2007 EMS was dramatic: 94,8 versus 100,1 points. Later on the Swiss EMS organisation disallowed the Austrian Universities of Medicine to use its EMS test and the Austrian universities introduced a new entrance test scheme with an extra quota for female students. South Tyrolean mass media did not cover the EMS debacle at all. Within the South Tyrolean parliament, however, there have been debates as to the reasons of the poor performance of South Tyrolean high school students. As a consequence of the EMS debacle, the former South Tyrolean governor, Luis Durnwalder, envisaged a collaboration between the University of Medicine in Innsbruck and the Hospital in Bolzano (Bozen) which should have led to a Euregio Medical School open to all North Tyrolean (i.e. Austrian) and South Tyrolean applicants without any entrance exam. Eventually, the South Tyrolean government adopted a more pragmatic approach, it subsidized, as it were, extra places for South Tyrolean students. This seems to be a breach of the national quota system and the entrance requirements as outlined by Austrian laws. The former South Tyrolean governor, Luis Durnwalder, however, frankly admitted to resort to this solution when he complained about the high amount of money South Tyrol paid to the University of Medicine in Innsbruck for buying extra places for South Tyrolean students.
- German DESI assessment of linguistic skills in German (mother tongue) and English (foreign language): Parallel with the 2003 PISA assessment, the South Tyrolean Education Authority commissioned a second assessment, obviously because the Education Authority expected a mediocre PISA result and had downplayed the importance of PISA. Like PISA, the DESI assessment was conducted against the technical rules because, again, all vocational students attending a vocational school (Berufsschule) and working part-time in a workshop or small firm, i.e. one third of the target population was excluded from the test. The South Tyrolean Education Authority also excluded the whole English test section from DESI, thereby depriving DESI of its main purpose, namely a comparison of German speaking students’ language competence in L1 and L2. The South Tyrolean Education Authority argued that in (bilingual) South Tyrol, German speaking students start with Italian as their first foreign language at elementary schools. This explanation, however, lacks credibility because in Germany, as well, many students assessed by DESI had main foreign languages other than English, e.g. French or even Latin (Bavaria), and the amount of weekly classroom teaching in English from the first form at elementary schools is the same in Germany and South Tyrol. In their official report, the German experts responsible for the DESI assessment in South Tyrol generally praised the quality of teaching, but the concrete results in the report reveal drastic shortcomings. For instance, in the semantic field of railway station (Bahnhof), not even one South Tyrolean student with German as his or her mother tongue knew the German word for a signal box (Stellwerk). Instead of marking such errors as errors, however, the German experts resorted to a methodologically disputable assumption. They claimed, without checking, that all words which South Tyrolean students did not know are, by definition, not used in the South Tyrolean variant of German and that these words must be excluded from the test (item bias), thus counting only correct answers. The DESI testers from Germany, however, did not check if the words excluded from DESI because of item bias actually were unknown. In fact, all words excluded from the South Tyrolean DESI questionnaire are common German words used in South Tyrol as well, i.e. for these words there are no South Tyrolean variants at all. For all the technical exceptions and modifications, the 2003 South Tyrolean DESI result was very disappointing. Only 14 percent of the South Tyrolean high school students came into the best achievement group, whereas in Germany almost half of the 15 year old students belong to this group. On the other hand, one fourth of the South Tyrolean German speaking students came into the lowest achievement group, which in Germany, in spite of all social problems in big towns, comprises only 7 percent of all students.
- Italian INVALSI assessments: Traditionally, the annual assessments conducted by the Italian INVALSI in the pre-PISA period painted a sorry picture of the northernmost Italian Regione Autonoma di Trentino e Alto Adige comprising the two autonomous provinces called Trentino (Italian speaking) and South Tyrol (predominantly German speaking). Schools in Trentino and South Tyrol did constantly worse than those in all other North Italian regions and even lagged behind the Italian average, though it is not clear if the sample of German speaking students was representative because, again, the South Tyrolean Education Authority was entitled to eliminate bad schools from the sample, thereby manipulating the validity of the assessment. To some extent, two South Tyrolean anomalies may account for the traditional bad performance of South Tyrolean students in international evaluations. Until recently, no pedagogical qualifications were required for teachers, not even for permanently employed teachers (insegnanti di ruolo / Stammrollenlehrer) appointed by the Education Authority in Bolzano (Bozen) through a so-called concorso. Besides, the admission criteria for the South Tyrolean concorsi have always been inconsistent. For example, a South Tyrolean student who studied at an Italian university German as a Foreign Language or Art History, automatically obtained the teaching license for completely unrelated subjects, like History and Latin, at South Tyrolean high schools.

=== United States ===
Two studies have compared high achievers in mathematics on the PISA and those on the U.S. National Assessment of Educational Progress (NAEP). Comparisons were made between those scoring at the "advanced" and "proficient" levels in mathematics on the NAEP with the corresponding performance on the PISA. Overall, 30 nations had higher percentages than the U.S. of students at the "advanced" level of mathematics. The only OECD countries with worse results were Portugal, Greece, Turkey, and Mexico. Six percent of U.S. students were "advanced" in mathematics compared to 28 percent in Taiwan. The highest ranked state in the U.S. (Massachusetts) was just 15th in the world if it was compared with the nations participating in the PISA. 31 nations had higher percentages of "proficient" students than the U.S. Massachusetts was again the best U.S. state, but it ranked just ninth in the world if compared with the nations participating in the PISA.

Comparisons with results for the Trends in International Mathematics and Science Study (TIMSS) appear to give different results—suggesting that the U.S. states actually do better in world rankings. This can likely be traced to the different material being covered and the United States teaching mathematics in a style less harmonious with the "Realistic Mathematics Education" which forms the basis of the exam. Countries that commonly use this teaching method score higher on PISA, and less highly on TIMSS and other assessments.

==== Poverty ====
Stephen Krassen, professor emeritus at the University of Southern California, and Mel Riddile of the NASSP attributed the relatively low performance of students in the United States to the country's high rate of child poverty, which exceeds that of other OECD countries. However, individual US schools with poverty rates comparable to Finland's (below 10%), as measured by reduced-price school lunch participation, outperform Finland; and US schools in the 10–24% reduced-price lunch range are not far behind.

Reduced school lunch participation is the only available intra-poverty indicator for US schoolchildren. In the United States, schools in locations in which less than 10% of the students qualified for free or reduced-price lunch averaged PISA scores of 551 (higher than any other OECD country). This can be compared with the other OECD countries (which have tabled figures on children living in relative poverty):

Country	Percent of reduced school lunches (US) Percent of relative child poverty (Other OECD countries)	PISA score
United States	< 10%	551
Finland	3.4%	536
Netherlands	9.0%	508
Belgium	6.7%	506
United States	10%–24.9%	527
Canada	13.6%	524
New Zealand	16.3%	521
Japan	14.3%	520
Australia	11.6%	515
United States	25–49.9%	502
Estonia	40.1%	501
United States	50–74.9%	471
Russian Federation	58.3%	459
United States	> 75%	446

==== Sampling errors ====
In 2013 Martin Carnoy of the Stanford University Graduate School of Education and Richard Rothstein of the Economic Policy Institute released a report, "What do international tests really show about U.S. student performance?", analyzing the 2009 PISA data base. Their report found that U.S. PISA test scores had been lowered by a sampling error that over-represented adolescents from the most disadvantaged American schools in the test-taking sample. The authors cautioned that international test scores are often "interpreted to show that American students perform poorly when compared to students internationally" and that school reformers then conclude that "U.S. public education is failing." Such inferences, made before the data has been carefully analyzed, they say, "are too glib" and "may lead policymakers to pursue inappropriate and even harmful reforms."

Carnoy and Rothstein observe that in all countries, students from disadvantaged backgrounds perform worse than those from advantaged backgrounds, and the US has a greater percentage of students from disadvantaged backgrounds. The sampling error on the PISA results lowered U.S. scores for 15-year-olds even further, they say. The authors add, however, that in countries such as Finland, the scores of disadvantaged students tends to be stagnant, whereas in the U.S the scores of disadvantaged students have been steadily rising over time, albeit still lagging behind their those of their more advantaged peers. When the figures are adjusted for social class, the PISA scores of all US students would still remain behind those of the highest scoring countries, nevertheless, the scores of US students of all social backgrounds have shown a trajectory of improvement over time, notably in mathematics, a circumstance PISA's report fails to take into account.

Carnoy and Rothstein write that PISA spokesman Schleicher has been quoted saying that "international education benchmarks make disappointing reading for the U.S." and that "in the U.S. in particular, poverty was destiny. Low-income American students did (and still do) much worse than high-income ones on PISA. But poor kids in Finland and Canada do far better relative to their more privileged peers, despite their disadvantages" (Ripley 2011). Carnoy and Rothstein state that their report's analysis shows Schleicher and Ripley's claims to be untrue. They further fault the way PISA's results have persistently been released to the press before experts have time to evaluate them; and they charge the OECD reports with inconsistency in explaining such factors as the role of parental education. Carnoy and Rothstein also note with alarm that the US secretary of education Arne Duncan regularly consults with PISA's Andreas Schleicher in formulating educational policy before other experts have been given a chance to analyze the results. Carnoy and Rothstein's report (written before the release of the 2011 database) concludes:

We are most certain of this: To make judgments only on the basis of national average scores, on only one test, at only one point in time, without comparing trends on different tests that purport to measure the same thing, and without disaggregation by social class groups, is the worst possible choice. But, unfortunately, this is how most policymakers and analysts approach the field.

The most recent test for which an international database is presently available is PISA, administered in 2009. A database for TIMSS 2011 is scheduled for release in mid-January 2013. In December 2013, PISA will announce results and make data available from its 2012 test administration. Scholars will then be able to dig into TIMSS 2011 and PISA 2012 databases so they can place the publicly promoted average national results in proper context. The analyses we have presented in this report should caution policymakers to await understanding of this context before drawing conclusions about lessons from TIMSS or PISA assessments.
