= History of infant schools in Great Britain =

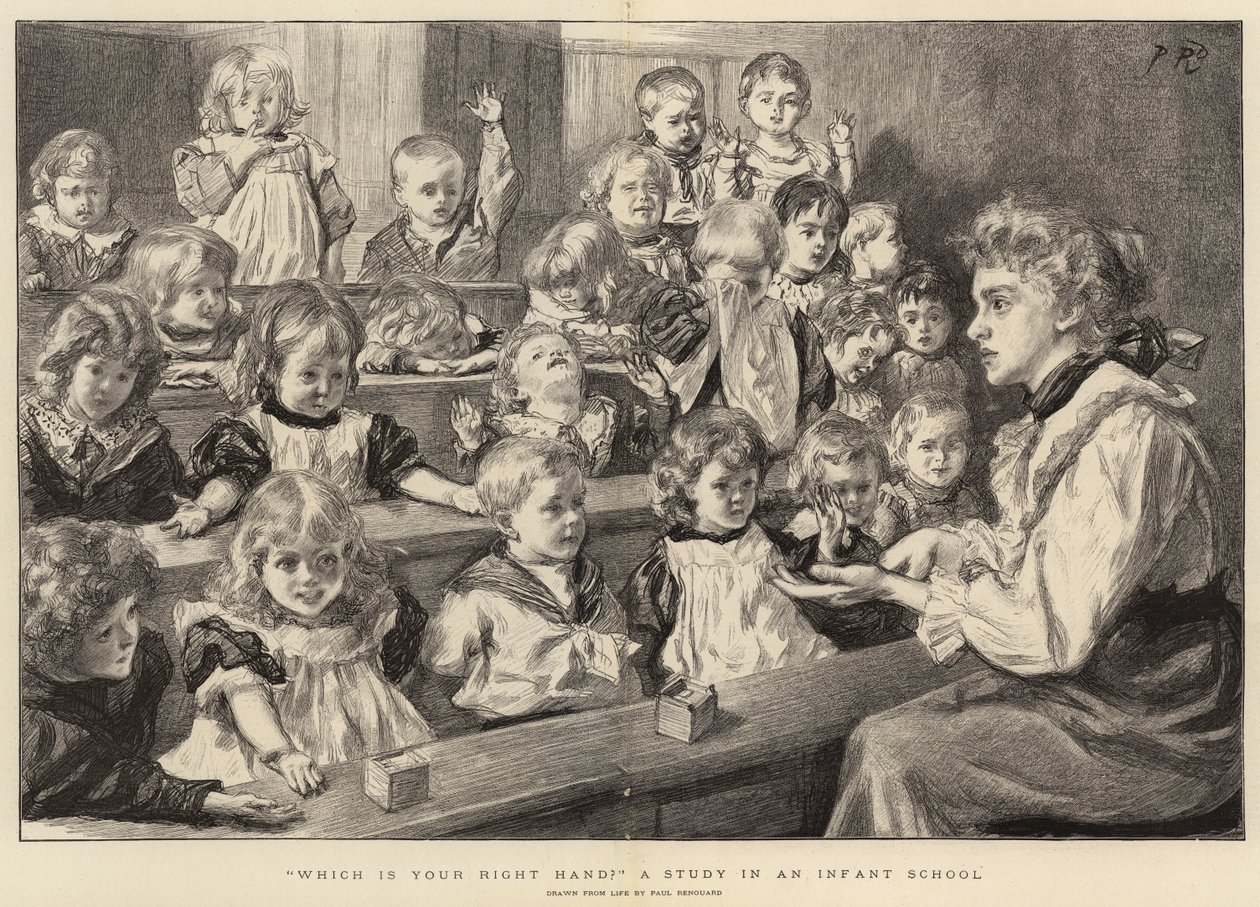
Which is your Right Hand?, illustration of an unidentified infant class drawn by Paul Renouard and published in The Graphic (1898) (Note: Tiered galleries were a usual aspect of infant teaching in the 19th century, the "low gallery" depicted here is a later design that allowed the teacher to be closer to the children. Kindergarten materials can also be seen on the desks.)

The first infant school in Great Britain was founded in New Lanark, Scotland, in 1816. It was followed by other philanthropic infant schools across Great Britain. Early childhood education was a new concept at the time and seen as a potential solution to social problems related to industrialisation. Numerous writers published works on the subject and developed a theory of infant teaching. This included moral education, physical exercise and an authoritative but friendly teacher.

In England and Wales, infant schools served to maximise the education children could receive before they left school to start work. They were valued by parents as a form of childcare but proved less popular in Scotland. State-funded schools in England and Wales were advised in 1840 to include infant departments within their grounds. As it was integrated into the state system, infant education in England and Wales came under pressure to achieve quick academic progress in children and shifted towards rote learning. The new "kindergarten" methods of teaching young children had some limited influence on the curriculum in the late 19th century.

Beginning in 1905, infant education in England and Wales shifted towards more child-centred methods of teaching, where education was meant to reflect the preferences of children. Many of the youngest children, under five, who were considered ill-suited to school, were removed entirely, though some nursery classes were later attached to infant schools to cater to this age group. The child-centred approach reached its peak following a report in 1967. In 1988, a more centralised curriculum was introduced, but there have been moves away from that in Wales since devolution. The term "infant department" for the early years at school was used widely in Scotland in the 1960s but is no longer generally used there.

== Terminology ==
The term infant school is used in the United Kingdom. It refers either to a separate school or to part of a larger school such as a primary school. Dictionaries give various age ranges for this phase of education. Cambridge describes infant schools as "for children who are four to seven years old". Collins defines them as "for children between the ages of five and seven". Merriam-Webster uses the age range from "five to seven or eight". Oxford does not give a lower age limit, just stating "usually under seven years of age". A UK government document published in 2013 described "infant (5 to 7 or 8)" as the middle phase of primary education in England and Wales but commented that "in Scotland and Northern Ireland there is generally no distinction between infant and junior schools."

== Background ==
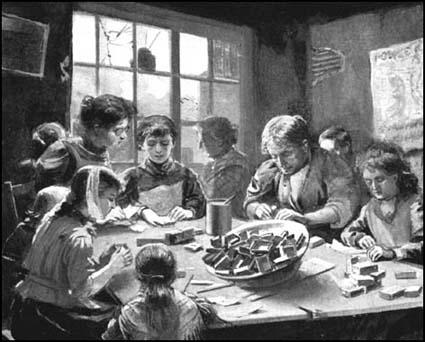
Illustration of a family making matches in The Child Slaves of Britain (1905) by Robert Sherard.

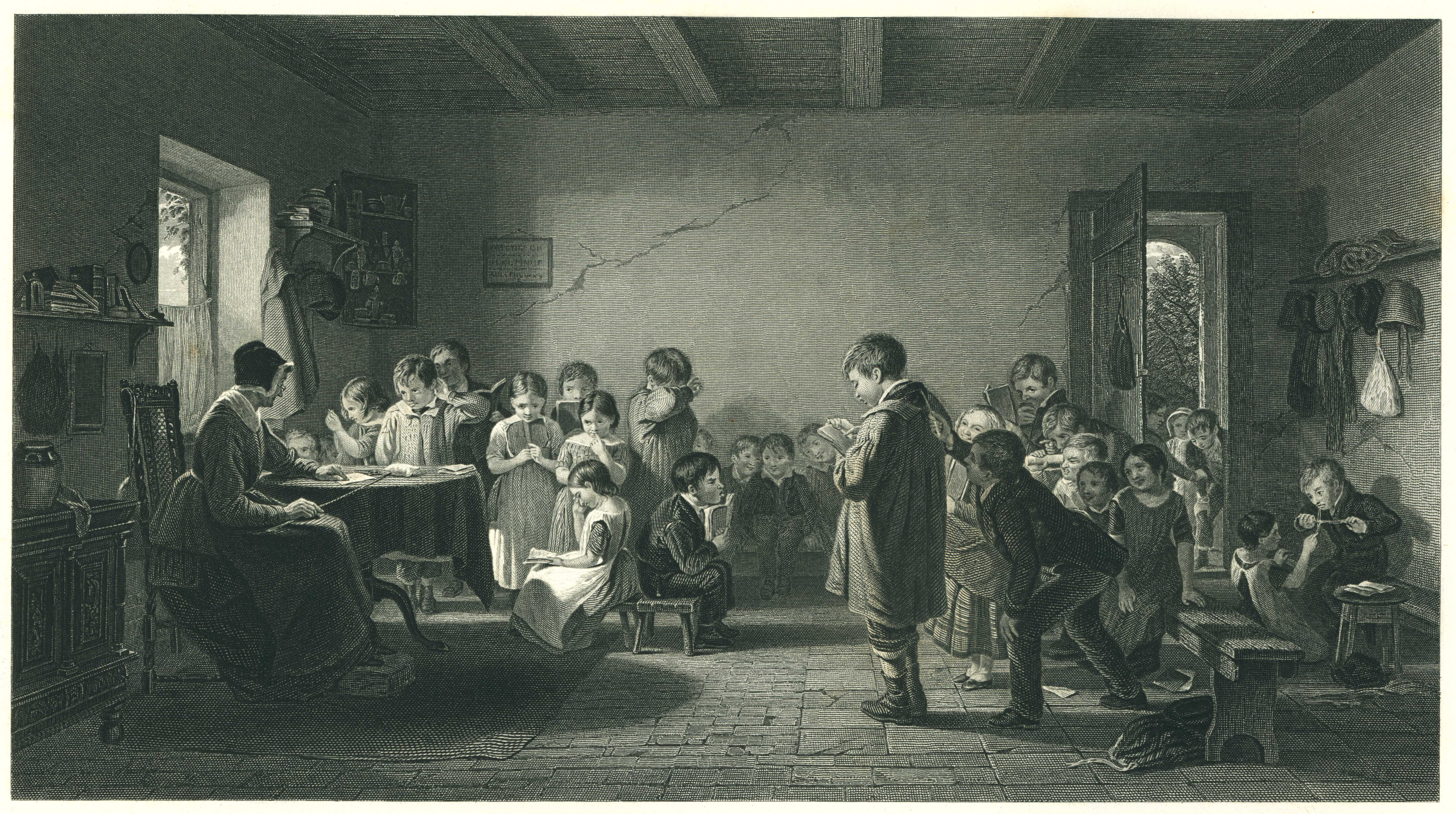
A dame's school by Thomas George Webster (1866)

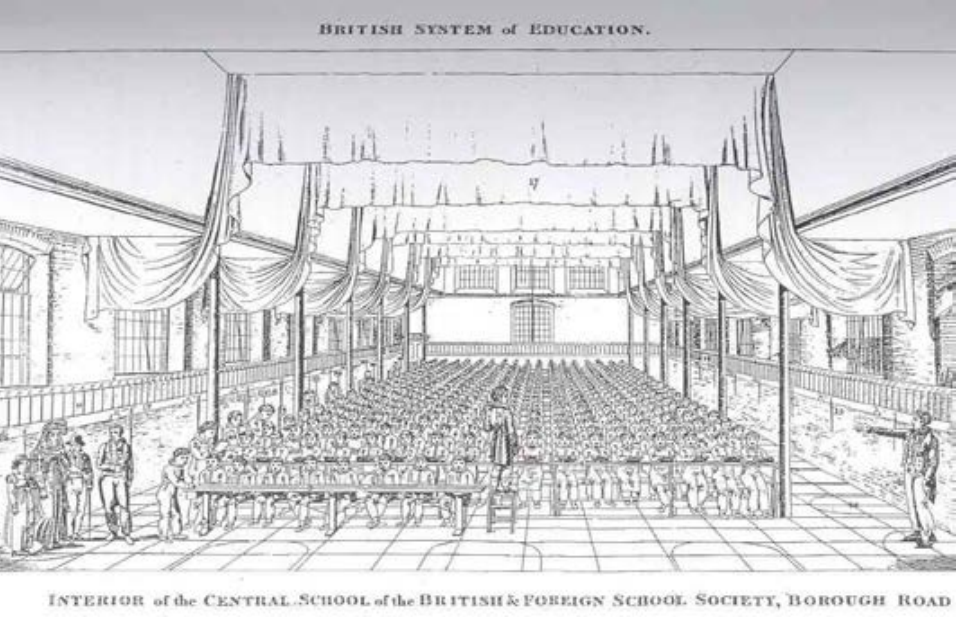
Example of a voluntary society school. Drawn by an unknown illustrator (1817)

Before the 19th century, children learnt the skills needed for work and home life from their families at an early age. Children below the age of eight frequently attended the village or grammar schools. No particular accommodation would have been made for the younger children as these were single-room institutions that catered to a wide range of ages. The limited group of children who had access to schooling generally started their education at home. There were some institutions similar to infant schools in continental Western Europe dating from the second half of the 18th century and early 19th century, including one that was established by J. F. Oberlin.

During the agricultural and industrial revolutions, new forms of child labour developed in factories, which enforced more intensive and disciplined conditions than children had experienced while working under the supervision of parents in pre-industrial times. While factory labourers were typically (but not exclusively) older than eight, children as young as three years did contractual work at home or were employed as climbing boys to clean the inside of chimneys. Many young children with working mothers were left alone or in the care of older children. Dame schools provided a cheap childminding service, generally with low standards of care and education.

Interest developed in expanding access to education as this situation came to public attention. Reformers attempted to protect children from suffering, while instructing them in morality, religion and obedience. The British and Foreign School Society and the National Society for Promoting Religious Education were established in 1808 and 1811 respectively to found new "voluntary schools". These schools were intended for children of "school age", which was understood to mean older than six or usually seven, although children as young as four years were sometimes admitted. Joseph Lancaster (1778–1838), an influential educational theorist, believed that "initiatory" schools should be created to provide safety and education focused on personal character to children younger than seven years. However, the societies did not aim to cater for the younger age group, and no initiatory schools were established. In 1833, the societies began to receive government funding.

== Early infant schools ==
=== First establishments ===
The first infant school in Great Britain was established in 1816 for the children of mill workers in New Lanark, Lanarkshire, in Scotland. It was founded by Robert Owen, who was manager of the cotton mills there. The school catered for children between one and six years old. Information about this infant school is quite limited; accounts often focus more on the uniqueness of the experiment rather than on the activities in the school. The children appear to have spent much of their time playing, but there was also some formal education. In 1819, children under the age of four were reported to be learning to recognise letters. Older children were organised into a different class and taught to read simple texts. Owen believed that every aspect of a child's personality was formed by the circumstances in which they grew up; he saw the infant school as a way of minimising negative influences from the family home. He saw child labour as damaging, and forbade children under the age of ten from working in his factory. Owen was sceptical of toys, and the children largely did activities that did not require physical objects, such as singing, dancing, and marching.

In 1818, the first infant school in England was sponsored by Henry Brougham, and other political radicals, in Brewer's Green, Westminster, London. Brougham believed that the first years of life were developmentally important, but placed less value on early education than Owen. He was primarily interested in providing childcare and moral instruction. He employed James Buchanan, a teacher who had previously worked at New Lanark, and used similar methods to the first infant school. The families who lived in the slums around Brewer's Green were initially reluctant to send their children to the infant school. Brougham put significant effort into recruitment, and numbers increased sharply over several months. Two further infant schools were established in London over the next six years. The London Infant School Society was active from 1824 to 1835. It had some success with founding new infant schools but less in training teachers. The London Society was followed by other regional societies including in Leicester and Glasgow. Employers also established factory infant schools with the aim of preparing pupils to be better-behaved child labourers when they started work.

=== Theory and motivation ===
Samuel Wilderspin was an advocate of infant schools across England. The philosophy he promulgated had more emphasis on formal instruction than Owen's, though he tried to adapt the instruction to the abilities of young children. Nanette Whitbread, an educationalist, suggests that Wilderspin had some understanding of young children but lacked a "unifying pedagogical theory". In Glasgow, David Stow was a promoter of infant schools who remained truer to Owen's aims even with an increased focus on class teaching. Various other figures also established infant schools and wrote books about the subject. David Turner, an academic who studied 19th-century infant schools, wrote that the pedagogy of the various early iterations of infant schools were heavily influenced by Owen's ideas. He commented;

By the mid 1830's the schools had sometimes become training grounds for the lower classes, to accustom them to good habits and industry and to prepare them for National [Society for Promoting Religious Education] or British [and Foreign School Society] schools. There was an increasing emphasis on religion, yet the essentials of the system remained: the acceptance of very young children; learning through play; a variety of short lessons; exercise in the playground, and the cultivation of kindly feelings. Some of the methods sometimes deteriorated into mere rote-learning and marching displays ... but the system had at least permeated the country, and had survived through the pioneering efforts of enthusiastic individuals and the financial support of enlightened philanthropists.

Infant schools were intended to be both an ordered environment and give children freedom. Children were seen in a generally positive light and as likely to cooperate if well managed. They would ideally develop an affectionate relationship with the teacher that would motivate them to learn. These ideas had little connection to a philosophy about child development or education. Some links existed to the ideas of Emanuel Swedenborg, a Swedish philosopher. There were also connections between the infant school movement and phrenology, a pseudoscientific theory about how human thought works that was popular at the time. However, the focus of those promoting infant schools was the issue of finding cheap and effective ways to educate large groups of young children.

Promoters of infant schools were interested in reducing petty crime and protecting property. The years after 1811 saw a sharp increase in birth rates; juvenile crime rates increased as young children were often left alone while their parents and older siblings worked. H. Silver, a historian, argued that people associated the threat posed to their property by crime with the perceived threat posed to their property by politics (i.e. a revolution in the style of the French Revolution). Alasdair F. B. Roberts, an educationalist, suggests that the decline in financial support given to infant school societies in the late 1820s, as revolutionary activity declined, might be evidence of this. There were also a variety of motivations for supporters of various ideological views. In England, the focus was usually on child welfare along with inculcating moral virtues, discipline and practical skills. In Scotland, where the concept of mass schooling was more established, there was greater interest in adapting education for young children. Some people opposed the infant schools, worrying about Owen's socialist political views or seeing them as a form of interference in family life.

=== Evolution ===
Overall in Britain, the early infant school movement was strongest in London and Glasgow. W. B. Stephens, a historian, is sceptical of the movement, suggesting that infant schools gradually lost most of their distinctiveness and failed to become the preferred childcare option for working-class parents. Teachers, who were largely untrained and under pressure from the lack of time children had to attend school, often focused on introducing children to discipline and formal instruction. Infant schools frequently evolved into institutions focused on preparing children for the voluntary schools, neglecting more play-based aspects of the curriculum. Whitbread argued that this did not reflect the priorities of parents, who were often quite happy to send their children to infant schools that offered some entertainment, in preference to dame schools. In contrast, Roberts argued that early infant schools had limited appeal because working-class parents did not see the value of schools where children appeared to spend their time playing, and resented what they saw as a middle-class attempt to influence their children. He noted that certain infant schools closed in the 1830s and suggested that this was due to both a lack of financial support and an unenthusiastic response from parents.

Whitbread comments that the early infant schools offered safety and a degree of compassion to young children living in a difficult environment with few other options. Laura Novo, an academic at Columbia University, comments that infant schools were more open to new methods than most other aspects of 19th-century teaching. By 1836, there were 3,000 infant schools in England alone, attended by 90,000 children. They usually catered to both boys and girls. Early infant schools were sometimes used to teach English to Welsh- or Scottish Gaelic-speaking children; Wilderspin believed they were effective at language teaching.

== Mid-19th century development ==
=== Theoretical influences, training and inspection ===
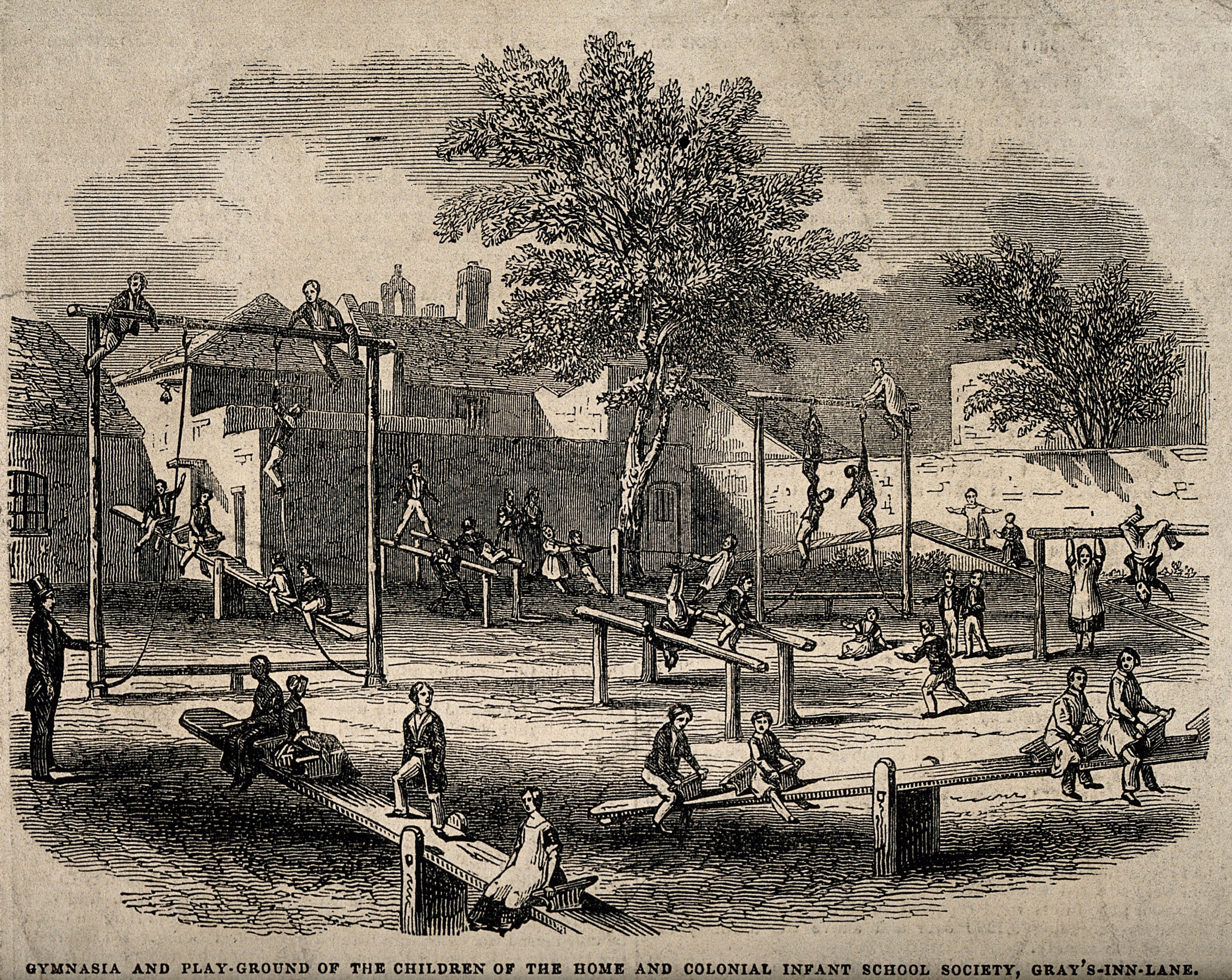
Illustration of an infant school run by the Home and Colonial Infant School Society as a training school for infant teachers (c. 1840)

Interest developed in the educational theories of Johann Heinrich Pestalozzi after the end of the Napoleonic Wars in 1815. He believed that lessons should be conducted in a way that, though still guided by a teacher, gave the child more autonomy to think for themselves. For instance, the pupil might be allowed to examine an object before being told what it was. The Home and Colonial Infants School Society was founded in 1836 to train infant teachers and promote Pestalozzi's technique. By the 1840s, school inspectors preferred infant schools that used teachers trained by the society.

The Home and Colonial Infant School Society was the largest training college for infant teachers and was considered to be of a high standard. It also supplied equipment and teaching materials to infant schools. The college was an Anglican institution but also taught Nonconformists. Infant schools had a religious element to their teaching; Elizabeth Mayo, a prominent figure in the Home and Colonial Infant School Society, argued that religious and moral education should be the "paramount object" of infant schools. Though they tended to be quite non-sectarian by the standards of the time.

In 1840, guidance issued for newly introduced school inspectors in England and Wales mentioned specific questions for them to ask in infant schools. For instance, "What amusements have the children?" and "Are the children trained in walking, marching, and physical exercises, methodically?". Roberts suggests that some of the questions indicate a desire to avoid rote learning and maintain the original spirit of the system: for example, "Are the replies of the children made intelligently or mechanically or by rote? Do they appear to have confidence in their master or mistress [teacher] and to regard them with affection?". One school inspector, HMI (Note: "His or Her Majesty's Inspector" – Formal title for a school inspector) Fletcher, wrote in 1845 about the infant system "in the course of improvement in which it appears to be embarked, its preparatory labours will constantly increase in value as they become wider in scope and less ambitious in their immediate aim ... an education at once physical, intellectual, industrial, moral and religious." The school inspectorate usually supported the infant system but there was some opposition, especially from those who wanted an early start to academic education.

The monitorial system, which allowed a single teacher to educate a larger class by using a number of older children as intermediaries, was being used in some infant schools in the 1840s, with children up to nine years old acting as assistant teachers.

=== Teaching methods ===
In the mid-19th century, there was some ambiguity over the purpose of infant education. School inspectors believed that an infant stage of education was beneficial even if it "did nothing but contribute to their [the children's] health and cheerfulness" but also said children should be taught "to read an easy little narrative lesson, have the first notions of numbers, and be able to write on a slate". The Glasgow Herald reported on a local infant school in 1835, "They seldom sit on their seats more than fifteen minutes at a time without exercise. All is joyous activity—only pictures and objects are in use, and one-third of their time is spent in amusements in the playground." Research by a Royal Commission in 1861 indicated that older schoolchildren who had attended an infant school tended to be significantly ahead of those who had not. Nanette Whitbread commented on infant schools in this period:

Infant schools in England and Scotland by mid-century had certain characteristic features. The schoolroom was a large hall complete with gallery for simultaneous instruction, and the walls were lined with black boarding for the children to draw and write on. A playground, equipped with such apparatus as swings and see-saws, was required in any new infant school applying for grant. The curriculum included drawing, music, physical exercises, sewing, knitting, gardening, at least the preliminary steps towards reading and sometimes writing, and Pestalozzian 'object lessons' on natural objects and domestic utensils.

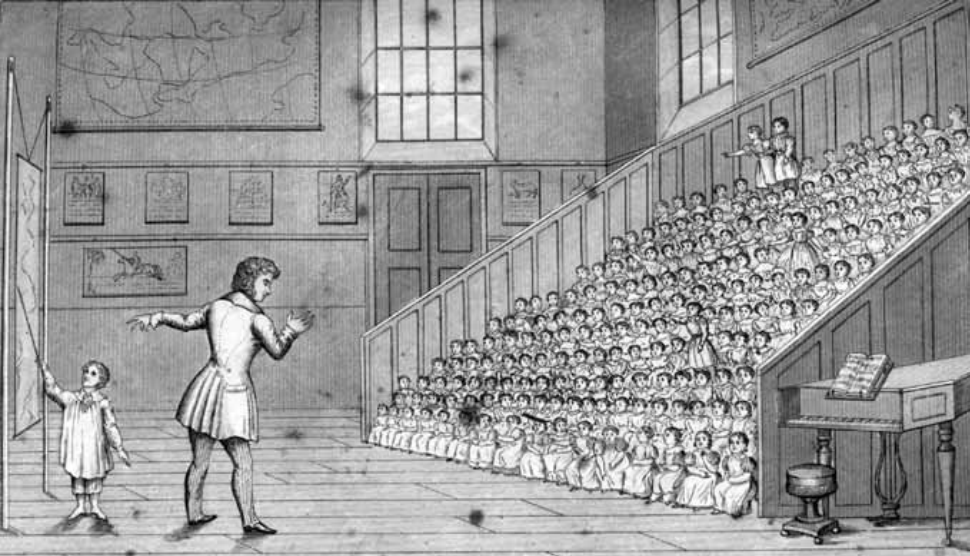
Depiction of a gallery in an infant class, appeared in A System for the Education of the Young, Applied to all Faculties by Samuel Wilderspin (1840)

Tiered galleries were structures in which children were seated in progressively higher rows, used when the whole class was being lectured by a teacher. Galleries were intended to restrict the movement of older children placed at the back, while giving them a clear view of the teacher as a reminder that they were being watched. It was hoped this would encourage self-control. The routine of entering and leaving the gallery reinforced the power hierarchy within the infant school.

Playgrounds were a new concept in the 19th century that had an important role in infant schools. Walled-in, in theory supervised, play areas were seen as a way to control children and thereby teach them to accept adult authority. Teachers were advised to allow accidents and minor incidents of bad behaviour; these could be used later as a negative example in a lesson about correct conduct. Play could take place indoors, but ideally an outdoor playground would be available which was designed to recreate the natural world. Children were provided with various equipment—such as building blocks, vaulting ropes and rotating swings—designed to develop the practical skills and physical strength needed for manual work. Play was often conducted in a disciplined, structured manner. For instance, children were expected to tidy away the blocks and wait in line while others used the swings. Some of the equipment was potentially dangerous, requiring significant skill and adult guidance to use correctly. For instance, Wilderspin's advice book on infant teaching included a chapter covering playground safety, that largely focused on swings.

=== Growth ===
The number of infant schools was growing rapidly by the middle of the 19th century. A second wave of industrialisation related to steam power and Irish immigration due to the Great Famine had led to the British population increasing. In 1851 around a quarter of people in Britain were children younger than ten years. Conditions worsened in the industrial slums and dame schools as the youthful population became more urbanised. This meant that infant schools increased in appeal and were often outstripped by demand. These schools' relatively low fees became more affordable as skilled workers' wages began to gradually increase after about 1842.

== Integration into state system and rote learning ==
=== Infant departments in state-funded schools ===
The number of children under seven in schools for older children increased in the middle of the 19th century. The first effective restrictions on the labour of children under the age of about nine or ten years were being introduced in some industries and technological advancement was reducing the usefulness of child labour. This meant that the number of seven-to-ten-year-old children available to attend school increased. Parents often relied on older children to provide childcare for younger children so they sent their three-to-six-year-old children to school with their older siblings. 19.8% of three to six-year-olds were attending schools for older children in 1861. School inspectors felt that large numbers of children younger than seven in schools for older children were disruptive to teaching. They did not want to entirely exclude these younger children to avoid older children being kept home to provide childcare. It also seemed sensible to start teaching at an early age as children did not tend to stay at school for long. A parliamentary committee in 1838 concluded that education should be made available to working-class children from the age of three years. In 1840 the Council on Education in England and Wales;

directed that a collateral series of plans of school-houses should be drawn, in which an infant school and playground are added to the schoolroom for children above six years of age, in the hope that these plans may promote the adoption of arrangements ... for the combination of an infant school with the [older] boys' and girls' school.

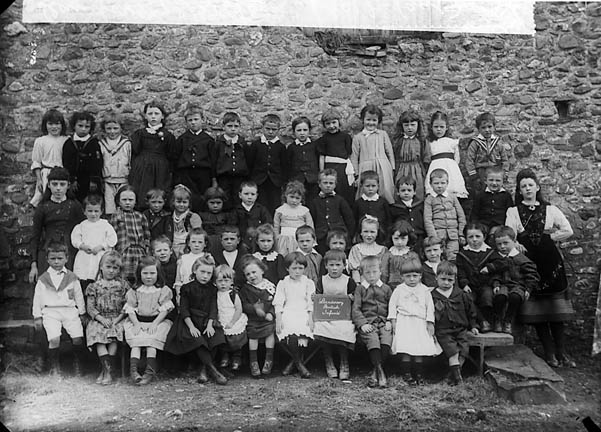
Infants class at a Nonconformist school in Llandovery, Carmarthenshire (1891)

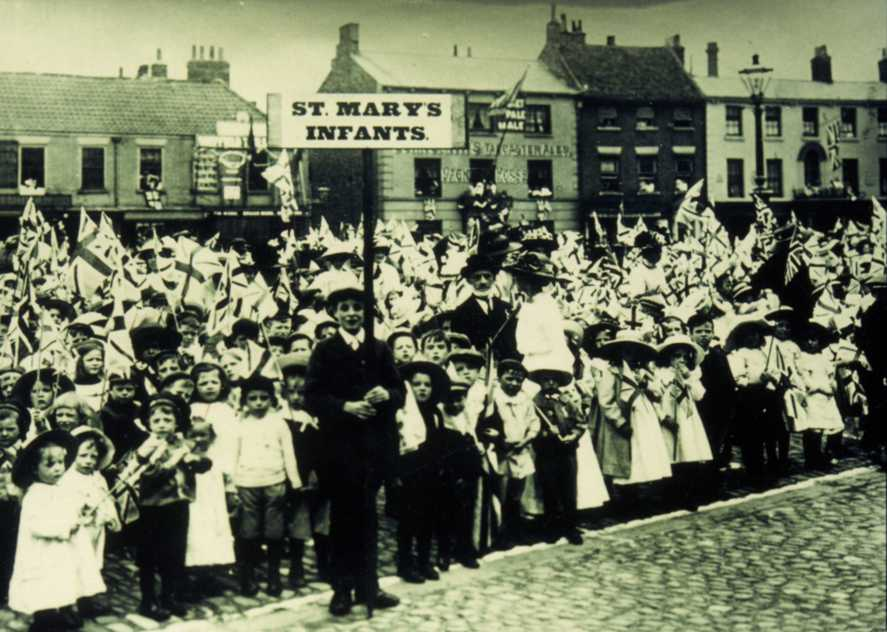
Pupils at St Mary's Infants School in West Riding, Yorkshire celebrating Queen Victoria's Diamond Jubilee (1897)

The Elementary Education Act 1870 made five years the minimum age at which school boards could make education compulsory. Some people believed it was too young; but it was felt that young children could be taught moral lessons at an early age, were safer in school and children who started school sooner could be released to start work sooner. The Elementary Education Act 1880 made five years the start of compulsory education across England and Wales. Compared to others in the Western World, Britain's children had an unusually early start to mandatory education. Many children as young as two or three years were also enrolled at school. The proportion of children between three and five years at school increased throughout the remainder of the 19th century from 24.2% in 1870 to 43.1% in 1900. The relatively small number of children under three years in school increased in the early 1870s, but fell thereafter. The skilled working classes, whose wages were broadly going up throughout this period, made use of infant schools as childcare for their preschool children. Many poorer families sent their children to school before the age of five when fees were abolished at elementary schools in 1891. This largely brought about the end of dame schools. Some children who lived a long way from the nearest school were not sent until after the infant stage.

The rise of young children attending school was not seen in Scotland to the same extent as in England and Wales. The philanthropic infant school movement had faded in Scotland by the middle of the century. The 1861 and 1871 censuses found that Scottish children under the age of five were much less likely to be in school than their English or Welsh counterparts. The Education (Scotland) Act 1872 also introduced a start to compulsory education at five years old in Scotland. Only a minority of five-year-olds in Scotland were enrolled at school until around 1900. It appears that the Scottish school boards did not tend to enforce the school starting age. Both Scottish teachers and parents seemed to lack enthusiasm for infant education, seeing little value in lessons for younger children who were less able to respond to formal instruction.

=== Curriculum and facilities ===
The payment by results system of funding schools was introduced in 1862. Children under six were exempt from individual examinations and the exemption was expanded to children under seven a decade later. The system encouraged more emphasis on teaching the three r's (reading, writing and arithmetic) at the infant stage to prepare for examinations in later years. The focus of teaching in infant schools moved towards rote learning. In some schools, infants were given little attention by teachers as they did not receive grants for examination. An investigation into infant schools, conducted in 1870, found that they were typically broken into two classes. In the "babies class", for the under fives, children were taught "to speak clearly, to understand pictures, to recite the alphabet and to march to music". The "infants class" for the five-to-seven-year-olds taught "a curriculum based on the three Rs, simple manual tasks and sewing." Babies' classes were inadequate for the youngest children; often overcrowded, using pens to keep children in their seats and led by adolescent or unqualified teachers.

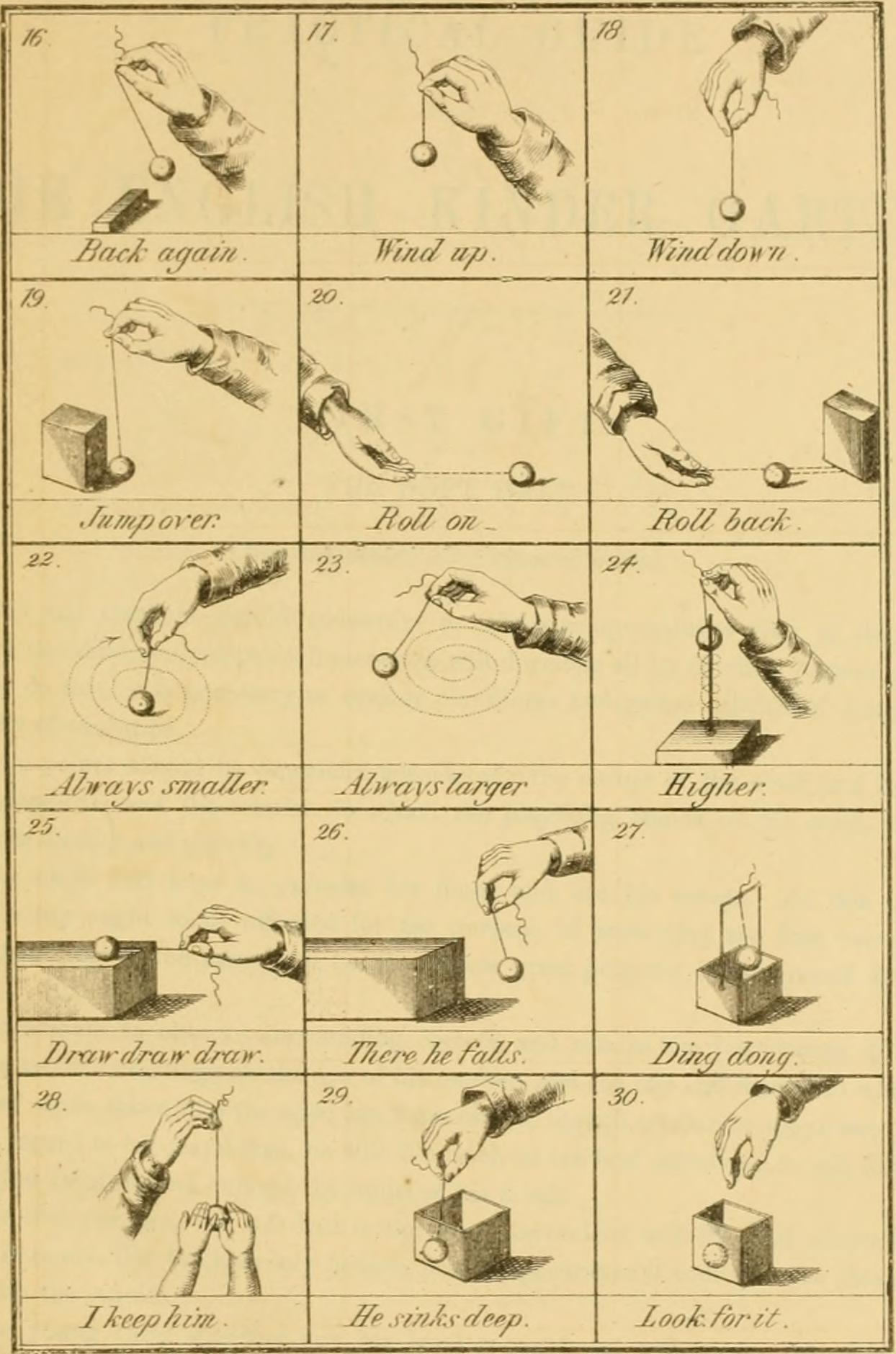
Guidance for how to use Froebel's first "gift"—a box of six coloured balls—appeared in A Practical Guide to the English Kinder-Garten (children's Garden) by Johannes Ronge (1858)

New infant schools were required to include a playground from 1871, fourteen years before a similar obligation was introduced for other new schools. Regulations also required separation between infant children and their older peers. Schools increasingly had a dedicated adult teacher for the infants. School boards frequently put specific expectations on infant schools. For instance, Bradford School Board's infant schools were instructed to emphasise singing lessons "and such physical exercises as are practised in infant school". Turner states that many infant schools reflecting the ideas of the early movement continued to exist. He argued that this sometimes created a "new humane and enjoyable approach to teaching" which was often supported by school inspectors. Although infant teaching was less established in Scotland, these kind of methods were also gradually introduced there, influenced by the situation in England. In Wales, where many children were learning English as a second language, Welsh was sometimes used extensively with infants and they were less likely to be punished for speaking it.

This was a period when the ideas of Frederick Froebel were being imported into Britain through "kindergartens" aimed at the middle classes. He had developed a number of "gifts" and "occupations" which were designed to improve young children's understanding of the physical world. Froebel put an emphasis on the value of play and felt that children should not be formally educated until they were motivated to learn. A mixture of practical considerations and class prejudice meant that his ideas were broadly considered unsuitable for infant schools. The government wanted to quickly establish basic literacy and numeracy among children who would leave school at an early age. Theories about what it meant to give children a broader education were not important to this goal. Froebel's ideas were hard to implement in large classes of children whose parents could usually give them little support at home. Whitbread comments that officials "were not concerned with the development of rational human beings but with ensuring a literate proletariat". However attempts were made to introduce some of Froebel's methods into infant schools, often turning them into whole-class activities that lost much of their original value.

Infant classes in the early 1900s were almost always separated from the older children in all but the smallest village schools. They were generally large with fifty or sixty children seated in rows. The culture of the payment-by-results system remained even though the system had formally ended. Instruction focused on the three R's taught, to a large extent, through rote learning. There was an emphasis on discipline and conformity across the curriculum. For instance, pupils were forced to write with their right hand, art lessons consisted of exactly copying an image provided by the teacher and physical education took the form of drills along with marching on occasion to martial music. Some schools were starting to take a more informal approach to teaching babies' classes for those under five—for instance, using moveable furniture and in a few of the more liberal-minded schools allowing periods of free play with toys—though, class instruction in the three R's was a major part of the teaching of even this youngest group.

== Shift to child-centred approach ==
=== Edwardian era ===
High levels of military recruit rejection on health grounds during the Second Boer War drew the government's attention to the poor living conditions experienced by much of the British population. The Inter-Departmental Committee on Physical Deterioration was established and released its report on public health in 1904. Witnesses spoken to by the inquiry believed that schools were damaging the health of children who were sent early by working mothers. Young pupils were reportedly being prevented from moving around and made to do tasks they were not yet developmentally ready for. Some witnesses said that nurseries rather than schools were needed for children between three and five years. Female school inspectors were asked to do a further report on children under the age of five attending school. This report, released in 1905, was very critical, commenting "that the children between the ages of three and five get practically no intellectual advantage from school instruction ... the evidence is very strong against attempts at formal instruction for any children under five". The report said that children from the poorest households gained a health benefit from being removed from the home, but that nurseries were preferable to schools.

From the government's point of view, there were a variety of economic and practical reasons for excluding children under five from school and new guidance issued to local education authorities in 1905 allowed them to do that. All children under three had been removed from infant school by 1904. The proportion of three-and-four-year-olds in England and Wales at school fell to 22.7% in 1910 and 13.1% in 1930. While there were some efforts to create nurseries aimed at the working classes, except for a brief expansion during the First World War to free up mothers to work in the ammunition factories, it would be some time before a significant number were created. Mothers often used childminders if school was not available.

The 1905 code for elementary schools encouraged infant schools and classes to move away from a focus on reaching a particular standard of attainment in the three R's. They would instead emphasise "the more general aim of encouraging mental and physical growth and of developing good habits". Lessons for five-to-seven-year-olds were to be a maximum of fifteen minutes long. Children of this age would be "trained to listen carefully, to speak clearly, to recite easy pieces, to reproduce simple stories and narratives, to do simple things with their hands, to begin to draw, to begin to read and write, to observe, to acquire an elementary knowledge of number".

A year later the ideas of John Dewey came to British attention after the publication of a collection of his essays. Dewey argued that lessons for young children should reflect the spirit of Froebel's ideas rather than using the specific "gifts" and "occupations" he had suggested. Dewey felt this meant using the kind of activities children were naturally interested in as a basis for teaching. A new attitude developed in infant education that was more open-minded about teaching methods and placed greater emphasis on child development. A senior school inspector Edmond Holmes wrote in 1911 that "the atmosphere of the good infant schools is ... freer, more recreative, and truly educative than that of the upper schools of equivalent merit". Welsh became the dominant language at infant schools or departments in Welsh-speaking areas of Wales during the early 20th century.

Ivan G. Grimshaw and Maude Morgan Thomas were two British-born immigrants to the United States who wrote children's books about their childhoods during this period. Both of the authors discussed their first years at school; Grimshaw noted "I was enrolled in the Infant School, which was the equivalent of the American kindergarten", while Morgan Thomas just used the American term "kindergarten". They both remarked on the age of starting school; Grimshaw commented "I was only three years of age ... as it was customary to begin the work very early", while Morgan Thomas mentioned, "Welsh children usually began school at a very early age, many of them as young as three years". They both described doing craftwork in lessons; "After folding circular pieces of paper many times, we puffed them out by blowing on them. A great many of these were fastened together to make bright-colored balls which we hung in our homes for decoration." and "we modeled in plasticine, making birds' nests and filling them with eggs, and rolling endless snakes." Morgan Thomas summarised that her early years at school were "very pleasant" and mentioned being rewarded for achievements. Grimshaw described his infant teacher warmly.

=== Interwar period ===
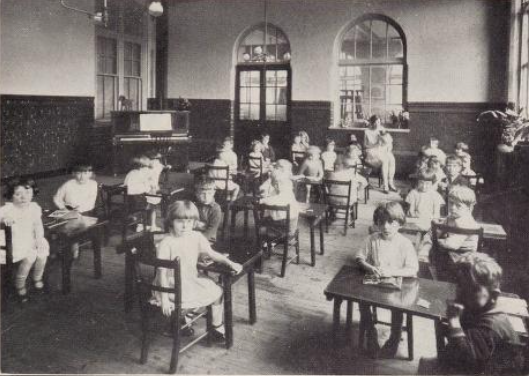
Image which appeared in the 1933 Hadow Report; labelled "A class in an Infant School with equipment of modern type".

Around the time of the First World War, a substantial reform movement grew out of various groups with grievances towards the education system. There was a general desire for social change and a belief had developed among some people that schools were a repressive part of an unnatural society. This led to the development of a new type of child-centred infant education in the interwar period. The new philosophy drew on various sources, including the work of Susan Isaacs and ideas from America or continental Europe. The main principle of this method was that activities were based on the preferences of the child. Good infant schools of this era used a variety of methods to encourage the children to expand their interests. For instance, pupils would be exposed to writing in the classroom to encourage a desire to learn to read. This was especially important to those from the poorest households who might have almost illiterate parents with no books. Subjects such as "nature study, pre-history, and craft-work" were introduced, based on the idea that children recreated humanity's intellectual development throughout history in their play. Subjects such as drama and music, along with speech and language activities, were also included. Project work played a major role in the teaching of older infants, especially. A class might also keep a pet.

There were flaws in the child centred system; some teachers failed to teach reading to poorer pupils who had no reason to develop an interest in the subject outside of school. Large classes in older schools were often ill-suited to the new methods, while new infant schools were more suitable but frequently inadequate. Child-centred practices were not universal and some schools used a significant amount of formal instruction in the older style. The Hadow reports of 1931 and 1933 broadly encouraged the child-centred approach. The second report recommended that children in the final year of infant school should receive some instruction in the three R's and younger children could begin learning to read when they were interested. However, it was felt the bulk of time should be spent on other activities. Infant schools had a positive reputation across the western world in the 1930s. While school inspectors generally supported the new ethos, there was some opposition. For instance, a political appointment in the Board of Education, Lord Eustace Percy later wrote in his memoirs: "Educational philosophy had become dangerously romantic since the [First World] war ... It aimed at civilizing children rather than instructing them".

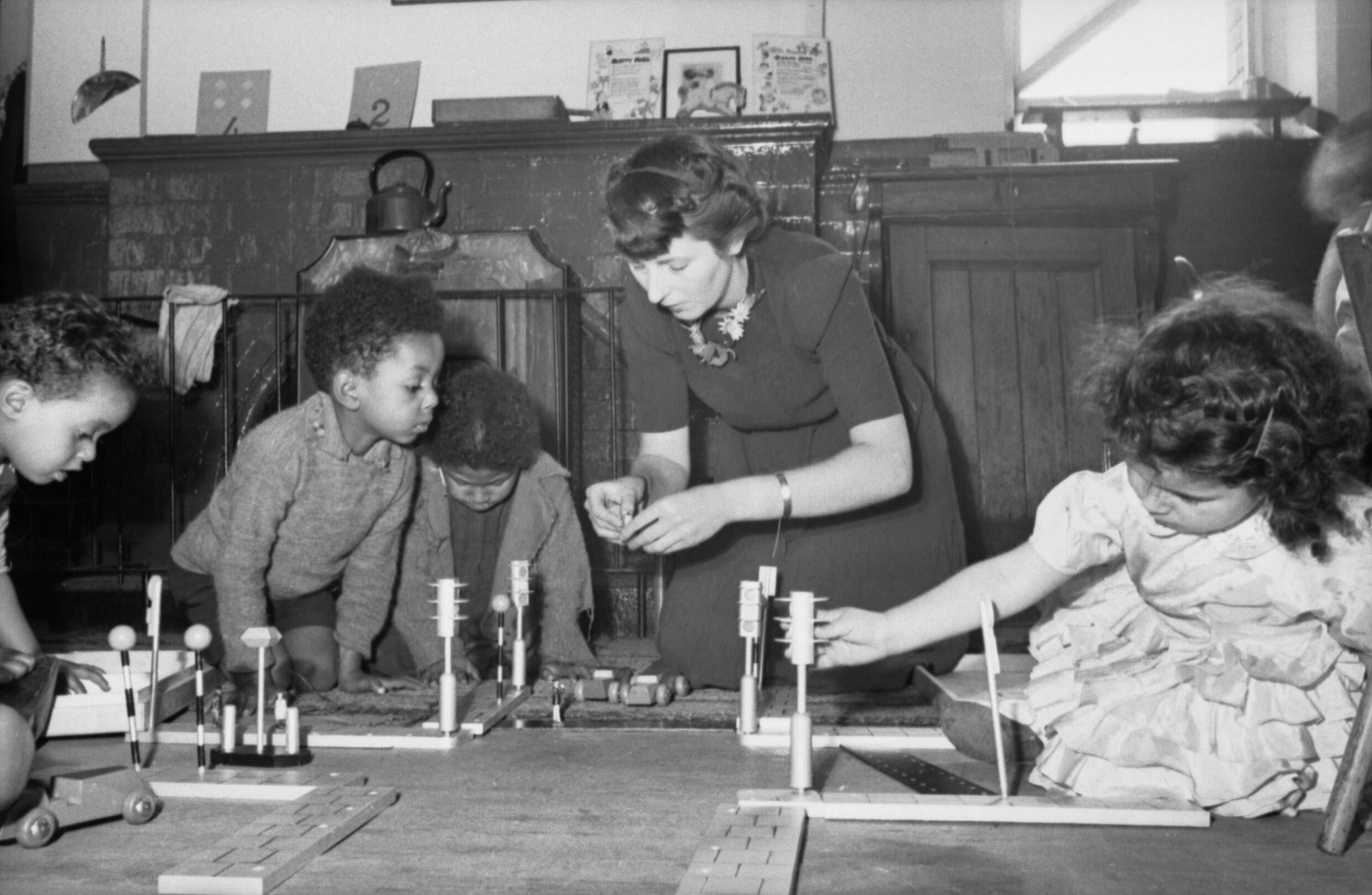
Infant-stage children learning about road safety at a school in Butetown, Cardiff (1943)

Meanwhile, in the 1930s, efforts to expand nursery provision were starting to have some effect. Several new nursery classes were added to infant schools and the proportion of three-and-four-year-olds at school increased marginally after multiple decades of decline. Nurseries tended to have an attached playground and beds for naptime. Children were encouraged to play educational games, physically exercise and become more self-reliant. The curriculum also included musical activities and listening to stories. During the Second World War, the government established multiple childcare schemes for preschool children. Education was a secondary aim of these schemes; they were intended primarily to free up mothers for war work and maintain children's health. Exposure to nursery methods encouraged infant schools in some areas to include more emphasis on play in their own teaching. Many middle-class mothers sent their children to infant schools or enrolled them in the childcare schemes for practical reasons during the war years, making middle-class children attending infant schools more socially acceptable.

== Part of primary education ==
=== Post-war era ===
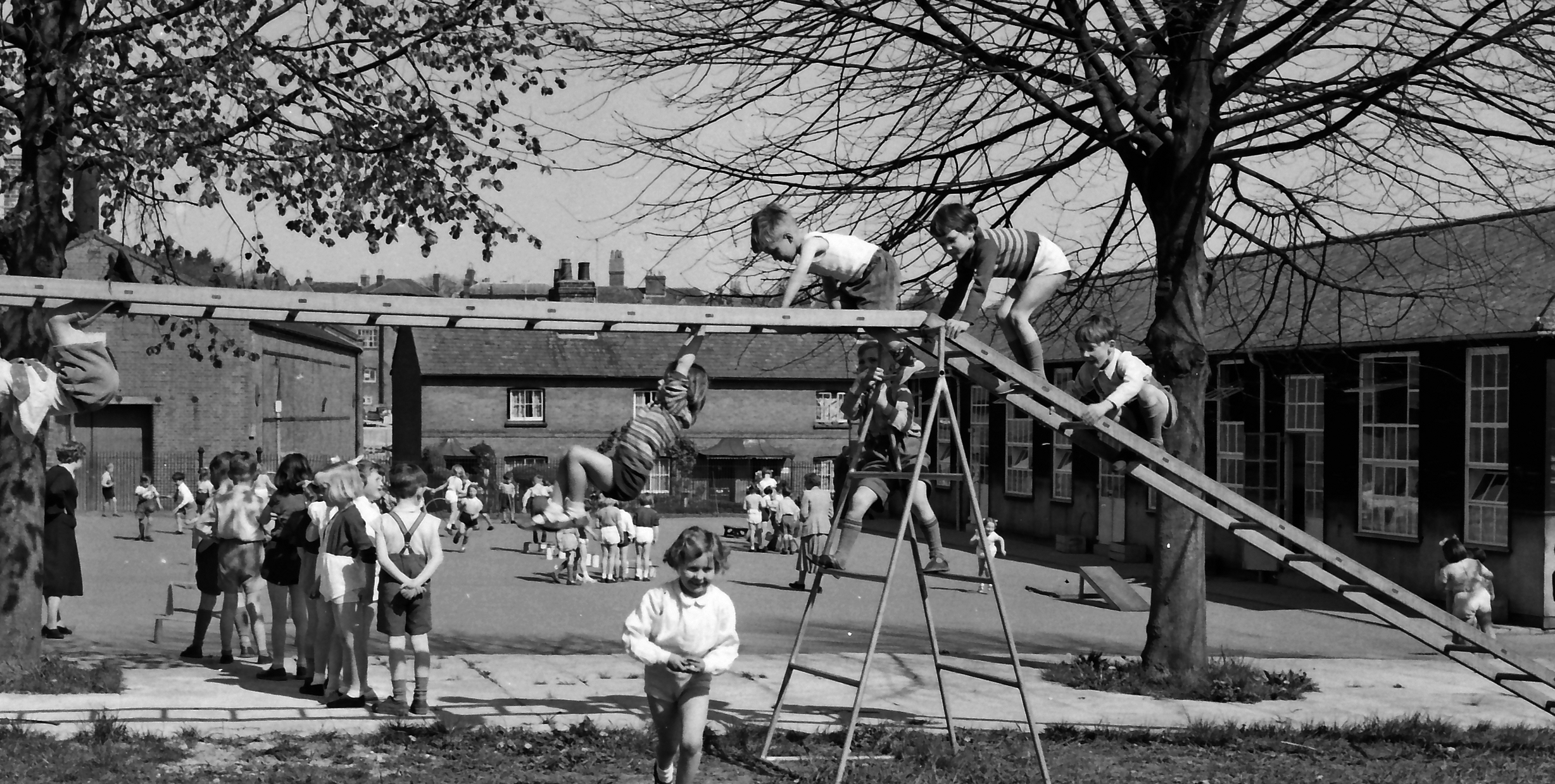
Playground at Henley Infant School (1957)

The Education Act 1944 placed the infant stage in primary education. Local education authorities often found it practical to build combined primary schools in new housing estates created by the post-war housing programme. The proportion of infant schools and departments that were separate schools fell from more than 70% before the Second World War to 56% in 1965. More middle-class parents sent their children to state schools, at least initially, than in pre-war times. The child-centred approach became increasingly dominant in infant schools, though more focus was placed on teaching the three R's. Studies had suggested that delayed teaching of reading could lead to a child's abilities in the subject being permanently stunted. The portion of three-and-four-year-olds at school declined during the post-war baby boom. The priority of the authorities was on catering to children of compulsory school age. Historians Gareth Elwyn Jones and Gordon Wynne Roderick give the following description of 1950s infant school teaching:

In the first year, the "reception class", children were usually occupied with activities similar to those in a nursery school, but were also taught to acquire the rudiments of reading and number, learned to draw and paint and to measure and weigh, while music, dance and movement also played an important part. Teaching methods with the older children varied: some teachers relied on formal instruction, others on informal individual and group activities.

In the interwar period, greater interest had developed in the effect the school environment had on children. The many new schools built in the period after the Second World War were designed to make pupils feel comfortable. An environment that was varied and appealing was seen as an important part of teaching a younger age group, and a reminiscence to a family home was felt to be especially important for infants. Furnishings were scaled down to be easily used by young children and a clear view of the outdoors was included in the design. Space was also set aside for physical activity, which was seen as important for teaching children how to cope with personal freedom. Building guidelines encouraged simple equipment in playgrounds, ideally made out of natural materials; for instance, "the youngest children will enjoy a simple bank to roll down, or a low wall to balance on". Interest in the physical environment of the school declined among educationalists by the early 1970s.

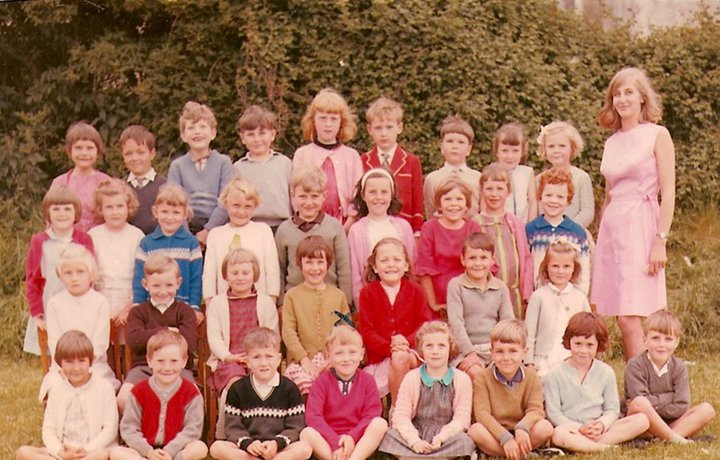
Class at Second Avenue Infants, Dovercourt (1967)

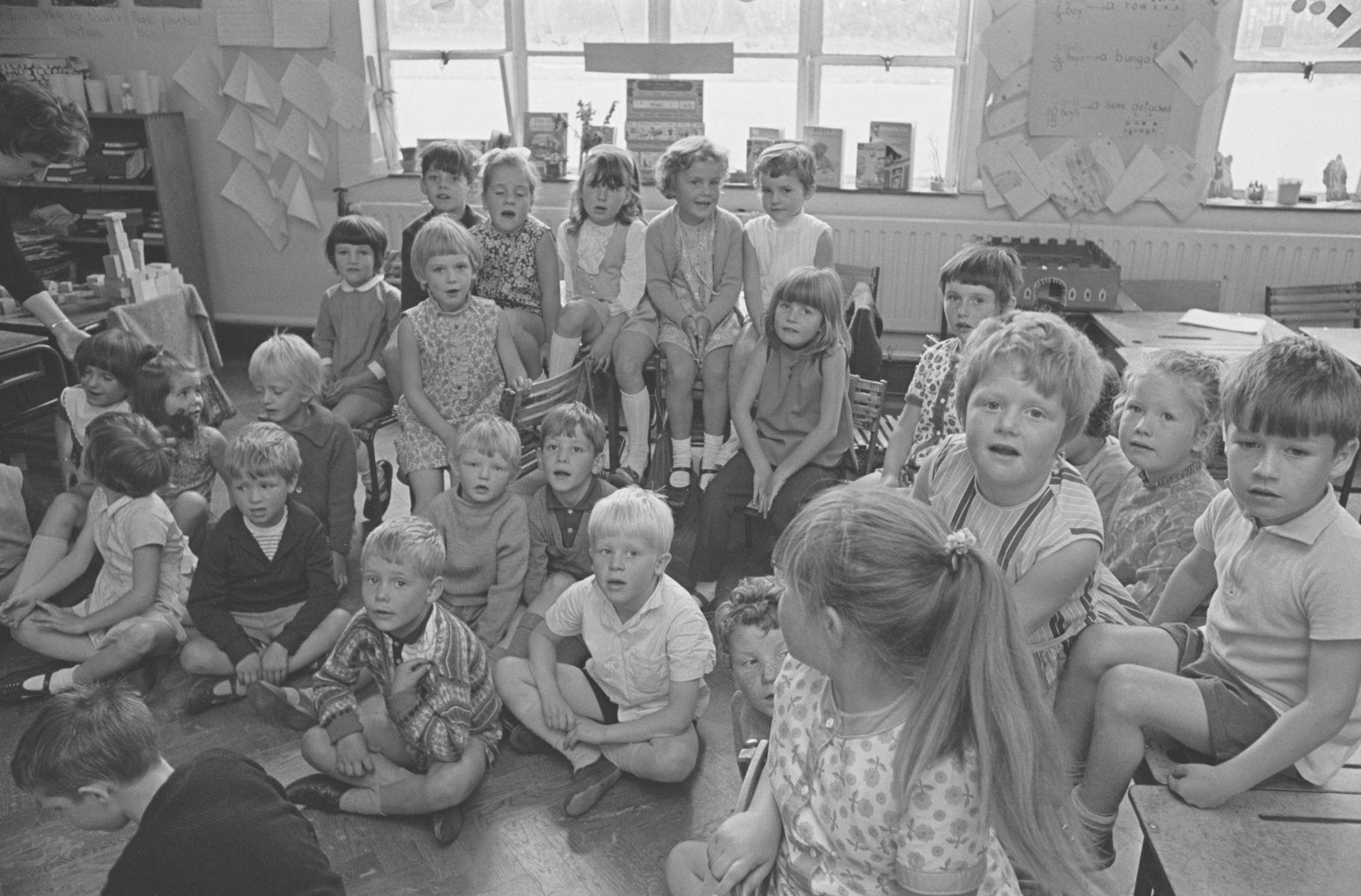
Infant class at Ysgol Gynradd Penmorfa (Penmorfa Primary school), Ceredigion (1970)

The Plowden Report in 1967 endorsed the child-centred approach and gave additional autonomy to teachers. Some infant schools responded to this by organising children into mixed-age classes and giving them much more autonomy over their choice of activities. In this type of system, a child had the same teacher throughout their time at infant school. The seven-year-olds would leave at the end of each school year and the almost five-year-olds would join at various points during the year. The classroom was divided into different areas where different skills were worked on; children could move between them when they liked. A few mandatory whole class activities also took place. A 1970 academic report argued that structuring teaching in this manner made lessons more effective and comfortable for both the children and the teacher.

A 1969 academic report commented that the first three years of primary school in Scotland, beginning at the age of five, were known as the infant department. These departments—described as "bright and happy places for learning"—were reportedly similar to their equivalents in England. Teachers said that children could usually read by the end of the first year. The report described Scottish primary schools as generally having more emphasis on formal instruction and discipline than their English counterparts but does not specify if this was true of infant departments.

=== Modern period ===
A backlash developed against the "progressive" method of teaching in the 1970s. While there is no evidence of concern among parents; sections of the political debate began to argue that schools were performing poorly academically and lacked discipline. The 1988 Education Reform Act introduced far more centralised control over state schools with a standardised curriculum and testing being introduced. The primary curriculum consisted of "three 'core subjects' (mathematics, English and science); six foundation subjects (history, geography, technology, music, art and physical education)". (Note: Welsh was also included in Wales; whether it was considered a core or foundation subject depended on how much it was used in the school.) Teachers of five-to-seven-year-olds were sceptical of these changes and remained close to previous child-centred practices. A 2004 study examined infant classes in England and compared them to the teaching of children of the same age in France. It found that the English schools tended to treat children in a more personalised way; giving them different work based on ability and considering how much effort a child had put into their work when marking it.

Children who had been less well prepared for school at home were given more time to play, in order to develop the skills they had been lacking. The English teachers rarely directly told children if there was a problem with their work, out of concern about their happiness. For instance, if a child had answered a mathematical problem incorrectly the teacher would vaguely allude to the issue ("I think you need to check this one") or emphasise the positives ("good try, actually it's less than that"). Creativity was emphasised in written work; spelling and grammar was considered less of a priority when children were first beginning to write. Children progressed from drawing pictures to writing only the sounds they recognised (Note: This practice was called "emergent writing". Children would sometimes draw lines to indicate that certain sounds were missing. For instance, a higher-ability four or five year old pupil wrote "The b– is in a b– h–as n in l– to go on a l–" to mean "The butterfly is in a butterfly house and likes to go on a leaf".) and eventually began to write unknown words phonetically. In 2006, a report by Jim Rose, Director of Ofsted, recommended synthetic phonics—an approach where children are taught to recognise the sounds represented by letters. This method quickly became the principal method of teaching reading to young children in England, to a greater extent than most of the English-speaking world.

During the mid-1990s, a voucher programme was introduced to allow parents of young children to receive state funding for childcare. Many schools had free space available due to falling birth rates and encouraged parents to use the vouchers to send their four-year-olds to school early. While the scheme was short-lived, it led to reception classes being established in many schools, though there was little clarity on what or how these classes were supposed to teach. In 2000, the Early Years Foundation Stage was introduced in England to set guidance for educating young children up to the age of five with an emphasis on play and informal learning, including in reception classes. Though some reception classes reportedly emphasised formal instruction in order to prepare children for Key Stage 1.

The creation of the National Assembly for Wales in 1999 began an era of greater divergence in education policy between Wales and England. A new curriculum, the Foundation Phase, was introduced in Wales for children of three to seven years from 2008 onwards. The curriculum was intended to have more emphasis on play and give children greater control over their lessons. In 2022, primary schools in Wales switched to a new curriculum that gave more autonomy to teachers. In 2024, ITV News published a report on the relatively poor reading abilities of Welsh children compared to other parts of the UK. It argued that this was linked to schools in Wales encouraging young children to use pictures to guess the meaning of unknown words as well as phonics.

In 2018, it was reported that about 10% of children in England attended separate infant schools or "first schools" (schools which take children up to eight or nine years). There were approximately 1,700 of these schools, 1,000 less than a decade earlier. An analysis suggested that children who attended these schools likely achieved a similar level of academic attainment to other children. At the same time, there were 28 separate infant schools in Wales. The final separate infant school in Scotland closed in July 2024.

== See also ==
- Education in the United Kingdom
- Spread of infant schools outside Britain and Ireland
- History of Infant schools in Ireland

== Bibliography ==
=== Websites, journals and news articles ===
- Burke, Catherine (4 May 2019). "Designing for "Touch", "Reach" and "Movement" in Postwar (1946–1972) English Primary and Infant School Environments". The Senses and Society. 14 (2): 207–220. doi:10.1080/17458927.2019.1619315. ISSN 1745-8927.
- Garland, Derek (2018). "Education in the UK: a History". education-uk.org.
- Hetzel, Donna C. (1970). "An Overview of British Infant Schools". Young Children. 25 (6): 336–339. ISSN 0044-0728. JSTOR 42643342.
- Lewis, Bethan (14 June 2022). "Wales schools: New lessons 'exciting but a challenge'". BBC News. Archived from the original on 13 June 2022.
- Lloyd, Amy (2007). "Education, Literacy and the Reading Public" (PDF). Gale Primary Sources. University of Cambridge. Archived (PDF) from the original on 5 November 2020.
- Middleton, Nigel (1970). "The Education Act of 1870 as the Start of the Modern Concept of the Child". British Journal of Educational Studies. 18 (2): 166–179. doi:10.2307/3120307. ISSN 0007-1005. JSTOR 3120307. Archived from the original on 11 June 2024.
- Ogletree, Earl (January 1969). "Scottish Schools: A Visit to Edinburgh". Peabody Journal of Education. 46 (4): 205–210. doi:10.1080/01619566909537622. ISSN 0161-956X.
- Raveaud, Maroussia (July 2004). "Assessment in French and English Infant Schools: Assessing the Work, the Child or the Culture?". Assessment in Education: Principles, Policy & Practice. 11 (2): 193–211. doi:10.1080/0969594042000259474. ISSN 0969-594X.
- Roberts A, A. F. B. (1972). "A New View of the Infant School Movement". British Journal of Educational Studies. 20 (2): 154–164. doi:10.2307/3120216. ISSN 0007-1005. JSTOR 3120216. Archived from the original on 24 April 2024.
- Roberts B, A. F. B. (4 November 1972). "Scotland and Infant Education in the Nineteenth Century". Scottish Educational Review. 4 (1): 39–45. doi:10.1163/29499682-00401007. ISSN 0141-9072.
- Sommerville, Stuart (1 July 2024). "West Lothian's last Infant School in Scotland 'Mothballed' as Summer Holidays begin". Edinburgh Live. Archived from the original on 23 August 2024.
- Taddeo, Megan (October 2018). "Children as Experts in Infant School Transitions" (PDF). University of Winchester. Archived (PDF) from the original on 6 September 2024.
- Thomson, Dave (28 March 2018). "Why do pupils who went to infant and first schools appear to underperform at Key Stage 4?". FFT Education Datalab. Archived from the original on 13 October 2024.
- Turner, D. A. (1970). "1870: The State and the Infant School System". British Journal of Educational Studies. 18 (2): 151–165. doi:10.2307/3120306. ISSN 0007-1005. JSTOR 3120306. Archived from the original on 10 June 2024.
- Wallace, Cathie; Macrory, Gee; Hollmann, Willem (9 April 2024). "Phonics isn't Working – for Children's Reading to Improve, they Need to Learn to Love Stories". The Conversation. Archived from the original on 7 October 2024.
- Williams, Rhys (25 September 2024). "Inside the Reading Crisis Leaving Thousands of Children in Wales Unable to Read". ITV News. Archived from the original on 5 October 2024.

=== Books and book chapters ===
- Corr, Helen (1990). People and Society in Scotland, II, 1830-1914, "An Exploration into Scottish Education". John Donald. pp. 291–298. ISBN 0-85976-211-4.
- Grimshaw, Ivan G. (1931). When I was a Boy in England (PDF). Lothrop, Lee And Shepard Co. OCLC 1419686625. Archived (PDF) from the original on 30 June 2024.
- Johnes, Martin (2024). Welsh Not: Elementary Education and the Anglicisation of Nineteenth-Century Wales (PDF). University of Wales Press. ISBN 9781837721818. Archived (PDF) from the original on 31 October 2024.
- Jones, Gareth Elwyn; Roderick, Gordon Wynne (2003). History of Education in Wales. University of Wales Press. ISBN 978-0-7083-1808-9.
- Keane, Ann; Egen, David; Grigg, Russell; Roy, James; Morgen, Alun; Norris, Barry; Williams, Sian Rhiannon (2022). Watchdogs or Visionaries? Perspectives on the History of the Education Inspectorate in Wales. University of Wales Press. ISBN 978-1786839404.
- May, Helen; Kaur, Baljit; Prochner, Larry (2014). Empire, Education, and Indigenous Childhoods: Nineteenth-Century Missionary Infant Schools in Three British Colonies. Taylor and Francis. ISBN 9781315579337.
- Morgan Thomas, Maude (1936). When I was a Girl in Wales (PDF). Lothrop, Lee And Shepard Co. OCLC 1158357337. Archived (PDF) from the original on 10 October 2024.
- Novo, Laura (2011). "Education, Elementary". In Mitchell, Sally (ed.). Victorian Britain An Encyclopedia. Routledge. pp. 241–255. ISBN 9780415669726.
- Salmon, David; Hindshaw, Winifred (1904). Infant Schools, their History and Theory. Longmans, Green, and Co. OCLC 579070055.
- Stephens, W.B (1998). Education in Britain, 1750–1914. Palgrave Macmillan. ISBN 978-0-333-60512-7.
- Whitbread, Nanette (1972). The Evolution of the Nursery-Infant School: A History of Infant Education in Britain, 1800-1970. Routledge. doi:10.4324/9780203706961. ISBN 978-1-135-03062-9.
