= Americas Accreditation Council =

Education accreditation organization

- Official logo
- Abbreviation: AAC
- Formation: 2017
- Type: NGO
- Purpose: Educational accreditation
- Headquarters: Curaçao (Curaçao)
- Location: International
- Region served: Global
- Members: 14 educational institutions in over 5 countries
- Key people: Dmitri Nersesyan (CEO); Ricky Madison (COO)
- Website: www.aac-global.org

The Americas Accreditation Council (AAC), (formerly the Accreditation Agency of Curaçao), is an accreditation and international quality assurance organization that conducts external academic reviews of higher education institutions and academic programs. AAC is listed in the WHED database of recognized higher education accreditors. The agency focuses on institutions operating in emerging, transnational, online and blended education contexts. AAC conducts accreditation reviews internationally and does not limit its activities to institutions within Curaçao.

== History ==
The AAC was founded as the Accreditation Agency of Curaçao in 2017 as an independent organization with the objective of providing external academic quality assurance for higher education institutions operating outside traditional national accreditation frameworks. Following its establishment, AAC developed its accreditation standards, governance structure, and review procedures. Due to regulatory alignment processes and the global disruption of higher education operations during the COVID-19 pandemic, AAC initiated active accreditation activities in 2023.

== Jurisdiction and Status ==
On May 16, 2022, Curaçao's Ministry of Education, Science, Culture, and Sport issued a national decree officially designating the AAC as the authorized body to handle institutional and programmatic accreditation for the country.

== Scope of accreditation ==
AAC conducts institutional and program-level accreditation reviews for higher education providers, including:

- Emerging and private universities
- Transnational education providers
- Online and blended-learning institutions
- Professional, applied, and doctoral-level programs
- Selected non-degree and micro-credential programs

Accreditation decisions are made through independent review and formal decision procedures based on peer evaluation reports.

== Accreditation methodology ==
AAC applies an outcomes-based accreditation methodology that evaluates institutional effectiveness, academic governance, learning outcomes, and continuous quality improvement processes. The methodology incorporates Environmental, Social, and Governance (ESG) principles and emphasizes evidence-based assessment rather than compliance-only evaluation. Accreditation reviews are conducted through structured self-evaluation, peer review, and formal decision procedures.

== Affiliations ==
AAC is affiliated with international quality assurance organizations, including:

- Member of the Council for Higher Education Accreditation International Quality Group (CHEA CIQG)
- Member of the International Network for Quality Assurance Agencies in Higher Education (INQAAHE)
- Associated with the European Association for Quality Assurance in Higher Education (ENQA)

These affiliations reflect AAC’s alignment with internationally recognized quality assurance principles.

== Recognition ==
The AAC is fully recognized as an institutional accreditor by Curaçao's Ministry of Education, Science, Culture, and Sport. The AAC accredits undergraduate and postgraduate higher education institutions.

== Leadership ==
The Americas Accreditation Council is governed by a leadership team. Dmitri Nersesyan serves as Chief Executive Officer, and Ricky Madison serves as Chief Operating Officer.

== See also ==
- Higher education accreditation
- International education
