= History of infant schools in Ireland =

Philanthropic infant schools were established in Dublin in the 1820s. They were integrated into the state education system after its establishment in 1831. A system of payment-by-results system was introduced following an inquiry at the end of the 1860s. The new "kindergarten" methods of teaching young children had some limited influence on the curriculum in the late 19th century. At the start of the 20th century, infant teaching in Ireland initially switched to a child-centred approach. Following Irish independence, a return was initially made to rote learning with the aim of reviving the Irish language in the Irish Free State, though this was reversed from 1948.

== 19th century ==
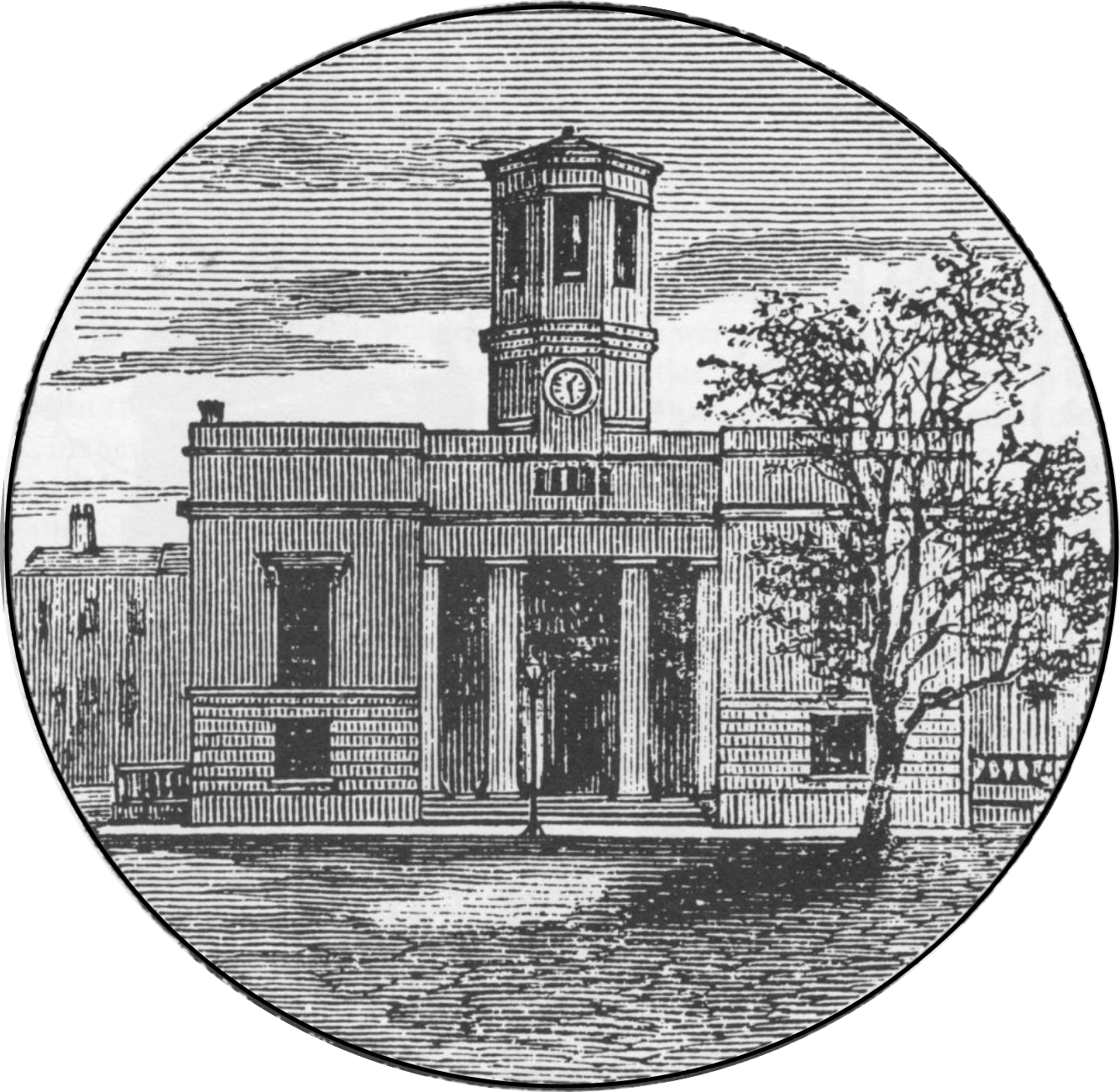
The Infant Model School, Dublin (1838)

An infant school society was established in 1820s Dublin; the organisation promoted infant schools to address social problems like its counterparts in Britain. The British government established a system of state-funded schooling in Ireland in 1831. This was an experiment as a similar system did not exist in England at the time; it was intended to assimilate Irish children into British society and reduce poverty in Ireland. The new "national schools" included infant classes. A number of infant schools were also established with the intention of serving as examples to others and providing training facilities for male student teachers. (Note: National schools were funded and used teaching materials provided by the National Board of Education. They were managed by other organisations, mainly the Catholic Church. The infant schools were part of a small group of example schools run directly by the Board.) There was ambiguity about what age range was covered by infant classes and schools; children were often admitted at two years.

The Teacher's Manual for Infant Schools and Preparatory Classes (1852) was written by Thomas Urry Young and drew heavily on Samuel Wilderspin's ideas about infant education. The manual was the first of its type to be published in Ireland and 30,000 copies were sold within a decade of its release. Maura O'Connor, an academic at St Patrick's College, argued that at a time when infant teachers in Ireland were largely untrained, the manual could be a significant source of guidance for them. The Powis Commission, an inquiry into schools in Ireland at the end of the 1860s, found that teaching in infant classes was generally poor. In response to this, a payment-by-results system was introduced with the intention of raising academic standards.

The age range of infant classes in Ireland was defined in 1884 as being three-to-seven-years-old. Schooling became compulsory for children over six in 1892, though attendance was much lower than in England. Attempts were made to introduce kindergarten methods into infant classes during the 1880s and 1890s. These methods were treated as a separate subject within an academically focused curriculum. It was seen as a form of physical training, preparing children for practical lessons in later years and eventually working life. Activities could be quite limited but accounts suggest that they were valued: for instance, Dr Bateman, a school inspector, wrote in 1896 that "the poor mothers of Limerick bless the man who invented the Kindergarten system". Inspectors continued to view infant teaching as quite poor.

== 20th century ==
The Revised Programme of Instruction in National Schools was introduced in Ireland in 1900. It was intended to be a more child-centred curriculum under which children would "find out things for themselves ... instead of being merely told about things". A wider curriculum would be taught in infant classes in a manner that would be informed by Friedrich Froebel's ideas. While the focus was still on the three r's, some of Froebel's "gifts" were included as well as "Drawing, Singing, School Discipline and Physical Drill, Cookery, Laundry Work and Needlework". There were various practical difficulties related to introducing the new curriculum, but inspectors felt that progress was made over time. Parents, teachers and others were sceptical of the changes, struggling to understand the new emphasis on physical activities. The curriculum was amended in 1904 and 1913. The 1913 version for infant classes was influenced by John Dewey's ideas. It prioritised socialising children in a homelike environment over teaching academic information, recommending that no formal instruction should be given before the age of six. The children would be given more autonomy and encouraged to pursue their interests. The following suggestions were given for how teaching might work:

Suppose, for example, Hans Andersen's 'Ugly Duckling' is the story of the week, the outcome of this tale would naturally be object lessons on the duck and the swan. The children could draw the duck's egg; with their bricks they could build the old woman's cottage, the table, chairs, fire-place, etc. In their geography lesson, with sand and clay, they could model the lake in which the swan lived. They could paper-fold a boat to sail on the lake – in fact by the exercise of a little thought on the part of the teacher, any gift or occupation [terms related to Froebel's theories] the children are taking can easily be connected with the story.

A dispute took place during the early 1900s related to the teaching of infant boys. It was widely believed at the time that female teachers were better equipped to teach young children and concern developed among officials that younger boys at boys schools were being neglected by male teachers. In 1905, boys schools were required to either employ a female assistant or stop admitting infants, unless it was impossible for these pupils to be accommodated elsewhere. This decision provoked a great deal of hostility from schools and the press: the popular perception was that this was an attempt by the British government to reduce costs by forcing a move towards mixed-sex education. The Catholic Church objected on moral grounds and male teachers feared a lower attendance in their schools would have a negative effect on their careers. A slight compromise was introduced in 1907 with the cut-off age being lowered from eight to seven. The employment of an assistant did allow more focus to be given to the teaching of infants.

A Gaelic revival movement developed in Ireland at the end of the 19th century. In the early 1900s, a partially Irish-language school curriculum was introduced in areas with a large number of Irish speakers. Following Irish independence from the United Kingdom, teaching in infant classes in the Irish Free State was made solely Irish-medium. The focus of instruction therefore shifted to introducing children to a language with which most of them were unfamiliar, largely using rote learning. Dr Timothy Corcoran was an academic who had great influence on this decision; he felt the main priority of the post-independence education system should be making Ireland an Irish-speaking country. Corcoran had a conservative view of education and disliked the child-centred method of teaching. He felt that early childhood was the best time to introduce a new language and formal instruction was the most effective way of teaching it. He tended to ignore research that did not support his theories.

The minimum age for starting school was raised to four years in 1934. An infant curriculum, that was similar to the child-centred approach attempted at the start of the 20th century, was introduced in 1948. Teachers were advised that effective education for infant classes "must be based on the young child's urge to play, to talk, to imitate, to manipulate materials, to make and do things." They were encouraged to use everyday occurrences—"when a child falls ... coughs, sneezes or cries"—and the activities in lessons to introduce Irish vocabulary. A small amount of teaching in English could also be included each day if the school wished. The obligatory Irish-medium system was unpopular with teachers and parents, and infant classes largely switched to English-medium when they were given the option in the 1960s.

New child-centred infant curricula were introduced in the Republic of Ireland in 1971 and 1999. The 1971 primary curriculum was designed to use more varied teaching methods, integrate subjects together and treat every child as an individual in order to allow "him [the child] to develop his natural powers at his own rate to his fullest capacity". There were some initial difficulties introducing the curriculum in schools that were ill-prepared. The 1999 curriculum was intended to be a progression on its predecessor. It lists the subjects that should be taught as "...Language: Gaeilge [Irish] and English; Mathematics; Social, environmental and scientific education (SESE): history, geography and science; Arts education: visual arts, music and drama; physical education; and Social, personal and health education (SPHE)." All the subjects are taught in infant classes, but the school day can be shorter.

In the Republic of Ireland today, the first two years of regular primary school are known as "junior infants" and "senior infants", and infant or junior primary schools take in the two infant class years and sometimes also the following year, "first class", or even the year after, "second class".

== See also ==
- Education in the Republic of Ireland
- Education in Northern Ireland
- History of education in Ireland

== Bibliography ==
- O'Connor, Maura (2011). The Development of Infant Education in Ireland, 1838–1948. Peter Lang. ISBN 978-3-0353-0025-3.
- Walsh, Thomas (April 2005). "Constructions of Childhood in Ireland in the Twentieth Century: A View from the Primary School Curriculum 1900–1999". Child Care in Practice. 11 (2): 253–269. doi:10.1080/13575270500053183. ISSN 1357-5279.
