= Spread of infant schools outside Britain and Ireland =

19th-century global childcare movement

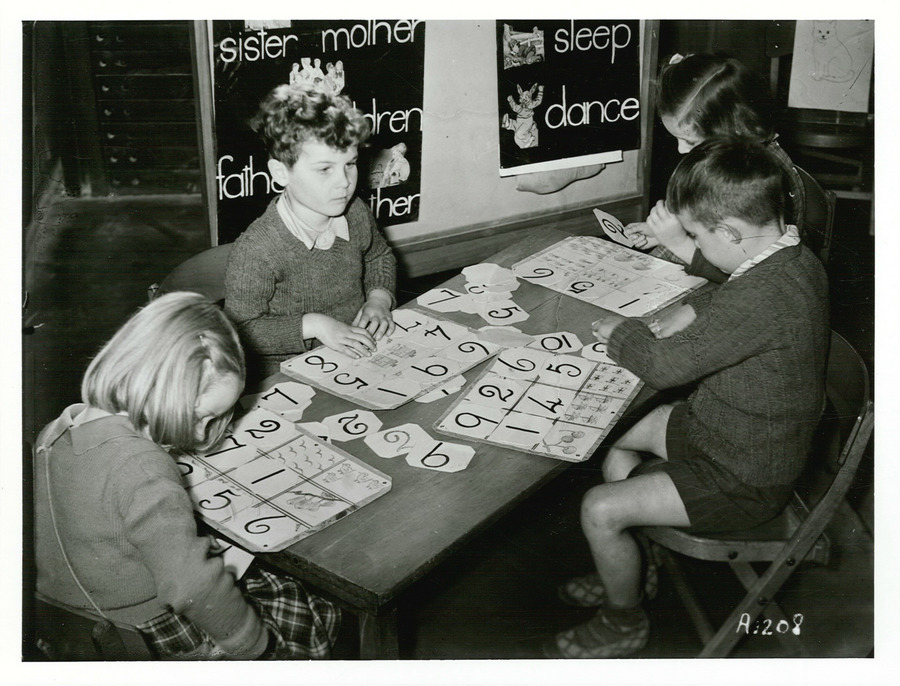
Infant-stage children solving puzzles at a school in New Zealand (c. 1900 – c. 1947)

The spread of infant schools outside Britain and Ireland took place in the 19th century. Infant schools and an associated method of teaching young children developed in the United Kingdom from 1816. The movement was influential globally over subsequent decades with schools being founded across Europe, the British empire and the United States. They appealed to contemporary concerns about social morality, access to education and spreading Christianity.

Infant schools were used by missionary groups in an effort to convert the empire's non-Christian subjects. They inspired the creation of Salles d'asile; a type of facility for young children developed in France from 1826. The movement also spread to the United States but quickly disappeared after a backlash against young children being educated outside the home.

== Background ==
An "infant school" is a term used in the United Kingdom, for the education of young children. The first infant school in Great Britain was established in 1816 for the children of mill workers in New Lanark, Lanarkshire in Scotland. It was followed by other philanthropic infant schools across Britain and Ireland. Early childhood education was a new concept at the time and seen as a potential solution to social problems related to industrialisation. A theory developed of how infant teaching should ideally be conducted — this included moral education, physical exercise and an authoritative but friendly teacher.

== Overview ==
Infant schools were quickly founded across Europe, the British Empire and the United States in the decades after the first establishments in Great Britain. In various countries, the number of infant schools expanded quickly for a period before enthusiasm declined and expansion slowed down. Historians have attributed the international appeal of infant schools to multiple factors; an ambition to expand Christian faith, greater interest in the development of young children, a desire to improve the moral character of society as a whole and the working classes especially. Infant schools were also a way of offering some education at a time when access to schooling was often limited. Johannes Westberg, an educationalist, gives the following overview of the influence of infant schools in Europe;

... [they spread] to France, present-day Belgium, and the Netherlands, and further to areas under Austrian rule, including Cremona (1828), present-day Budapest (1828), and Prague (1832). Infant schools were also spread throughout the German states; the Nordic countries, beginning in Copenhagen (1828), Stockholm (1832), and Trondheim (1837); and in Imperial Russia in Saint Petersburg (1839), Tallinn (1840), and Helsinki (1840).

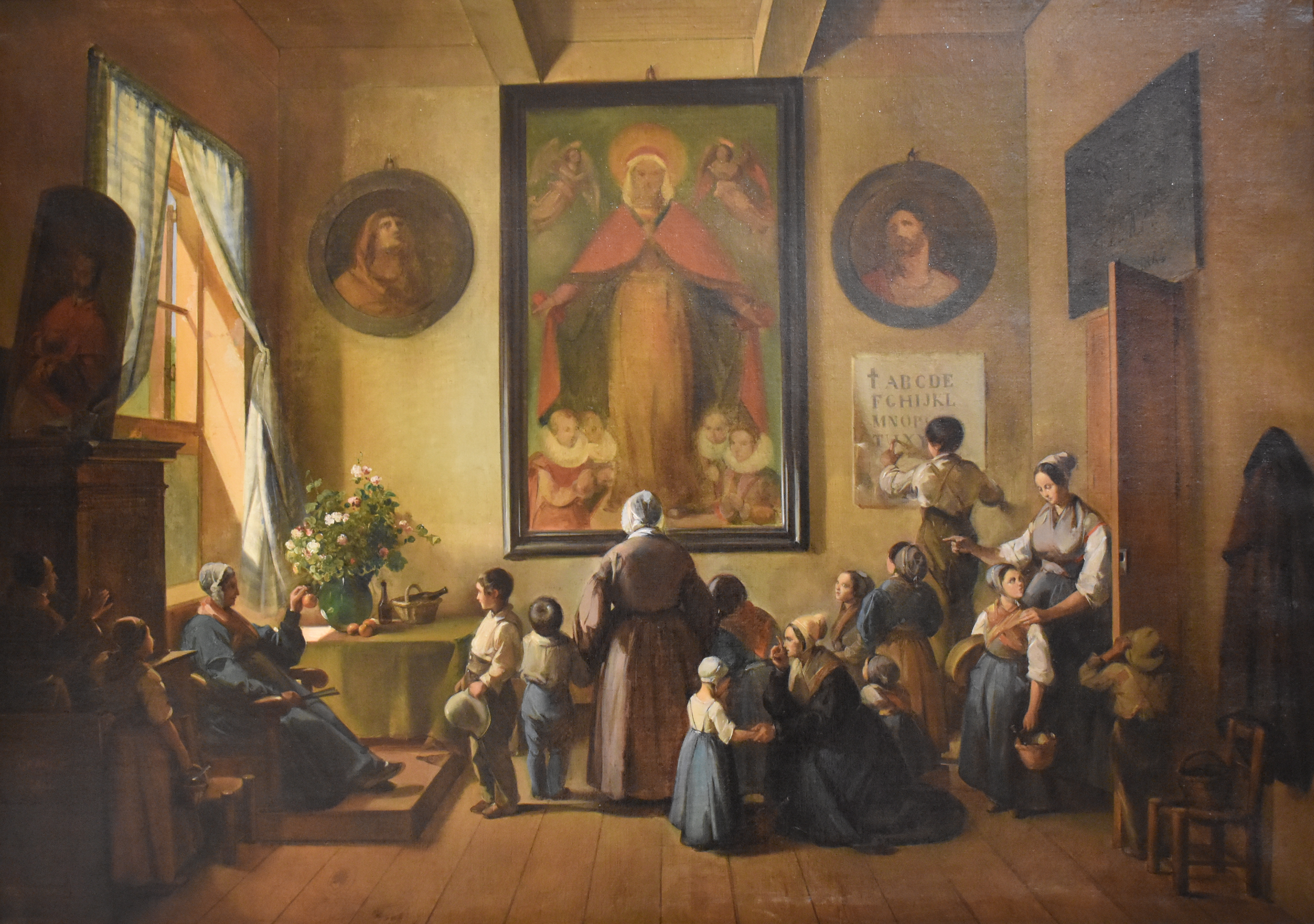
Intérieur d'une salle d'asile [Interior of an asylum room] by François Marius Granet (1844)

Salles d'asile (asylum rooms) were institutions for young children which were established in France beginning in 1826. They were inspired by and had similar motivations to infant schools; though greater importance was placed on religion. Overtime they were adopted into the state education system and renamed l'école maternelle (nursery school); remaining part of the French education system today. Colonial governments also imported British practices into their territories. For instance, in 1855, the government of Victoria, in modern Australia, wrote to the central education authority in England and Wales requesting two trained teachers to run a model example of an Infant School.

Some planation owners in the British West Indies established infant schools for enslaved children before they were put to work on the plantations. They hoped this would prepare children to be more effective workers in the future while they were too young to be useful. Plantation owners and colonial officials in the West Indies usually opposed missionary infant schools. They feared that schools of that kind would reduce the power of owners over the slaves. More plantation infant schools were established following the end of slavery in 1833; to encourage the freed workers to remain working there and spread Christianity among their children.

== United States ==
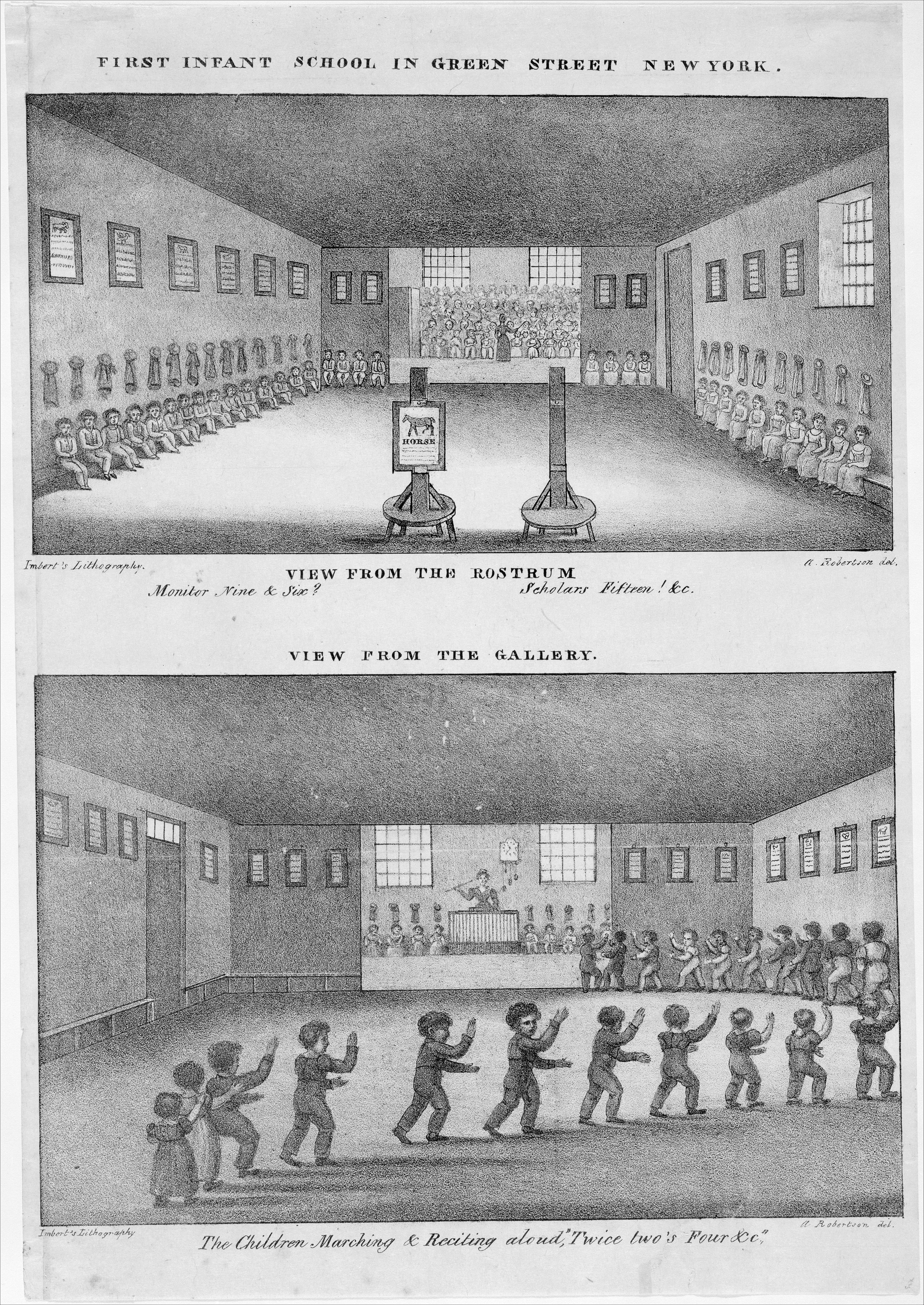
First Infant School in Green Street, New York, printed lithograph illustrations by Archibald Robertson and Anthony Imbert (1828)

The concept of infant schools entered American public debate in the mid-1820s. Professor John Griscom established a school with a class inspired by New Lanark Infant school in 1825, Robert Owen toured the United States from 1825 to 1826 and educationalist William Russell promoted the movement through the American Journal of Education established in 1826. American opinion was open to the idea; the United States was experiencing similar economic changes to Britain at a slower pace and a more sentimental view of childhood was beginning to develop. An Infant School Society was established in New York City in 1826 which was soon followed by societies in other American cities. Within a few years, infant schools had become common in urban areas. For example, the New York Infant Society was operating nine infant schools in 1831; two of which were for non-white children. Infant schools were established by a diverse range of groups and appealed to families of various economic backgrounds, though they were primarily for the poor. Some state governments gave public funding to them.

The first advice book about infant education published in the United States — Infant Education or Remarks on the Importance of Educating the Infant Poor from the Age of Eighteen Months to Seven Years — was released in 1827. It was heavily influenced by British texts on infant schools. No formal training was available for infant teachers in the United States, who were often inexperienced young women, so they tended to rely on books of this nature. Americans such as Ephraim Bacon and Bronson Alcott developed their own theories about infant education. Some infant schools emphasised play while others focused on academic study; parents often wanted their children to be strictly disciplined and taught how to read. Bacon wrote a short guide to infant education which was published in a collection of texts on the subject — the American version of Essay on Infant Cultivation by James Brown — in 1828. May, Kaur and Prochner describe the chapters it was organised into:

... (1) the Opening of the School with hymns and prayers; (2) Arithmetic utilizing a Numeral Frame, and Geography, taught with children in the gallery and the teacher using pasteboard shapes and figures; and (3) Natural History using pictures and an analytical system ('What is this? A cow'; 'Is the cow a useful animal?'; 'Yes, every part of the cow is useful'). The book ended with a list of 'Rules and Regulations' from Samuel Wilderspin and an extract from David Goyder's Treatise on the Management of Infant Schools on discipline... , along with a selection of Mrs. Gilbert's Hymns for Infant Schools.

Financial support for infant schools was declining by the middle of the 1830s. Competition for philanthropy from the developing public school system and personal disputes contributed to the infant schools decline. Academic Alan R. Pence argued that broader developments negatively affected infant schools. Economic changes meant that more women were able to stay at home as housewives rather than seeking employment. Mainstream opinion increasingly held that the best place for a young child was at home with their mother. In some places, infant schools were integrated into the public school system; shifting away from teaching the youngest children and losing their distinctive identity. By 1840, the infant school movement had ended in the United States. It had been common for young children to attend school — for instance 40% of three year olds in Massachusetts were in school in 1840 — but became much less usual in the years after. The American infant school movement was largely forgotten, rarely mentioned in literature from the middle decades of the 19th century. Writing in 1986, Pence argued that a worry that young children being cared for outside the home might undermine the family continued to be theme in American public debate throughout the 19th and 20th centuries.

== Missionary infant schools ==
A Protestant missionary movement developed in Britain from the 1790s. The movement emphasised the importance of educating children in order to spread Christianity — a text published by the Church Missionary Society in 1799 noted that "The instruction of children facilitates access to their parents, secures their friendship and conveys information to them through unsuspected channels. The minds of children are more susceptible and less under the influence of habit and prejudice than those of their parent." Missionaries saw similarities between the working-class people in the United Kingdom which the domestic infant school movement was attempting to reform and the "heathen", indigenous people around the British Empire. Infant schools were seen as a way to make missionary activity more effective by influencing children at earlier ages. According to historians Helen May, Baljit Kaur and Larry Prochner, the intention of these schools, like their counterparts in Britain, was to provide an "ordered and industrious environment set apart from the perceived disorder of the child's home environment". It was hoped this would introduce indigenous children "to Christianity and European modes of civilization". Evidence of missionary infant schools of this nature exists in various parts of the world.

=== India ===
The first infant school in the British-controlled territories of India was established in Calcutta in 1830. The school was founded and personally funded by John Mathias Turner, the Bishop of Calcutta. It closed soon after his death in 1831. Daniel Wilson, Turner's replacement, organised the establishment of the Calcutta Infant School Society in 1833. Accounts of infant schools were usually positive, but little detailed information exists. They appear to have been relatively common in the middle of the 19th century. Missionaries and colonial officials often believed that Indians would be reluctant to send their children to these schools. In fact, they were often quite well-attended, with parents seeing them as prestigious and considering it advantageous for their children to learn English. They were often bilingual, teaching English through the local language.

The missionary infant schools were not, as far as is known, sex-segregated but boys were more likely to attend than girls. The children who attended were often from quite well-off backgrounds but there were exceptions. The movement to establish infant education was closely linked to the movement to establish female education and many of the pupils who attended girls missionary schools grew up to work as infant teachers. The missionaries lobbied the British authorities in India to support infant schools. There was some apathy and scepticism but the government agreed to endorse a privately endowed boys' infant school in 1839. By the mid-1840s, infant classes attached to schools for older children were beginning to appear. In 1854, the British authorities established a state funded education system in India which did not formally include infant education. Missionary infant schools continued to exist, used largely by Europeans, Christian Indians and mixed-race Indians.

=== Māori children in New Zealand ===
The first missionary infant school in New Zealand was established in 1832. Many Māori people were interested in Christianity, literacy and western technology. Various positive accounts of infant schools exist and Māori children were often described as keen to learn. Infant schools became common in missionary settlements within a few years. Unlike schools for older children, they were often attended by both Māori children and the children of missionaries. Infant schools were conducted in the Māori language. Māori women taught in them and the first missionary infant school was founded in part to educate the women who helped to run it. Overtime, this would be a source of apathy among Māori parents who wanted their children to be taught English. One account of a later missionary infant school suggests children were being taught in both languages.

The missionary infant schools in New Zealand were influenced by the same figures as the early infant school movement in Britain. One unusually detailed account of an infant school timetable suggested they were teaching a similar curriculum to their British counterparts. A source of tension between Māori people and missionaries was that this curriculum — focused on good behaviour and basic academic skills — was different from the abilities Māori children needed to participate in the community of their birth. It was also uncertain if a western education would allow Māori people to be accepted into settler society. Missionaries saw Māori children as badly-behaved and undisciplined in comparison to their own. In general, Māori people do not appear to have used corporal punishment on their children. Infant schooling was seen as a way of instilling better behaviour into Māori children. There were sometimes tensions between what the two groups viewed as suitable child discipline.

By the 1840s, missionaries seemed to be becoming more negative about the infant schools. The latest known record of a missionary infant school in New Zealand dates from 1851. The 1867 Native Schools Act established a system of state-funded, English-medium schools in Māori villages following the New Zealand Land Wars. The authorities in New Zealand argued that this would "make education part of the Runanga [Rūnanga, meeting place] of the marae [meeting house]... scattering the seed [of European ideas] instead of confining it to a few hot-beds". These schools included non-compulsory infant classes for five to seven year olds.

=== Aboriginal children in Upper Canada ===
Infant methods were introduced into missionary schools near the Bay of Quinte in Upper Canada by Methodists from the United States. This group established temporary missionary settlements with the aim of completely surrounding converts with a new way of life, education was considered important for reinforcing this. Betsey Stockton, an American teacher, travelled to the Grape Island missionary settlement in 1829 and introduced infant school methods into the school. These methods were therefore influenced by the American Infant school movement. They were also later introduced into schools in other missionary settlements.

Younger children were not separated from older children in the Grape Island school, though "ABC's and spelling" was listed as a subject taught specifically to the "smaller ones". Instead infant methods were used for teaching children and young people of all ages for part of the day. The infant system, with its emphasis on images, was considered useful for teaching Aboriginal children who did not speak English as their first language. Missionary schools appear to have been teaching in a mixture of English and the children's native language. An account of a later missionary school indicated instruction was being conducted almost exclusively in English. The infant system's quick effect on younger children was considered useful as children were usually not expected to remain at school for long. The Methodist missionary schools where infant methods were adopted were short-lived but many of the boys who had studied in them grew up to establish their own missionary schools. An emphasis on the needs of younger children was not repeated in education programmes for Aboriginal children in Canada — with the exception of experiments using the kindergarten method in the 1890s — until towards the end of the 20th century.

== Bibliography ==
- Bischof, Christopher (2019). Teaching Britain: Elementary Teachers and the State of the Everyday, 1846–1906. Oxford University Press. ISBN 978-0-19-883335-2.
- Burger, Kaspar (2014-03-18). "Entanglement and Transnational Transfer in the History of Infant Schools in Great Britain and salles d'asile in France, 1816–1881". History of Education. 43 (3): 304–333. doi:10.1080/0046760x.2014.888486. ISSN 0046-760X.
- May, Helen; Kaur, Baljit; Prochner, Larry (2014). Empire, Education, and Indigenous Childhoods: Nineteenth-Century Missionary Infant Schools in Three British Colonies. Taylor and Francis. ISBN 9781315579337.
- O'Connor, Maura (2011). The Development of Infant Education in Ireland, 1838–1948. Peter Lang. ISBN 978-3-0353-0025-3.
- Pence, Alan R. (1986). "Infant Schools in North America, 1825 — 1840". In Kilmer, Sally (ed.). Advances in Early Education and Day Care : a Research Annual, Volume 4. Greenwich, Conn. : JAI Press. ISBN 978-0-89232-454-5.
- Salmon, David; Hindshaw, Winifred (1904). Infant Schools, their History and Theory. Longmans, Green, and Co.
- Westberg, Johannes (2020-08-24). "The Transnational Dissemination of the Infant School to the Periphery of Europe: the Role of Primary Schools, Religion, Travels, and Handbooks in the Case of Nineteenth-Century Sweden". Paedagogica Historica. 58 (1): 99–119. doi:10.1080/00309230.2020.1803936. hdl:11370/f2918382-a15f-484c-b7c9-ae43df717a60. ISSN 0030-9230.
- Vinovskis, Maris A. (1993). "Early Childhood Education: Then and Now". Daedalus. 122 (1): 151–176. ISSN 0011-5266. JSTOR 20027154.
- Whitbread, Nanette (1972). The Evolution of the Nursery-Infant School: A History of Infant Education in Britain, 1800-1970. Routledge. doi:10.4324/9780203706961. ISBN 978-1-135-03062-9.
