= International education =

Dynamic discipline across borders

International education refers to a dynamic concept that involves a journey or movement of people, minds, or ideas across political and cultural frontiers. It is facilitated by the globalization phenomenon, which increasingly erases the constraints of geography on economic, social, and cultural arrangements. The concept involves a broad range of learning, for example, formal education and informal learning (e.g. training, exchange programs, and cross-cultural communication). It could also involve a reorientation of academic outlook such as the pursuit of "worldmindedness" as a goal so that a school or its academic focus is considered international. For example, the National Association of State Universities prescribes the adoption of "proper education" that reflects the full range of international, social, political, cultural, and economic dialogue. International educators are responsible for "designing, managing, and facilitating programs and activities that help participants to appropriately, effectively, and ethically engage in interactions with culturally diverse people and ideas."

== Background ==
The emergence of international education as a discipline may be attributed to the international and intercontinental initiatives of the past, which aimed to achieve education, learning, and intellectual exchange. This is demonstrated in the formalized academic relations between countries in the form of bilateral and scientific agreements. Here, international education is considered a mechanism of international cooperation and, in some cases, it stems from the recognition that different cultures offer different outlooks and styles of learning and teaching in addition to the transfer of knowledge.

There are scholars who associate the development of international education with comparative education, which is concerned with the evaluation and scrutiny of different educational systems in various countries for the purpose of developing an education and educational structures that are global in scope and application. This concept is considered ancient, having been used in classical Greece, while the actual term was first used by William Russell in 1826. International education diverged from it as it assumed the form of more organized programs that bring together learners and teachers from different countries to learn from each other.

== Definitions ==
International education can be seen as developing 'international-mindedness', or enhancing international attitude and awareness. From an ideological perspective, international education has a focus on moral development, by influencing the creation of "positive attitudes towards peace, international understanding and responsible world citizenship".

From a pragmatic approach, international education can relate to economic and cultural globalization. For instance, there are increasing demands for education qualifications to be transferable between schools and education systems. Furthermore, there is a "spread of global quality standards through quality assurances procedures such as accreditation".

Overall, international education can be viewed as the following:

- Promoting international understanding/international-mindedness and/or global awareness/understanding
- Being active in global engagement/global or world citizenship
- Increasing intercultural understanding and respect for difference
- Encouraging tolerance and commitment to peace

Direct examples of international education include facilitating students' entry into universities outside of their home countries. Also, temporarily studying abroad is another illustration of international education, as is the internationally influenced research and design of curriculum used by schools around the world, such as the International Primary Curriculum.

The International Baccalaureate (IB) Program is seen as an influence in the development of international education. The IB Diploma Programme encourages students to learn and understand different cultures, languages, and points of view. This idea is incorporated into elements of the program e.g. Creativity, Activity, Service (CAS). CAS requires students to participate in activities promoting each of these three components. Through such activities, the intention is that global issues will affect students' understanding of the world in a meaningful way. Specifically, these non-formal, non-academic experiences should enhance students' comprehension of world issues in a manner that, for instance, reading books or participating in lessons may not.

Based on student engagement and involvement, two general meanings emerge. The first refers to education that transcends national borders through the exchange of people. A good example would be students traveling to study at an international branch campus, as part of a study abroad program or as part of a student exchange program. The second is a comprehensive approach to education that intentionally prepares students to be active and engaged participants in an interconnected world.

The International Baccalaureate however, defines the term according to certain criteria. These criteria include the development of citizens of the world in accordance with culture, language, and social cohesion, building a sense of identity and cultural awareness, encrypting recognition and development of universal human values, encouraging discovery and enjoyment of learning, equipping students with collectivist or individualistic skills and knowledge that can be applied broadly, fostering global thinking when responding to local situations, encouraging diversity and flexibility in teaching pedagogic methodologies, and supplying appropriate forms of assessment and international benchmarking.

While definitions vary, international education is generally taken to include:

- Knowledge of other world regions & cultures;
- Familiarity with international and global issues;
- Skills in working effectively within global or cross-cultural environments and using information from different sources around the world;
- Ability to communicate in multiple languages; and
- Dispositions towards respect and concern for other cultures and peoples.

== Millennium Development Goals ==
One of the eight millennium development goals ratified in the United Nations in the year 2000, focuses on achieving universal primary education. International education is also a major part of international development. Professionals and students wishing to be a part of international education development are able to learn through organizations and university and college programs. Organizations around the world use education as a means to development. Previous research demonstrates a positive correlation between the educational level and economic growth, especially in the poorest regions. The United Nations Millennium Development Goals include some objectives pertaining to education:

- Achieve universal primary education in all countries by 2015
- Eliminate gender disparity in primary and secondary education by 2015

Other mentions of education in regard to international development: Education For All (EFA): An international strategy to operationalise the Dakar Framework for Action; The World Education Forum (Dakar 2000) agreed to reach 6 goals by 2015:

- expand early childhood care and education
- improve access to complete, free schooling of good quality for all primary school-age children
- greatly increase learning opportunities for youth and adults
- improve adult literacy rates by 50%
- eliminate gender disparities in schooling
- improve all aspects of education quality.

== Sustainable Development Goals ==
At the end of 2015, the United Nations led another initiative to continue on the work of development goals. The Sustainable Development Goals (SDGs) contains 17 global goals, which are more extensive than the Millennium Development Goals (MDGs). Compared to the 2015 MDGs, the SDGs tries to ensure that no one is left behind. In this regard, not only state actors, but also major private "non-state" actors and multinational companies are involved and active in global education.

Education is stated under Goal 4 of the SDGs: "Ensure inclusive and equitable quality education and promote lifelong learning opportunities for all." Furthermore, SDGs promote international education through some of the following targets:

- "By 2030, ensure that all learners acquire the knowledge and skills needed to promote sustainable development, including, among others, through education for sustainable development and sustainable lifestyles, human rights, gender equality, promotion of a culture and non-violence, global citizenship and appreciation of cultural diversity, and of culture's contribution to sustainable development" (Target 4.7)
- "By 2020, substantially expand globally the number of scholarships available to developing countries, in particular least developed countries, small island developing States and African countries, for enrollment in higher education, including vocational training and information and communications technology, technical, engineering, and scientific programs, in developed countries and other developing countries" (Target 4.B)
- "Volume of official development assistance flows for scholarships by sector and type of study" (Indicator 4.B.1)
- "By 2030, substantially increase the supply of qualified teachers, including through international cooperation for teacher training in developing countries, especially least developed countries and small island developing States" (Target 4.C)
- "Proportion of teachers in: (a) pre-primary; (b) primary; (c) lower secondary; and (d) upper secondary education who have received at least the minimum organized teacher training (e.g. pedagogical training) pre-service or in-service required for teaching at the relevant level in a given country" (Indicator 4.C.1)

According to a report from the U.N. Secretary-General on "Progress towards the Sustainable Development Goals" in 2018, official development assistance (ODA) for scholarships amounted to $1.2 billion in 2016. The largest contributors were Australia, France, the United Kingdom of Great Britain, Northern Ireland, and European Union. Education is a core aspect of the SDGs, and considered essential to their success. Hence, an international strategy has been established through the Incheon Declaration and Framework for Action. This strategy emphasizes mobilizing national, regional, and global efforts and collaborations that aim at:

1. "Achieving effective and inclusive partnership"
2. "Improving education policies and the way they work together"
3. "Ensuring highly equitable, inclusive, and quality education systems for all"
4. "Mobilizing resources for adequate financing for education"
5. "Ensuring monitoring, follow-up and review of all targets"

== Dakar Framework for Action ==
The UN Decade of Education for Sustainable Development (DESD) (2005–2014) highlighted the central role of education in the pursuit of sustainable development internationally.

== Collaborative Online International Learning (COIL) ==
Although successful programs such as Engineers Without Borders enable students in one country to obtain an international education while working on open source appropriate technology projects abroad, the cost of this approach can be prohibitive for large scale replication. Recent, work has shown that using a virtual educational exchange, can have many of the positive benefits associated with international education and cross cultural experiences, without the prohibitive costs of overseas programs.

== International Education Week ==
International Education Week is an initiative of the U.S. Department of State and U.S. Department of Education that was first observed in 2000. The choice of week for celebration is determined at each institution, but generally it is the week containing the third Thursday of November (17–21 November 2025; 16–20 November 2026; 15–19 November 2027; 13–17 November 2028), which is the week that immediately precedes the week that includes U.S. Thanksgiving. The aims of this event are to provide an opportunity to celebrate the benefits of international education and global exchange. This joint initiative promotes programs that prepare Americans for a global milieu and attract future leaders from abroad to study, learn and exchange experiences in the U.S. This shows how International education is not just about physically crossing borders, but is also about thinking globally in local situations. Schools throughout the US celebrate this week through on-campus and off-campus events.

== Challenges facing international education ==
International education has a somewhat unusual position in higher education. While recognized as an important sphere of activity, it tends to be handled by administrative offices at the top of departments of languages and literature and international affairs. The scholars involved in international education usually have their primary involvement in other teaching and research. This leads to four distinctive characteristics particular to the field of international education:

1. There is little consensus concerning the guiding theme of the field as well as its scope. Should the field stress internationalization, trans nationalization, or globalization?
2. International education is not a prominent feature of the contemporary higher education experience. Using enrollment in foreign languages as an indicator, 16 percent of all U.S. college students were enrolled in foreign languages in the peak period of the 1960s; the proportion is currently down to 8 percent (Hayward, 2000, p. 6).
3. There is imbalance in regional coverage. The regions and languages covered at a particular institution are a function of idiosyncratic patterns of faculty recruitment. Nationally, there is reasonable coverage of Western Europe and Latin America and most European languages compared to limited coverage of Africa and the Middle East. For students enrolled in foreign languages, Spanish is the most popular followed by the other major languages of Western Europe; 6 percent enroll in Asian languages. Languages of the Middle East make up only 2 percent (1.3 being Hebrew and .5 percent Arabic). The languages of Africa constitute only 0.15 percent of enrollments.
4. Because international education is not a primary concern of most scholars in the field, research is somewhat sporadic, non-cumulative, and tends to be carried out by national organizations as part of advocacy projects (e.g. Lambert, 1989; Brecht and Rivers, 2000). The most recent example is the American Council of Education's (ACE's) Internationalization of Higher Education: A Status Report. (Hayward, 2000). However, programs through various institutions, such as the Fulbright Program offer research opportunities for those wishing to study abroad.

Additionally, one of the challenges of international students is that increasingly higher education institutions are treating them as cash cows for meeting their budget challenges. Institutions must do more to support international students in their academic and career success by providing advising, training and coaching that is culturally attuned.

== See also ==
- Global education
- Global citizenship education
- International student
