= Infant school =

Type of school for young children

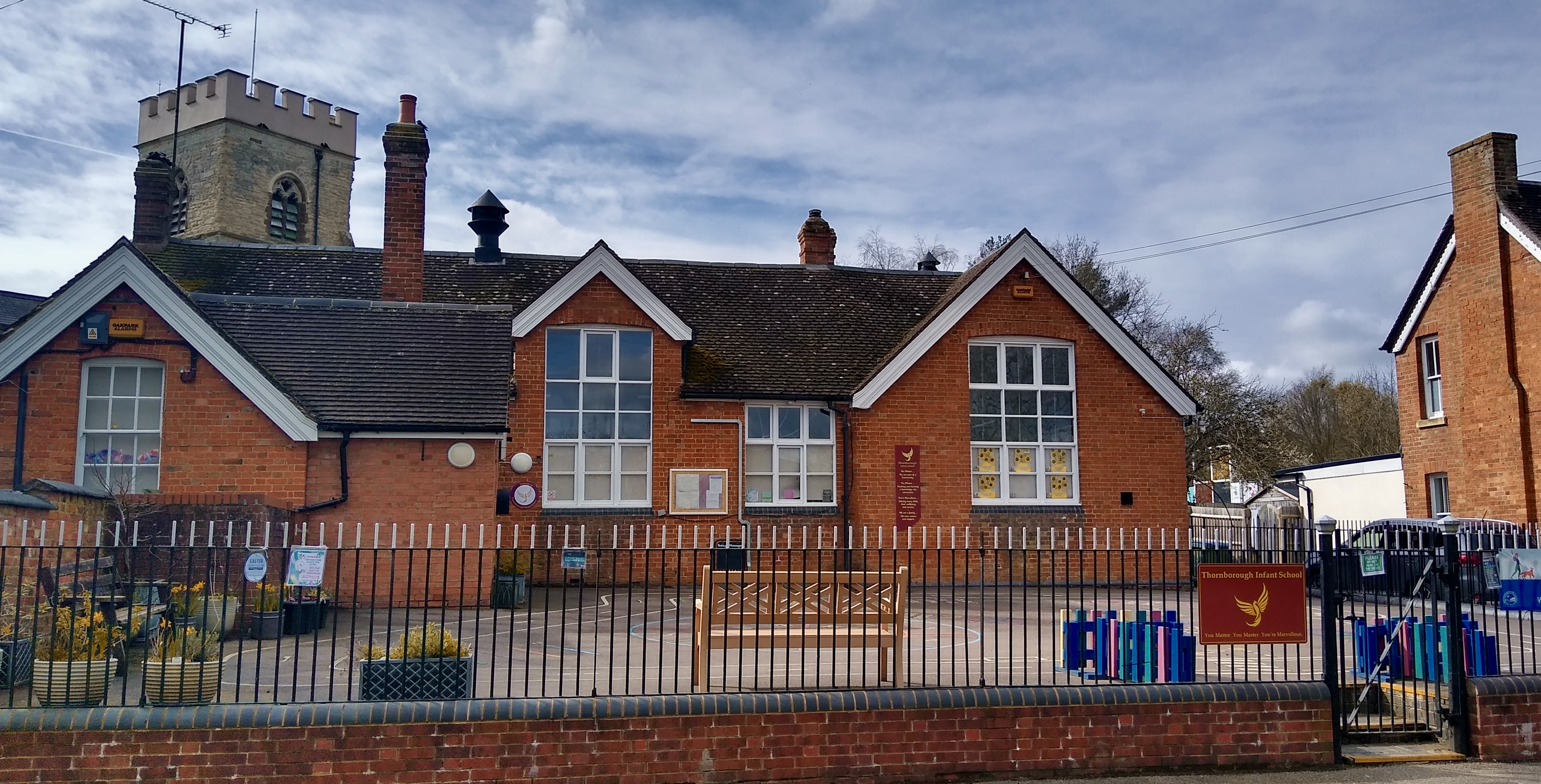
Thornborough Infant School in 2024

An infant school is a type of school or school department for young children. Today, the term is mainly used in England and Wales. In the Republic of Ireland, the first two years of primary school are called infant classes. Infant schools were established in the United Kingdom from 1816 and spread internationally. They were integrated into the state school system in the mid-19th century. The teaching methods they use have evolved over time. Dictionaries tend to define the age ranges they cater to as between four and eight years old: this corresponds to the Reception year and Years 1–3 in the school system on England and Wales. 10% of children of the relevant age in England attended a separate infant school in 2018. In England, children below the age of five are taught in a manner more focused on play and those above that age have a more academically focused curriculum.

== History ==
The first infant school was founded in New Lanark, Scotland, in 1816. It was followed by other philanthropic infant schools across the United Kingdom. Early childhood education was a new concept at the time, and seen as a potential solution to social problems related to industrialisation. Numerous writers published works on the subject and developed a theory of infant teaching. This included moral education, physical exercise and an authoritative but friendly teacher. The movement quickly spread across the British Empire, Europe and the United States. It was used by missionary groups in an effort to convert the empire's non-Christian subjects.

In England and Wales, infant schools served to maximise the education children could receive before they left school to start work. They were valued by parents as a form of childcare. State-funded schools were advised in 1840 to include infant departments within their grounds. A similar process took place in Ireland after the establishment of a state education system there in 1831. As it was integrated into the state system, infant education in England, Ireland and Wales came under pressure to achieve quick academic progress in children, and shifted towards rote learning. The new "kindergarten" methods of teaching young children had some limited influence on the curriculum in the late 19th century.

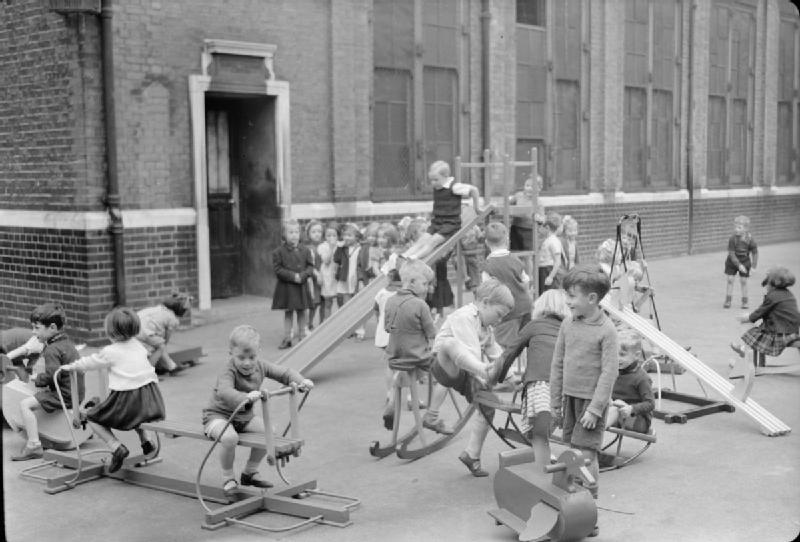
Playground at an infant school in North London (1943)

Beginning in 1905, infant education in England and Wales shifted towards more child-centred methods of teaching, where education was meant to reflect the preferences of children. Many of the youngest children – the under fives, who were considered ill-suited to school – were removed entirely, though some nursery classes were later attached to infant schools to cater to this age group. The child-centred approach reached its peak following a report in 1967. In 1988, a more centralised curriculum was introduced, but there have been moves away from this in Wales since devolution. Infant teaching in Ireland initially moved in a similar child-centred direction. Following Irish independence, initially a return was made to rote learning, with the aim of reviving the Irish language, though this was reversed from 1948.

== Definition and scale ==
The term infant school is used in the United Kingdom. It may refer to a separate school, or a department within a larger school. Dictionaries give various age ranges for this phase of education. Cambridge describes infant schools as "for children who are four to seven years old". Collins defines them as "for children between the ages of five and seven". Merriam-Webster uses the age range from "five to seven or eight". Oxford does not give a lower age limit, just stating "usually under seven years of age". A UK government document published in 2013 described "infant (5 to 7 or 8)" as the middle phase of primary education in England and Wales but commented that "in Scotland and Northern Ireland there is generally no distinction between infant and junior schools."

In the Republic of Ireland, the first two years of regular primary school are known as "junior infants" and "senior infants", and infant or junior-primary schools take in the two infant class years and sometimes also the following year ("first class") or even the year subsequent to that ("second class").

In 2018, it was reported that about 10% of children in England attended separate infant schools or "first schools" (schools which take children up to eight or nine years old). There were approximately 1,700 of these schools, 1,000 less than a decade earlier. An analysis suggested that children who attended these schools likely achieved a similar level of academic attainment to other children. At the same time, there were 28 separate infant schools in Wales. The final separate infant school in Scotland closed in July 2024.

== Curriculum and debates ==
The first year at school, attended by four and five year olds, is called Reception in England and integrated into preschool education. The following two years, covering five to seven year olds, are known as Key Stage 1. In Wales, the levels of attainment expected of school children are called progression steps. The first of these is expected to be reached at approximately five years and the second at around eight years. The first year of primary school in Scotland is part of Early Level that also includes nursery education. The next three years are called First Level. (Note: For a summary of age groups in Scottish schools, see:Education in Scotland#Stages of compulsory education)

The question of when children should transition from learning in a manner based on play to more formal instruction is a matter debated among academics. Some studies suggest that an early start can have benefits, but many suggest it has a neutral or negative effect in the long term. In England, the shift takes place when children move from the Early Years Foundation Phase to Key Stage 1 at five years. Beyond that age, government policy encourages a focus on formal instruction in reading, writing and mathematics. In many countries the change takes place when children are slightly older, though the divide is frequently blurred. The foundation phase was introduced in Wales in 2008 to move towards more informal learning for children up to seven years, in reaction to these debates.

In the 2020s, there have been concerns that many children are starting school with limited ability to communicate and manage their personal care. Some experts have linked these issues to the cost of living crisis and the COVID-19 pandemic.

== Bibliography ==
- Clarke, Vanessa (31 August 2024). "Pandemic Babies Starting School Now: 'We Need Speech Therapists Five Days a Week'". BBC News.
- Garland, Derek (2018). "Education in the UK: a History". education-uk.org.
- Lewis, Bethan (14 June 2022). "Wales schools: New lessons 'exciting but a challenge'". BBC News. Archived from the original on 13 June 2022.
- May, Helen; Kaur, Baljit; Prochner, Larry (2014). Empire, Education, and Indigenous Childhoods: Nineteenth-Century Missionary Infant Schools in Three British Colonies. Taylor and Francis. ISBN 9781315579337.
- O'Connor, Maura (2011). The Development of Infant Education in Ireland, 1838–1948. Peter Lang. ISBN 978-3-0353-0025-3.
- Salmon, David; Hindshaw, Winifred (1904). Infant Schools, their History and Theory. Longmans, Green, and Co.
- Sommerville, Stuart (1 July 2024). "West Lothian's last Infant School in Scotland 'Mothballed' as Summer Holidays begin". Edinburgh Live.
- Taddeo, Megan (October 2018). "Children as Experts in Infant School Transitions" (PDF). University of Winchester.
- Thomson, Dave (28 March 2018). "Why do pupils who went to infant and first schools appear to underperform at Key Stage 4?". FFT Education Datalab.
- Turner, D. A. (1970). "1870: The State and the Infant School System". British Journal of Educational Studies. 18 (2): 151–165. doi:10.2307/3120306. ISSN 0007-1005. JSTOR 3120306.
- Westberg, Johannes (24 August 2020). "The Transnational Dissemination of the Infant School to the Periphery of Europe: the Role of Primary Schools, Religion, Travels, and Handbooks in the Case of Nineteenth-Century Sweden". Paedagogica Historica. 58 (1): 99–119. doi:10.1080/00309230.2020.1803936. hdl:11370/f2918382-a15f-484c-b7c9-ae43df717a60. ISSN 0030-9230.
- Whitbread, Nanette (1972). The Evolution of the Nursery-Infant School: A History of Infant Education in Britain, 1800-1970. Routledge. doi:10.4324/9780203706961. ISBN 978-1-135-03062-9.
