= William Russell (educator) =

Educator and elocutionist (born 1798)

William Russell (born Glasgow, Scotland, 28 April 1798; died Lancaster, Massachusetts, 17 May 1873) was an educator and elocutionist. He was formally educated in the Latin school and in the university of Glasgow; and, he came to the US in 1819, wherein that year, he took charge of Chatham Academy in Savannah, Georgia. He moved to New Haven, Connecticut, a few years later, and there he taught in the New Township Academy and also in the Hopkins Grammar School. He then devoted himself to the instruction of classes in elocution in Andover, Harvard, and Boston, Massachusetts. He edited the American Journal of Education 1826–1829. In 1830, he taught in a girls' school in Germantown, Pennsylvania, for a time with Bronson Alcott. He resumed his elocution classes in Boston and Andover in 1838, and he lectured extensively in New England and in New York State. He established a teachers' institute in New Hampshire in 1849, which he then moved to Lancaster, Massachusetts, in 1853. His subsequent life was devoted to lecturing, for the most part, before the Massachusetts teachers' institutes, under the guidance and instruction of the state board of education.

== Works ==
- Grammar of Composition (New Haven, 1823)
- Lessons in Enunciation (Boston, 1830)
- Rudiments of Gesture (1838)
- American Elocutionist (1844)
- Orthophony, or Cultivation of the Voice (1845)
- Elements of Musical Articulation (1845)
- Pulpit Elocution (Andover, 1846)
- Exercises in Words (1856)

He also edited numerous school books and several minor educational manuals.

== Family ==
His son, Francis Thayer Russell (born Roxbury, Massachusetts, 10 June 1828; died Waterbury, Connecticut, 20 July 1889), was a clergyman and educator. He was educated at Phillips Academy in Andover, Massachusetts, graduated through the theological department of Trinity College in 1854, and then he became an ordained priest in 1855. Then he became pastor of a succession of several different Protestant Episcopal churches in New Britain, Ridgefield, and Waterbury, Connecticut; and, then he was professor of elocution at Hobart, Trinity, the Berkeley Divinity School, and also at the General Theological Seminary, in New York City. After 1875, he was rector of St. Margaret's Diocesan School for Girls in Waterbury. Frank Russell had a reputation as being an elocutionist, and he held professorships in two theological seminaries. He published Juvenile Speaker (New York, 1846), Practical Reader (1853); and, he edited a revised edition of his father's work under the title of Vocal Culture (1882), and he was also the author of Use of the Voice (1882). He was a childhood friend of Louisa May Alcott.

== Bibliography ==
- Wilson, J. G.; Fiske, J., eds. (1900). "Russell, William (elocutionist)" . Appletons' Cyclopædia of American Biography. New York: D. Appleton.
- John Matteson, Eden's Outcasts: The Story of Louisa May Alcott and Her Father, New York: W. W. Norton, 2007. ISBN 978-0-393-05964-9
- Harriet Reisen, Louisa May Alcott: The Woman Behind Little Women, New York: Henry Holt and Co., 2009. ISBN 978-0-8050-8299-9
- James Shepard, History of St. Mark's Church, New Britain, Conn., and of its predecessor, New Britain, CT, 1907, pp. 449–452.
- Joseph Anderson, Sarah Johnson Prichard, Anna Lydia Ward, The town and city of Waterbury, Connecticut, 1896, v. 2, pp. 524–525.
