= Le Grelle family =

Family of imperial, Dutch, Papal and Belgian nobility

Le Grelle
- Noble family
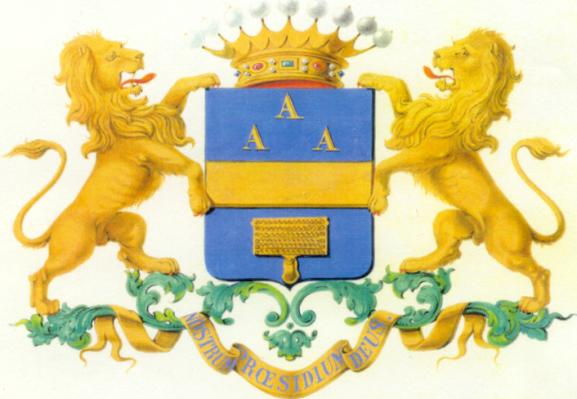
- Coat of Arms. Two golden lions armed and langued Gules.
- Founded: 16th century
- Titles: Member of the National Congress, Member of the Belgian House of Representatives, Mayor of Antwerp, Mayor of Pulle (Antwerp), Mayor of Berlaar; Senator, Alderman of Antwerp, Communal councilor, Grand Chaplain of Antwerp, Secret chamberlain of the Pope, Dignitaries of the Austrian Netherlands, Clerk of the city of Antwerp, Clerk of the Antwerp Chamber of Treasurers, Commissioner of currencies, Attorney General.
- Motto: Nostrum Praesidium Deus
- Crown of count. François Le Grelle (1671–1729) married Catherine de Schepper, the last descendant of the oldest branch of an old family of aldermen in Mechelen since the 16th century. It is from this family that the Le Grelle family will take its coat of arms.

The Le Grelle family is a family of imperial, Dutch, Papal, and Belgian nobility.

== Origins ==
The Le Grelle lineage began with Jean in 1586 in Mainvault, near Ath.

=== The Le Grelle's in International Trade in the 17th and 18th centuries ===
In 1670, Guillaume Le Grelle (1646–1724), a native of Ath (Hainault), the great-grandson of Jean, was received as a bourgeois in the city of Antwerp. His son François, a textile merchant, is the common ancestor of the noble branches.

The two eldest sons of François Le Grelle, Guillaume-François and Jean-François, took their first successful steps in the field of international trade in the early 18th century. Following the closure of the Scheldt (Escaut) River and the port of Antwerp since the end of the 17th century, some private shipowners obtained patent letters stating the authorization to fit out armed vessels bound for India in 1714. On December 19, 1722, the emperor Charles VI granted the establishment of a Company of the Indies, Ostend Company, in Ostend. At the time, Ostend was a fishing center of commercial importance, and a deeper and sheltered port was built there at the beginning of the 17th century.

==== Guillaume-François Le Grelle (1701–1771) and Jean-François Le Grelle (1703–1759) ====
The two brothers founded a trading company in Ostend. From 1730 to 1750, they imported textiles, silk, sugar, cocoa, tea, and porcelain from England, Portugal and China in collaboration with the Swedish East India Company. At that time the Le Grelle's were also part of the shareholders of the Ostend and Trieste Companies. From 1754, Guillaume-François and Jean François became industrialists (sugar and paper factories). In 1732, their trading company had its headquarters in their house "De Grooten Gulden Schilt" on the High Street (Hoogstraat) in Antwerp. Jean-François Le Grelle was also a judge and lived in the castle of Morckhoven.

==== Jean-Guillaume Le Grelle (1733–1812) ====
Jean-Guillaume, the eldest son of Guillaume-François, had sugar factories and a cotton printing press, which employed 576 workers in 1770. His company had obtained exclusivity for the Austrian Netherlands. In 1807, he acquired the castle of Selsaeten in Wommelgem. By succession, the castle was passed on to the family Agie de Selsaeten.

==== Gérard Le Grelle (1713–1771) ====
The last grandson of François, Gerard Le Grelle began trading in silk around 1740. After his death in 1771, his widow, Catherine Oliva (1724–1791), continued the trade. In 1756, the sugar refinery Huysmans & Cie or De Belle was founded. The shareholders of these companies included François J. Moretus.

==== Gérard-François Le Grelle (1747–1800) ====
Gérard-François, the son of Gérard and alderman of Antwerp, was appointed deputy in 1785 for the Austrian East India Company. The family acquired several castles in the Antwerp region. These included, in addition to the castle of Selsaeten in Wommelgem, Rameyen, Gestel, Morckhoven, Middelheim, Berchem, Doggenhout, Munsterbilzen, Boterberg, Wuustwezel, as well as many mansions in the Meir or rue Longue-Hôpital.

=== The Le Grelle's in Banking ===
In the early 18th century, the Le Grelle family founded a bank with the children and grandchildren of Gérard Le Grelle and Catherine Oliva distinguishing themselves in this activity during the tumultuous periods at the end of the 18th century.

==== Joseph J. Le Grelle (1764–1822) ====
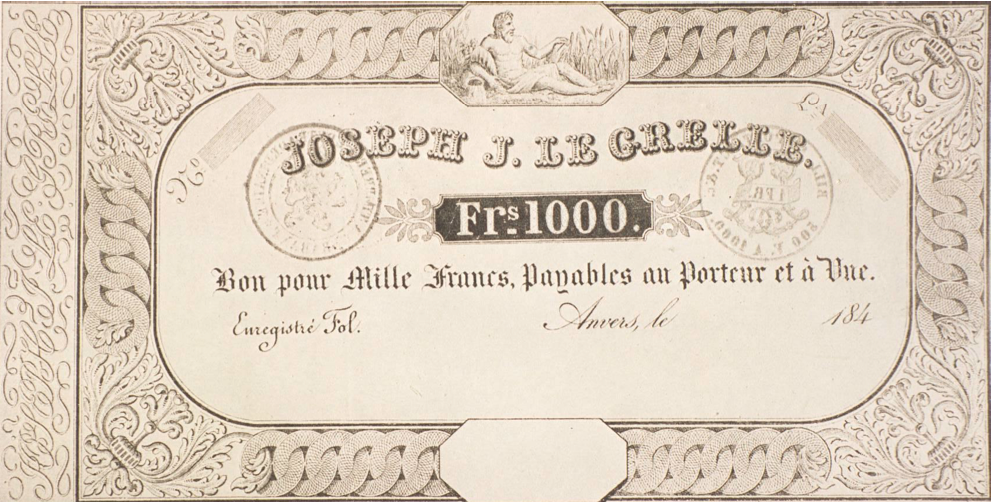
Bill of 1000 Belgian francs issued by the Joseph J. Le Grelle bank in the 1840s

The youngest son of Gérard Le Grelle and Catherine Oliva, Joseph J. Le Grelle founded the Joseph J. Le Grelle Bank in 1792 at the age of 27. The bank was the oldest bank in the country after the Banque Nagelmackers, founded in 1747. During the French domination in 1792 and the years of terror of the Revolution in 1793, the reliquary of Blessed Anne of St. Bartholomew, the inseparable companion of Teresa of Avila, considered to be the protector of Antwerp, was hidden in the bank's vaults and then in Joseph Le Grelle's linen cabinet.

In a letter from his son, Count Gérard Le Grelle, addressed to Father Marcel Bouix SJ (1806–1889), the story is told that Joseph Le Grelle, having contracted a serious illness, was cured by Anne de Saint-Barthélémy. Joseph J. Le Grelle was later taken hostage and brought to Paris in 1794. He was not released until after the fall of Robespierre. Until the foundation of the National Bank of Belgium in 1850, the Joseph J. Le Grelle Bank was among the few private banks to issue banknotes. Upon Joseph J. Le Grelle's death, the bank was taken over by his widow, Maria Theresia Cambier, and his sons Gérard (1793–1871), Jean (1796–1872), and Henri Joseph (1798–1872). The Joseph J. Le Grelle Bank was an important indirect financier of the Belgian Colonization Company in Guatemala, an ill-prepared expedition that ended in failure. In 1854, faced with the Colonization Company's inability to repay one of its debtors, the bank found itself the owner of 10,640 hectares in Guatemala. The family had lost track of its land since 7 October 1940 but has now taken steps to recover it by hiring an attorney in 2020 to look into the matter. The Joseph J. Le Grelle bank merged through the Bank of Antwerp and the General Bank Corporation with Fortis Bank in 1962.

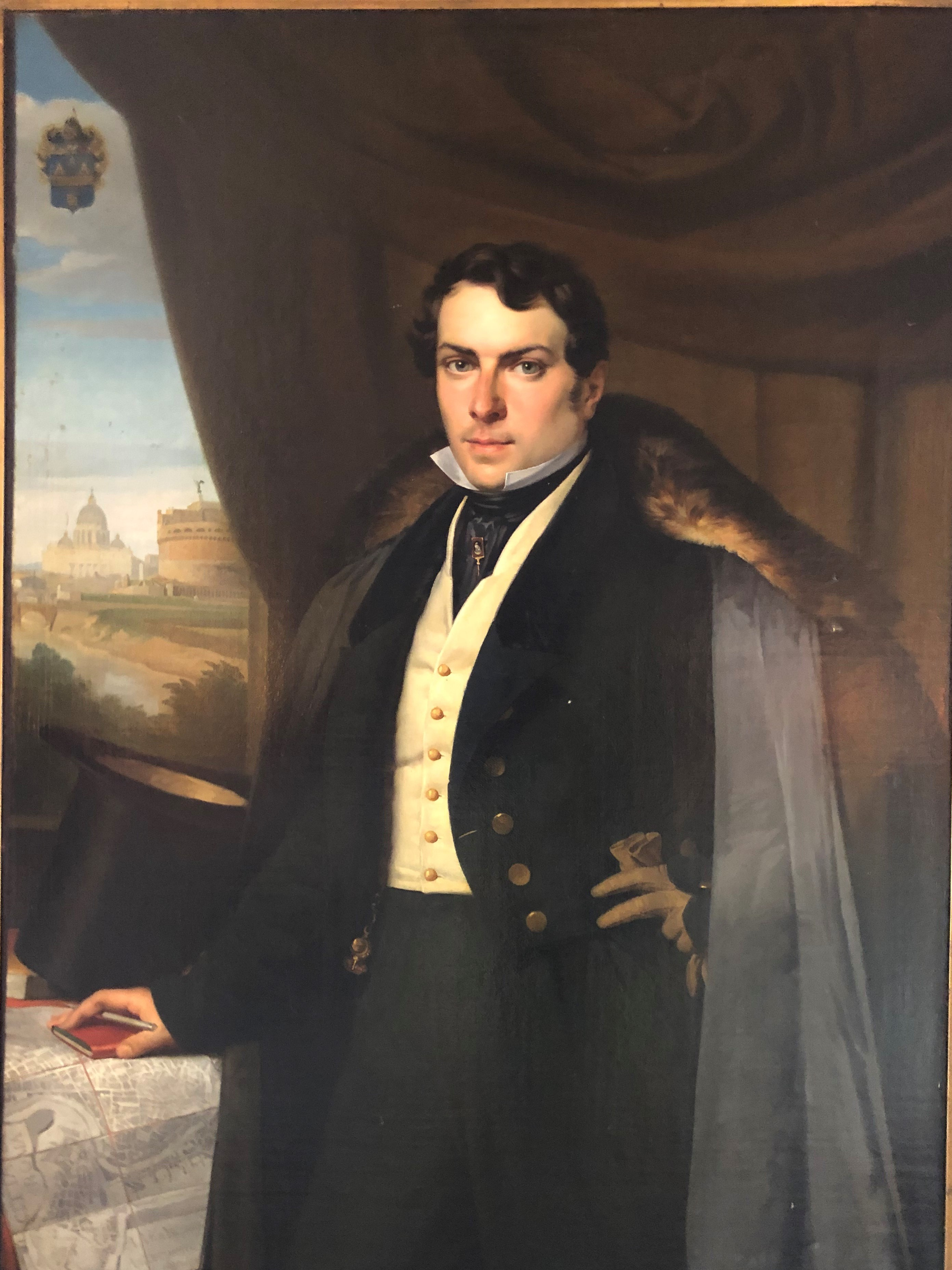
Joseph Guillaume Le Grelle (1795–1880)

==== Joseph-Guillaume Le Grelle (1795–1880) ====
Son of Joseph J. Le Grelle, he founded the Bank Joseph Guillaume Le Grelle in Brussels. He was commissioner of the Bank of Belgium and founder of the Banque Foncière. He was the Knight of Order of St. Gregory the Great and of the Order of St Sylvester.

==== Henri Le Grelle (1798–1872) ====
Henri Le Grelle was the founder of the Commercial Bank of Antwerp. He was also a major shareholder in the incorporation of numerous Antwerp companies. A renowned genealogist, he collected many genealogical trees of families of the Antwerp bourgeoisie. Those documents form the basis of the archives of the Le Grelle Family Association. Henri Le Grelle was married to Julie Le Grelle (of the elder branch). The couple had a chapel named after them in the Cathedral of Our Lady (Antwerp).

==== Count August Le Grelle (1817–1891) ====
Count August Le Grelle, banker at the Joseph J. Le Grelle Bank, was one of the co-founders of the Antwerp Mortgage Bank (Caisse hypothécaire anversoise Anhyp) in 1881, along with his son Count Emile Le Grelle and his brother Count Stanislas Le Grelle (1827–1908). In 1999, Axa Royale Belge took over Anhyp's banking activities. He was the honorary member of the academic body of the University of Antwerp and treasurer of the Royal Academy of Fine Arts, one of the oldest institutions of its kind in Europe. It was founded in 1663 by David Teniers the Younger, painter to the Archduke Leopold Wilhelm and Don Juan of Austria. Count August Le Grelle was a member of the commission of the Royal Museum of Fine Arts, President of the Peter's Pence, Knight of the Order of Leopold, Commander of the Order of Saint Sylvester and founder of the Chapel of the Most Holy Sacrament, located in the Rue du Ciel in Antwerp. He was a patron of the painter Nicaise de Keyser, among others.

Many members of the Le Grelle family were bank managers or directors. Count Oscar Le Grelle (1861–1930) was the director of the Crédit Anversois; Count Gaston Le Grelle (1880–1938) was the managing director of Bank P. Kok & Co in The Hague (The Netherlands); Count Max Le Grelle (1881–1922) served as the managing director of Bank Max Le Grelle & Co in Delft, and Émile Le Grelle was the administrator of the Bank of Brussels and Stanislas of the Bank of Antwerp.

=== The Le Grelle's in Politics ===
Politics has always been important in the Le Grelle family. Since the mid-eighteenth century, the family was responsible for the political management of the city of Antwerp.

==== Henri-Jacques Le Grelle (1753–1826) ====
Henri-Jacques Le Grelle was the alderman of Antwerp and licentiatus in law from the University of Louvain in 1779. In 1790, he swore an oath of loyalty to the Republic of the United States of Belgium and is one of three authors of the 1790 Belgian Constitution. The Constitution of the Republic of the United States of Belgium later formed an important foundation for the Belgian Constitution adopted by the National Congress in 1831. As a squire, Henri-Jacques Le Grelle was ennobled by patent letters from Emperor Francis II, dated 29 January 1794. Together with Joseph Jean Le Grelle, he was among the hostages taken by the French in Het Steen on 7 August 1794, as security for war contribution payments on the Antwerp fortunes. He married Madeleine van Pruyssen (1749–1831).

==== Count Gérard Le Grelle (1793–1871) ====
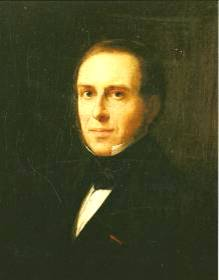
Gérard Le Grelle (1793–1871)

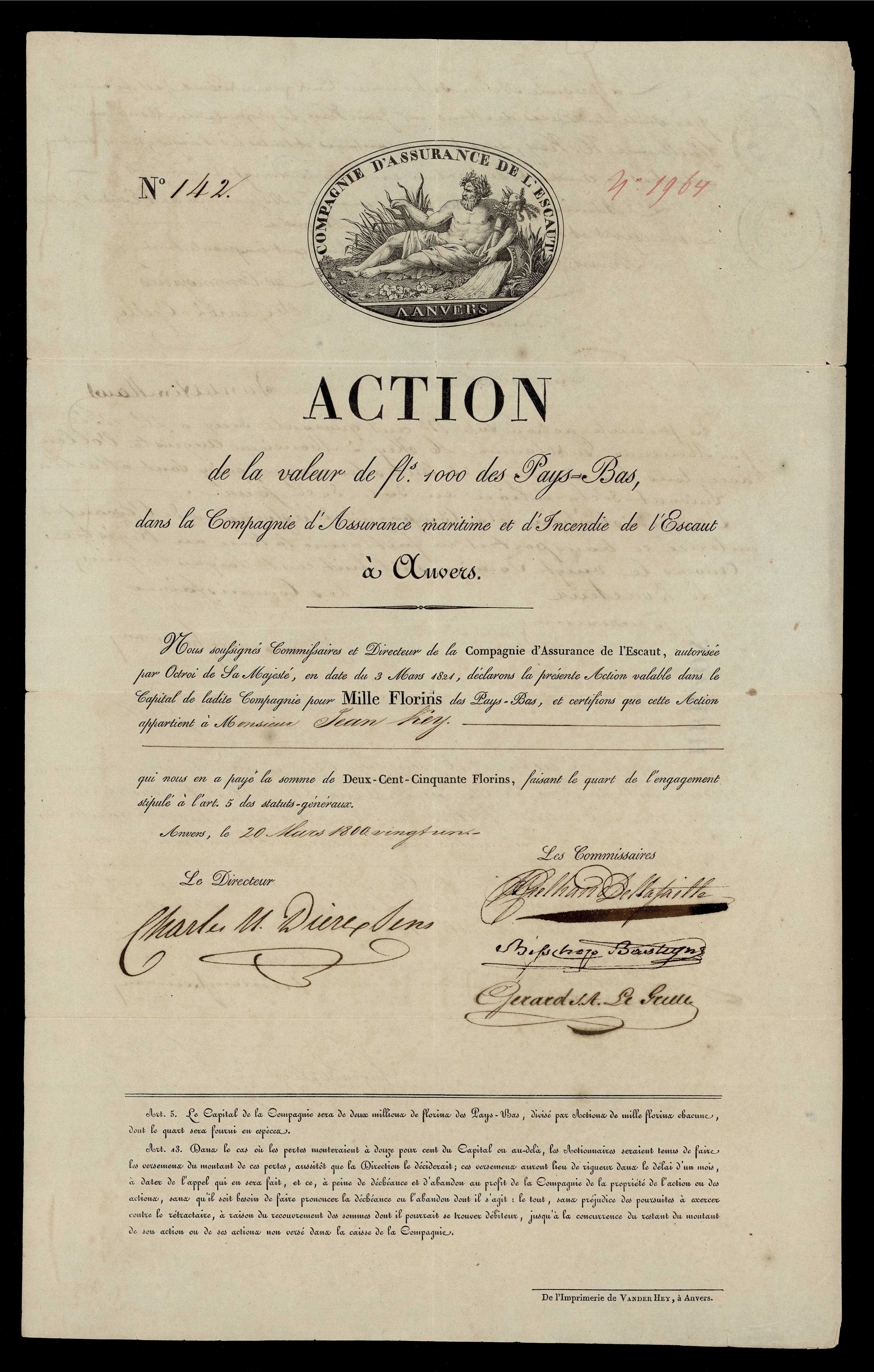
Share of the Compagnie d'Assurance de l'Escault, issued 20 March 1821, signed by Count Gérard Le Grelle

Count Gérard Le Grelle, the son of Joseph J. Le Grelle, was a banker and set up the insurance companies Securitas (1819) and L'Escaut (1821). His situation was hardly comfortable, as the business world was increasingly supporting the Orangism (Dutch Republic) for fear of seeing the Scheldt blocked again by The Netherlands. A supporter of Belgium since his schooling in Brussels with Professor Jean-Baptiste Lesbroussart, Gérard asserted himself, between 1815 and 1830, by categorically refusing any administrative or political office under the Dutch regime and even turning down a proposal to be appointed town councilor. He preferred instead to concentrate his energy on the city of Antwerp and his bank. Together with his brothers Henri (1798–1872) and Edmond (1805–1876), he was a driving force behind the bank, which played an important role in financing the city of Antwerp after the independence of Belgium in 1830. Together with the Rothschild Bank, the Le Grelle Bank was also among the major financiers of the Papal States (which at the time represented a quarter of Italy, from the south of Rome to Bologna) prior to the unification of Italy through the Peter's Pence in 1854 and 1864. Count Gérard Le Grelle's name remains attached to a famous petition for religious freedom in 1825, which earned him Rome's support in 1852.

In 1830, he was a member of the National Congress for the province of Antwerp and then a member of the Chamber of Representatives. He was the first Mayor Burgomaster of Antwerp after independence and held this position for eighteen years. But, he refused a post as Minister of Finance in the government of Belgium.

It was Count Gérard Le Grelle who, in 1836, decided to build the second rail link in Belgium between Mechelen and Antwerp and was the architect of the Iron Rhine, a railway between Antwerp and Mönchengladbach (Germany) to transport goods from the port of Antwerp. His many other initiatives included the improvement of the navigability of the Scheldt, the construction of quays, the repurchase of the toll on the Scheldt from the Dutch, and the construction of the Bourla Theatre. He also created the Rubens festivals in 1840 to create the blossoming of a Belgian atmosphere similar to that which existed at the time of Rubens. Gerard and his son Augustus were also great patrons of the arts, and supported among others Nicaise de Keyser, who gave his name to De Keyserlei street.

At the death of his uncle Henri-Jacques Le Grelle on 19 January 1826, Gerard Le Grelle obtained with his brothers the reversion of the recognition of nobility obtained by Henri-Jacques on 31 July 1822, in the Kingdom of the Netherlands. On 7 September 1852, Pope Pius IX conferred the title of Count on Gerard Le Grelle, which could be passed on to his legitimate descendants. On 10 August 1853, King Leopold I granted him the authorization to bear this title in Belgium, but it was transmissible only by order of male primogeniture. On 8 February 1871, King Leopold II extended the title of Count to all the descendants of Gérard Le Grelle.

==== Count Ferdinand Le Grelle (1823–1895) ====
A banker at the Joseph J. Le Grelle Bank and a politician of the Catholic Party, Count Ferdinand Le Grelle became a Senator of the district of Antwerp in 1885, succeeding John Cogels, son of Senator Frédégand Cogels. He fulfilled this mandate until his death. He was also president of the Peter's Pence, Knight in the Order of Leopold, and Commander of the Order of Saint Sylvester.

==== Count Max Le Grelle (1881–1922) ====
Count Max Le Grelle was a city councilor of the city of Delft. Before dying at the age of forty-one, he was very active in business and charity. He founded the Katholieke Woningbouw Vereeniging Sint Hyppolytus, a housing company in Delft that still manages almost 5,000 houses. Max Le Grelle was also the chairman and managing director of the Max Le Grelle Co Bank in Delft, director at the Incasso Bank, and director of the Standaard Hypotheek Bank. The Max Le Grelle Bank in Delft merged with ABN-Amro. He was a Knight in the Order of St. Gregory the Great and a Knight in the Order of Orange-Nassau. He obtained admission into the Dutch nobility for himself and all his descendants, but died without posterity.

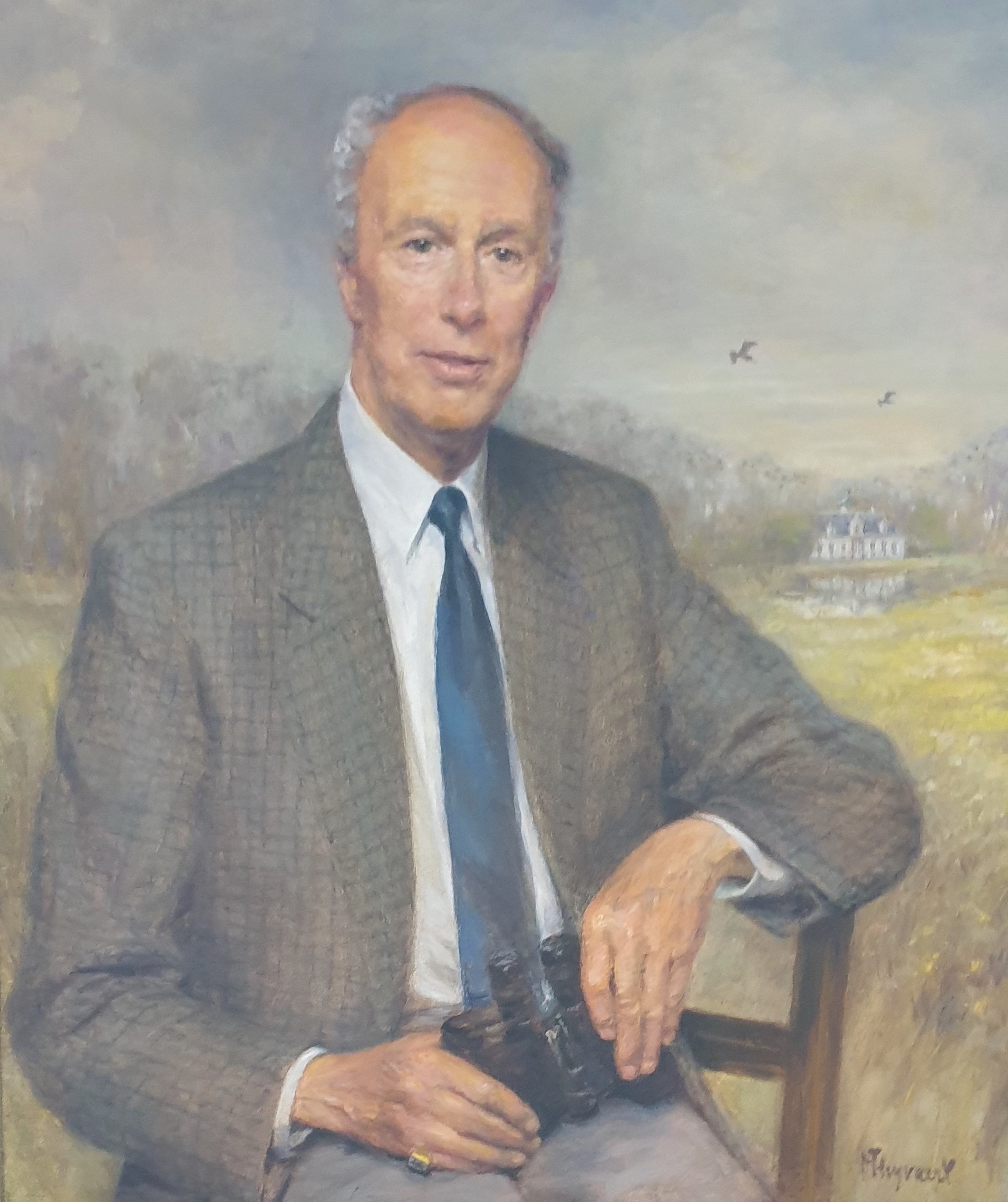
Portrait of Count Daniel Le Grelle by Marie-Thérèse Heyvaert

==== Count Daniel Le Grelle (1922–2018) ====
Count Daniel Le Grelle became a municipal councilor in Antwerp, first as an independent, then as a representative of the Christian Social Party. He was elected in 1958 and remained in office until 1988. He became the founder of the Association for the Preservation of Monuments, which was mainly concerned with the monuments of Antwerp. As a city councilor, he successfully campaigned for the preservation of the Polder municipalities (Berendrecht) that were threatened with extinction due to the expansion of the Port of Antwerp. Count Daniel Le Grelle served as the president of the Belgian-Dutch Association. He participated in the television series De Blauwe Gids (The Blue Guide), devoted to the Belgian nobility, in which he was presented as an ardent nature lover. He was particularly concerned about the annual heron colonies in Berendrecht. Daniel Le Grelle was a member of the Council of Nobility for eight years, alternating as president every two years with a French-speaking colleague. He actively campaigned for the inclusion of prominent Flemish personalities in the nobility. In 1959, Count Daniel Le Grelle co-founded the Heemkundige Kring van de Antwerpse Polder and the Polder Museum, where he served as its president and honorary president for several decades.

==== Count Bernard Le Grelle (1948) ====
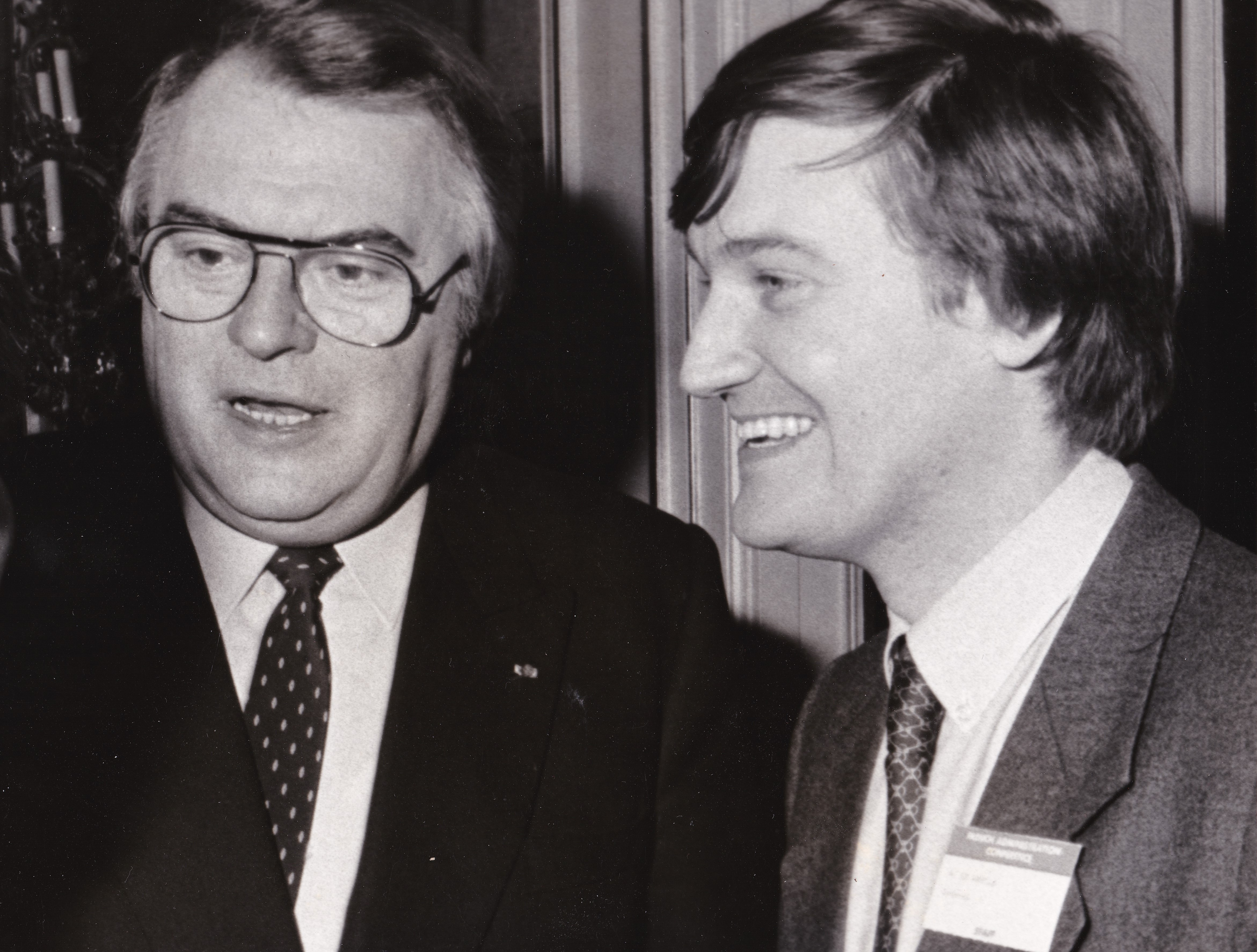
French Prime minister Pierre Mauroy and Bernard Le Grelle

Bernard Le Grelle, a journalist, political adviser, writer, and public affairs executive, was the first Belgian to enter the Columbia University Graduate School of Journalism in New York. He founded and directed The Tobago News. He was a consul of France at the age of 27 in Tobago and when huge oilfields where found off shore, Winston Murray and A.N.R Robinson, who won the two Tobago seats, were supporting a secession from Trinidad, their London representative asked Le Grelle to join a Shadow cabinet and to be Minister of Foreign Affairs.

As the deputy director of Le Nouvel Économiste, he organized the first French economic mission to China since Mao Zedong in 1978 and served as an intermediary between several governments, including South Korea, the Philippines, the United States and China, and major French industrial groups such as Bouygues, Framatome, Air Liquide, Air France, Accor, Essilor and Thomson.

Bernard Le Grelle was the founder of the first European lobbying agency, a partner of Robert K. Grey Robert, former cabinet secretary of President Dwight Eisenhower, a political advisor, and a university professor at La Sorbonne, St. Gallen and HEC Paris. He is the author of Profession Lobbyman and worked as an expert for several United Nations agencies, including UNDP, UNITAR, UNESCO, and WHO and as a consultant for Forbes, The International Herald Tribune and The Wall Street Journal. Bernard Le Grelle served as a policy advisor promoting foreign investments and building their countries image for several prime ministers, including Pierre Mauroy, Wilfried Martens, and Ruud Lubbers; he organized the official trip to the United States of Belgian Deputy Prime Minister Willy De Clercq.

In 1982, Bernard le Grelle was appointed by the French Presidency as director of the National Air and Space Bicentennial Agency. He became a founding member of the US Bicentennial Committee, co-organizing a conference in the Senate with vice-president George H. Bush and in the White House with President Ronald Reagan. On this latter occasion, the logo of the Bicentennial was signed by the four astronauts of the Space Shuttle Columbia. He convinced Senator Charles Mathias and NASA director Jim Beggs to send the Space Shuttle Enterprise on a European tour that included a visit to the Paris Air Show in 1983. The crowd was thrilled to see the Space Shuttle Enterprise arrive on "piggyback" on top of a modified Boeing 747 jumbo jet. Bernard le Grelle and Senator Charles Mathias initiated the United States Congress Joint Resolution 270, officially designating 1983 as the Year of the Bicentennial of Air and Space.

In December 1982, Bernard Le Grelle, Larry Mihlon, a former advisor to President John F. Kennedy, and Charles Mathias came up with an idea to make the U.S. space program more popular with the U.S. taxpayers. Space shuttle launches had become routine and received little media coverage, being relegated, for example, to the eighth page of The New York Times. The idea was to put a teacher in a shuttle flight, from where she would give lessons to children from space, lessons that would be relayed to all schools in the United States via the public television network PBS. This idea was the genesis of the Teacher in Space Project. In 1985, NASA selected Christa McAuliffe to be the teacher, but she perished in the Challenger shuttle accident along with the crew just 73 seconds after liftoff on the morning of Tuesday, 28 January 1986; the incident was broadcast live on CNN. At this time, Bernard Le Grelle was aboard the Boeing 757 of Eastern Airlines bound to Miami, cruising at 39,000 feet above the Kennedy Space Center, when the explosion occurred. Le Grelle, who was on the telephone with Charles Villeneuve, the managing editor of Europe 1 radio station, became the first and only journalist to report the accident live as he watched the explosion. The report was cited among the great scoops of Europe 1 Radio. The Commanding astronaut of Challenger was Francis (Dick) Scobee, who flew the 747 with the Enterprise to le Bourget in 1983 and met with Le Grelle.

From 1982 to 1986, Bernard Le Grelle, along with James I. Campbell Jr., a former member of Senator Edward Kennedy's staff and advisor to Larry Hillblom, the founder of DHL, were instrumental in breaking up the existing postal monopoly in Europe, opening the way for companies such as FedEx, UPS, TNT and DHL to operate on the European continent. In 1986, he was named advisor to the anti-terrorist group set up at the Elysée Palace in liaison with members of an anti-terrorist group of the American Congress and the National Security Council of the United States.

In 2008, Bernard Le Grelle became the president of the Support Committee for the Nobel Prize in Medicine to Jean-Claude Chermann, the main discoverer of the HIV virus. The committee brought together more than 700 doctors, professors, and scientists, including Professor Robert Gallo, a controversial virologist who also worked on the HIV virus. Bernard le Grelle was received by French President Nicolas Sarkozy, who publicly defended Professor Chermann and strongly criticized the Nobel Committee's decision. He was given the honorary Navy Lieutenant status for services rendered to the French Navy. During his career, Bernard Le Grelle was received several times at the White House and has had the opportunity to meet many heads of state and government.

=== Le Grelle's in the press and industry ===
The 19th century saw the family's activities diversify into the press and food industries. In 1893, Count Oscar Le Grelle was the co-founder of the fund that bought the shares of N.V. De Vlijt, publisher of the Gazet van Antwerpen, eventually obtaining control of the newspaper. Count Alfred Le Grelle (1872–1948) was the president of N.V. De Vlijt, with the fund still existing under the name K.I.M. (Katholiek Impuls en Media Fonds). The fund is a shareholder of the Catholic newspapers in Flanders, which have grouped together under the name Mediahuis. Count Gérard Le Grelle was among the founders of Liebig with the German Liebig family in Antwerp. A century later, a Le Grelle shareholder of Liebig married a descendant of the founders of Maggi.

=== The Church and Charity ===
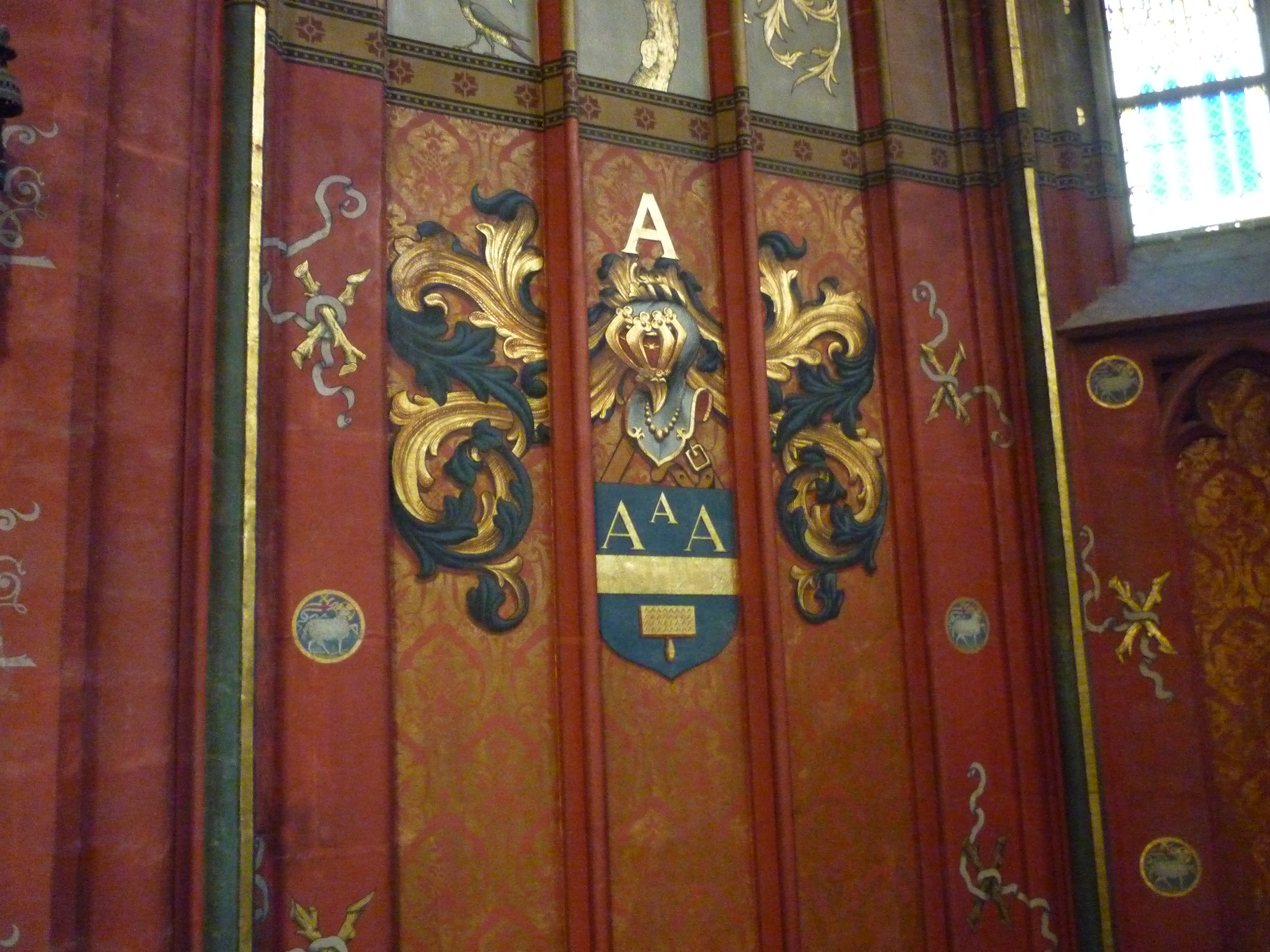
Weapons of Henri and Julie Le Grelle in the cathedral of Antwerp

In Antwerp and its surroundings alone, more than twenty-nine churches and chapels—including the Cathedral, St. Andrew's Church, the Churches of St. Augustine, St. Frederick in Deurne, Our Lady College, the Ursuline school in Wilrijk, the Basilica of Berchem and the small churches of Gestel and Ranst—have stained glass windows or ancient tombstones with the Le Grelle coat of arms.

The family counts three Grand Chaplains (Grand Aumonier) at the head of the former institution, which in the past took care of the city's poorest citizens long before the creation of Public Centers for Social Welfare (CPAS). The honorable function with a one-year term was very expensive because the Grand Chaplain financed those charitable activities himself. In 1771, 1787 and 1795, Jean-Guillaume, Gérard François, and Joseph J. Le Grelle were Grand Chaplain of Antwerp. In 1824, Gérard Le Grelle founded the Maatschappij der Kristelijke Liefdadigheid, which still operates a hospital and manages nursing homes. Numerous convents and religious orders have been able to benefit from Gérard Le Grelle's help. Edmond Le Grelle (1805–1876) married Eulalie Cambier (1806–1862) in 1826, who founded the school of the Ursulines in Wilrijk. Edmond Le Grelle later Marie van Eersel (1815–1866) in 1863 and Bathilde De Wael (1829–1908) in 1867, who set up several schools and hospices in Antwerp. These women made an important contribution to the name Le Grelle. Many members of the Le Grelle family are part of this religious tradition, including Father Aloys, Sisters Thérèse, Marie, Joséphine, Clémence, Engelberte, Madeleine, Agnès, Monsignor Stanislas, Father Maxime, Father Guy and brother Éric. In the Cathedral of Our Lady (Antwerp), a chapel was consecrated by the Le Grelle family and houses a 19th-century triptych.

=== Le Grelle's in sports ===
The family has had some success in the world of sports.

==== Count Léon Le Grelle (1852–1909) ====
Count Leon Le Grelle was a coach and jockey at the stables of Baron Creutz, Baron Osy, and Count van Limburg Stirum in The Netherlands. His nephew, Count Gérard, followed the same path; both won numerous prizes.

==== Countess Diane Le Grelle, known as Pinky (1952) ====
Diane (Pinky) Le Grelle was the first woman to excel at mixed skeet shooting at the 1992 Barcelona Olympics for Great Britain.

==== Count Daniel Le Grelle (1922–2018) ====
Count Daniel le Grelle was a member of the Belgian Olympic Committee for years. He reorganized it and it is now called the Belgian Olympic and Interfederal Committee (COIB). The purpose of the new entity was to help young athletes reach international levels. Count Daniel Le Grelle's work with the committee earned him the Silver Medal of Merit of the Olympic Order. He was close to Jacques Rogge, eighth president of the International Olympic Committee, the supreme authority of the Olympic movement.

==== Sébastien Le Grelle (1974) ====
Sébastien Le Grelle started motorcycling with motocross, competing in motorcycle speed contests beginning in 1995. Very quickly, success was achieved in the promotional categories. In 2000, he took part in eight races at the 2000 Grand Prix motorcycle racing season in the 500cc category. In 2001, he returned to his favorite categories with the same success. He was crowned Belgian champion several times.

==== Baron Charles Bracht (1915–1978) ====
A cousin by marriage, Baron Charles Bracht was an outstanding alpine skier; he competed in the men's combined event at the Fourth Winter Olympic Games of 1936 (the first to include alpine skiing) in Garmisch-Partenkirchen, Germany.

=== The Le Grelle's today ===
==== From Antwerp to New Zealand ====
Today, the name of Le Grelle maintains a strong Antwerp connotation, but the majority of the family no longer lives in the city. Instead, the Le Grelle's are found in Walloon Brabant and France, after a generation spent in the Belgian Congo. Some are Canadian, including the children of Countess Marie-Antoinette Le Grelle and Canadian Ambassador Keith MacLellan. Others have emigrated to New Zealand.

==== Descendants of the Seven Noble Houses of Brussels ====
All Le Grelle's descend at least once from the Seven Noble Houses of Brussels and, among others, from the Burbure de Wesembeek, de Villegas, and de Bernard de Fauconval and part of the family through alliances with the van Ursel, van de Werve, t'Kint, della Faille, de Bergeyck, de Smet, de Robiano, van der Beken Pasteels. Several Le Grelle's descend through alliances of Peter Paul Rubens.

==== Some illustrious cousins ====
Cécilia Sarkozy, the former wife of French President Nicolas Sarkozy, is among the Le Grelle cousins by marriage. "Cécilia also has Belgian cousins. Her mother's half-brothers and half-sisters, as well as their descendants, belong to a great family of Antwerp nobility: the Le Grelle family. Her maternal grandmother Rosalie de Swert (1901–1982), married Count Adelin Le Grelle in 1921 in Valencia, Spain. From this union two children were born, Count Richard Le Grelle (1921) and Countess Marie-Antoinette, who had four children with the Canadian ambassador Keith MacLellan", journalist Marie-Cécile Royen wrote in the Le Vif/L'Express edition of 31 August 2007. When Cécilia became the First Lady of France, Counts Henry and Vincent Le Grelle sent her a case of their Rubens Montagne Saint-Émilion cuvée to the Élysée Palace. They received a warm letter of thanks addressed to "My dear cousins".

Elisabeth de Bernard de Fauconval, who married Count Gérard le Grelle, and their children are cousins of the Smet family and of Jean-Philippe Smet (alias Johnny Hallyday) as well as of the Lefèvre d'Ormesson family and Jean d'Ormesson, writer, journalist and philosopher, member of the Académie Française. They are also cousins of Donna Paola Ruffo di Calabria (1937), who in 1959 married Albert II, King of the Belgians (1934) and mother of King Philip (1960). Marguerite de Mélotte de Lavaux (1864–1952), who married Count Albéric Le Grelle (1860–1934) is a cousin of Viscount Ferdinand de Lesseps (1805–1894), the builder of the Suez Canal and Eugénie de Montijo (1823–1920), who married Charles Louis Napoleon Bonaparte in 1853, who later became Emperor Napoleon III in 1856. Countess Alice Le Grelle, the daughter-in-law of Albéric Le Grelle, piously kept the Golden Rosary that Empress Eugenie had given her.

== Certain Le Grelle Descendants ==
=== Catherine Le Grelle (1760–1819) ===
With her sister Barbe, Catherine Le Grelle fictitiously bought at a public sale in 1795 the presbytery of Saint-Frédégand in Deurne, which had been confiscated by revolutionaries. The two sisters had planned to return the presbytery to the church later, but in revenge, the furniture of the two sisters was confiscated and sold publicly in 1796.

=== Pierre Le Grelle de Rameyen (1769–1841) ===
Pierre Le Grelle de Rameyen married Marie-Josèphe van den Bol (1784–1870). In 1852, his widow obtained an elevation in the rank of nobility in the name of her deceased husband for herself and her five children. This branch of the family died out in 1882. They lived in Rameyen Castle, which had been passed by succession to the de Cock de Rameyen family. Pierre Le Grelle de Rameyen owned the magnificent 16th century Castle Gestelhof in Berlaar. Today, the stately mansion is considered an official monument in Belgium, where it is situated in a national park along the Nete river, some 18 miles from Antwerp.

=== Jean-Antoine Le Grelle (1774–1841) ===
Jean Antoine Le Grelle was the son of Jean-Guillaume (1733–1812) and Marie Thérèse Janssens (1748–1811). On a cadastral map dated 20 April 1815, which mentions Jean-Antoine Le Grelle as owner of the castle of Selsaeten in Wommelgem, one can see that the estate is identical to that of the Agie de Selsaeten until the division of the latter and the sale of the castle in 1951.

=== Edmond Le Grelle (1805–1876) ===
A squire, Edmond Le Grelle inherited the status of nobleman in 1826. He was the captain commander of the Civil Guard in Antwerp. He was a banker at the Joseph J. Le Grelle Bank, officer in the Order of Leopold, commander in the Equestrian Order of the Holy Sepulchre of Jerusalem, and Knight in the Pontifical Equestrian Order of St. Gregory the Great. In June 1853, Edmond Le Grelle received the mission from King Leopold I to travel to Vienna for the planned wedding of Leopold's son, the Duke of Brabant, with S.A.I. and R. Marie-Henriette, the archduchess of Austria. Upon his return in Brussels, Edmond gave the king a portrait of the future queen of the Belgians. He married Eulalie Cambier (1806–1862) in 1826, Marie van Eersel (1815–1866) in 1863, and in 1867 Bathilde De Wael (1829–1908), the sister of Mayor Leopold De Wael. She was a widow and lost her two daughters, who died of black smallpox contracted in a Parisian palace in 1887 just one day apart at the ages of 18 and 15. De Twee Gezusters (The Two Sisters) orphanage was founded in 1889 by Bathilde in memory of her two daughters. They lived in the Middelheim Castle and the "Geleyhuis" in the Meir street.

=== Louis Le Grelle (1817–1852) ===
Louis Le Grelle, also recorded as Legrelle-d'Hanis, was a Belgian horticulturist based at the castle of Berchem, near Antwerp. He sat on the administrative commission of the Royal Horticultural Society of Antwerp and held honorary diplomas from the horticultural societies of Brussels, Mechelen, Ghent, Leuven, Leiden and Bordeaux. He was made a Knight of the Order of Leopold.

Le Grelle cultivated exotic ornamental plants at Berchem and corresponded with the directors of botanical gardens in Belgium and abroad. Species propagated and distributed from his collection included Dioon edule, Gunnera scabra, Ceratozamia mexicana, a Brazilian Didymochlaena, Theophrasta and Jacaranda legrelliana. His palms were displayed in the throne room of the 1848 National Exhibition in Brussels, where the royal family received exhibitors; contemporary accounts record that Leopold I remarked on Le Grelle's Myanthus fimbriatus during his visit and acknowledged his contribution to Belgian horticulture.

His wife, Caroline Le Grelle, was also a horticulturist. The pomegranate cultivar Punica granatum 'Legrelliae' was named in the family's honour by Madame Parmentier, a Belgian horticulturist then resident in the United States.

=== Count Aloys Le Grelle (1818–1883) ===
Count Aloys Le Grelle was a member of the Society of Jesus, vice-provincial of the Jesuits of Belgium, former rector of the colleges of Namur, Liège and Antwerp and of the Jesuit formation of Louvain (Leuven).

=== Mathilde Le Grelle (1847–1928) ===
A composer, Mathilde Le Grelle wrote the Majorcan March for King Alfonso XIII of Spain. In 1895, she published an autobiographical book, A Honeymoon in Chicago. Her husband, Arthur de Cannart d'Hamale, published Quelques Pages sur le Congo (Some Pages about the Congo), which had not yet become a Belgian colony.

=== Charles Le Grelle (1854–1938) ===
He was a squire and the alderman of Etterbeek, where a street bears his name. He was the deputy prosecutor of the king and commissioner of currencies. As an Attorney General of the Egyptian courts, he established the Egyptian judiciary system. He was the grand officer of the Order of the Crown, commander of the Order of Leopold, the grand officer of the Order of Osmaniye, the Order of Medjidiae, the Order of the Crown of Siam, Order of the Crown of Thailand, the commander of the Order of the Star of Romania, and the commander of the Order of the Lion and the Sun of Persia. He lived in the Castle of Engismont in Engis.

=== Count Henry Le Grelle (1865–1934) ===
Contrary to the custom of the time that sent young people from his background to study in Germany, Henri Le Grelle studied in England. Around the age of 18, Henry left for a trip around the world, including a lengthy visit to Ranchi (the present capital of the state of Jharkhand in India), an experience that marked him for life. There he met Father Constant Lievens in a hut in Torpa (today in the diocese of Khunti), located 60 km south of Ranchi, where he created a Jesuit school that still exists, several small churches, and a printing house to spread the news of the savior Jesus Christ. In 1900, with Father Belpaire and Ch. Hertoghe, Henry Le Grelle founded a bakery cooperative "Het Beste Brood" in Antwerp (dissolved in the 1990s), which played an important role in the distribution of bread in Antwerp between the two wars. The bread was delivered in small carts pulled by ponies. He also set up a technical school for chaplains which was still in existence in 2019, a savings and pension fund (Spaar en Lijfrentekas), a coal trade (the Algemene Kolen Vereniging) to supply the bakery's oven and enable workers to buy coal at a favorable price as well as the "Queen" chocolate factory. Count Henry Le Grelle's purpose for launching these enterprises was political, that is, to counter the Socialists. Human contact and customer loyalty allowed him to convey a different message from that of socialism. He also left precious writings on the living conditions of the Indians in the 19th century.

=== Comte Alfred Le Grelle (1872–1948) ===
He was the president of the N.V. De Vlijt (Gazet van Antwerpen).

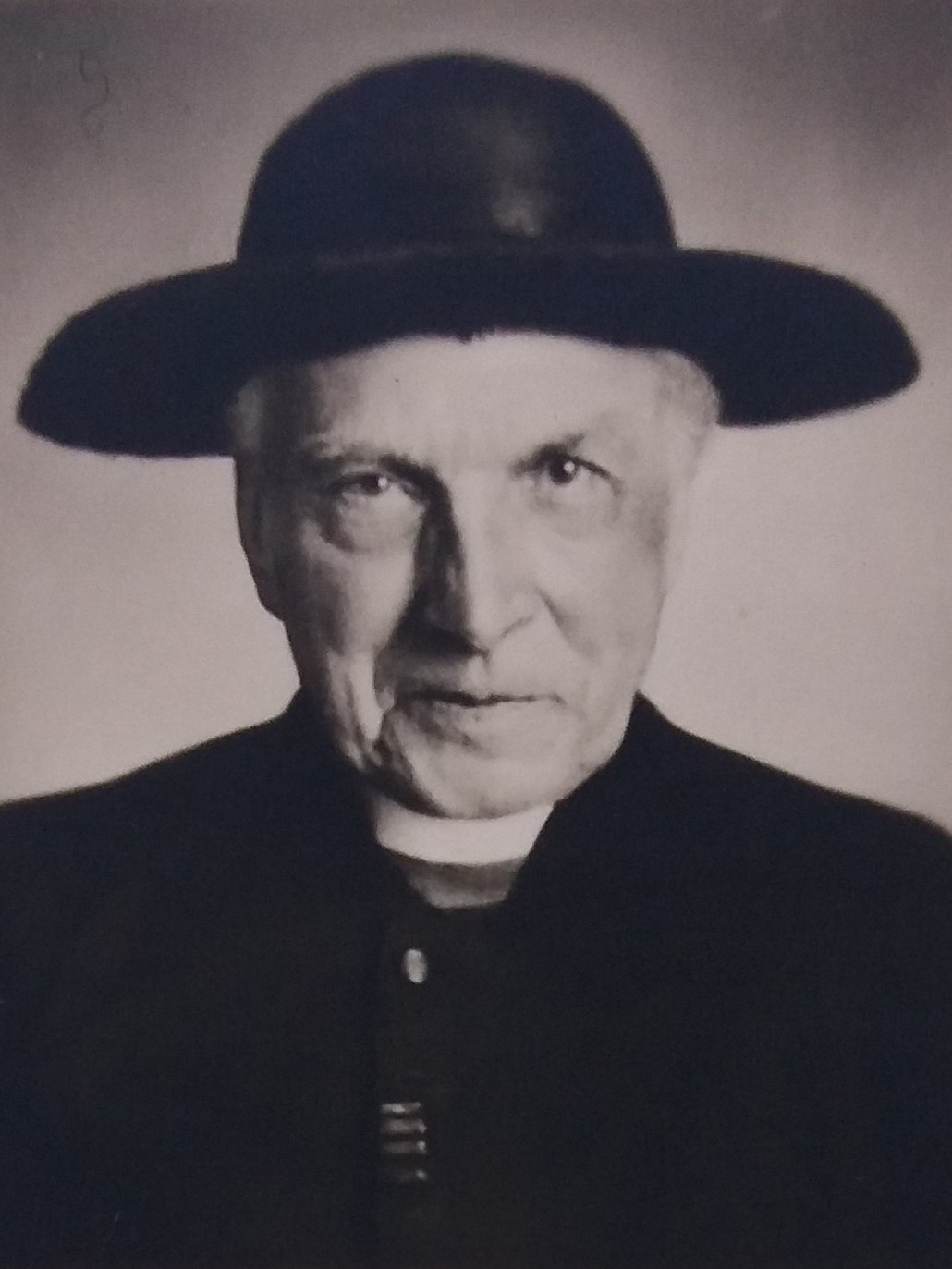
Monsignor Stanislas Le Grelle (1874–1957)

=== Count (Monsignor) Stanislas Le Grelle (1874–1957) ===
The tenth of Stanislas and Adelaïde (born de Villegas de Saint-Pierre Jette) Le Grelle's twelve children, Count Stanislas Le Grelle became a priest and was promoted to Doctor of Philosophy and Theology. He became the head Chaplain of the Belgian Army in 1914. In 1940–1945, he was a member of the Secret Army.

With his inheritance, he had bought a palazzo near the Janiculum in Rome (this house was later bought by the Ruffo di Calabria, the parents of Queen Paola). He occupied the top floor and rented rooms for a small fee to theology students. One of them, who was two-year younger, became his friend. His name was Eugenio Pacelli and he was elected pope in 1939 as Pius XII. Stanislas Le Grelle became Papal chamberlain as well as serving as assistant librarian of the Vatican. He was one of the few prelates to have a very personal relationship with the Pope. But it was also an original. Belgian Prime Minister Léo Tindemans (1974–1979), told Henry Le Grelle the following anecdote. Monsignor Le Grelle used to shower in one of the Vatican's fountains in the morning, much to the chagrin of the Swiss guards. They did not dare to question a Monsignor, close to the Pope, but their colonel opened up directly to Pius XII, who very diplomatic simply suggested to him to cut the water from the fountain. Since then this fountain has always remained dry.

When the library of the Catholic University of Louvain was destroyed in August 1914 by the invading German forces - with the loss of approximately 230,000 books, 950 manuscripts, and 800 incunabula - Monsignor Stanislas Le Grelle played a major role in rebuilding the collection of books. The building was rebuilt with international effort, but the formidable collection of books had disappeared. Beginning in 1920, the library's collections were rebuilt with donations from all around the world, outraged by the barbaric act which it had suffered. The collection was largely reconstructed by a large donation of books from the Vatican library. Stanislas Le Grelle, a scriptor of the Vatican Apostolic Library at that time, intervened to organize the transport of the books to Louvain. Ambassador Freddy Cogels, a counsellor at the Belgian embassy in Rome (Quirinal), wrote in his book, Memoirs of a Diplomat, how Monsignor Le Grelle, given his gifts as a diviner, had cured more than 4,000 patients, including many suffering from cancer. The French weekly news magazine Paris-Match devoted a report to him.

Monsignor Stanislas Le Grelle is also associated with a strange affair. The Belgian Ministry of Foreign Affairs organized a charity, hosted by leading celebrities, every year in Brussels. Ambassador Cogels was asked at the end of 1954 to negotiate the presence of Sophia Loren. Since she was afraid of flying, Loren recommended that a young actress, Marcella Mariani, be invited in her place. Mariani boarded a Sabena flight at the last minute hosted the charity ball. On her return 13 February 1955, a Sunday, the Sabena flight 503 Melsbroek-Leopoldville crashed in the Apennines, not far from Rome. The Italian army had drawn up a plan to sweep the entire mountain range in successive sectors. Monsignor Le Grelle telephoned the embassy on the subsequent Friday and revealed the location of the wreckage and the victims, stating that there might be a few survivors. On Monday, 21 February, soldiers found the wreckage and bodies of the victims barely 200 meters from the location disclosed by Stanislas. It is unknown how he learned the wreckage's location.

On 6 June 2010, fifty-five years after the events, the children of the victims returned to the scene, to inaugurate a monument and an exhibition and on 13 February 2015, the Belgian Embassy in Rome organized a ceremony to commemorate the 29 victims of the crash. Monsignor Le Grelle was honored on this occasion.

Monsignor Stanislas Le Grelle also served as the honorary president of the Le Grelle Family Association, which he created in 1955 with his cousins, nephews, and nieces: Countess Elisabeth Le Grelle and Counts Stanislas, André and Marc Le Grelle. He bequeathed to the association a large number of documents he and his great uncle, Henri Le Grelle, a renowned amateur genealogist, gathered over many years. Monsignor Le Grelle was Knight in the Order of Leopold with Palm and decorated with the Croix de Guerre 1914–18. He is buried in the Vatican.

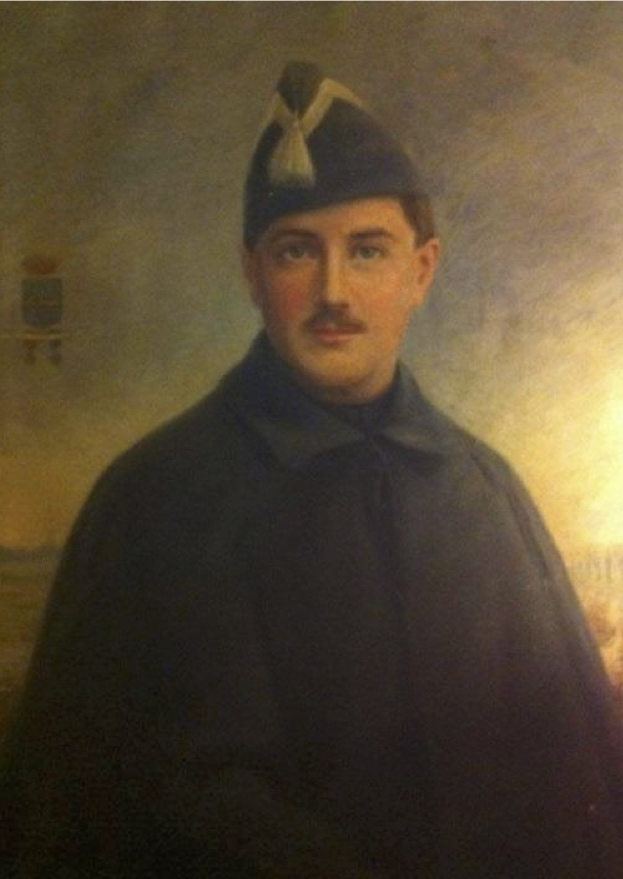
Count Albert Le Grelle (1888–1914)

=== Count Albert Le Grelle (1888–1914) ===
Posthumously named Knight of the Order of Leopold II with Palm and War Cross, Count Albert Le Grelle died for Belgium at Kaaskerke. Albert had studied at the Notre Dame de la Paix faculty in Namur. From December 1913 to July 1914, he followed about sixty painting courses with the portrait painter Alidor Lamote (1880–1949), and a still life he painted in 1914 was finished just a few months before his death. Like many young men, he was a war volunteer, brigadier in the 13th Lancers Regiment, motorcyclist on the staff of the 3rd division.

During the Battle of the Yser, in an attack by about a hundred German soldiers at Kaaskerke, near Diksmuide, on the night of 25–26 October 1914, the Belgians closed the line of defense, but 25 Germans managed to withdraw taking various prisoners. At dawn, the Germans shot many of them, before being taken prisoners in turn by the French. His body was not found until two years later. In his campaign diary written during the 1914–1918 war, Jean de Ryckel, Albert's cousin by their mothers, wrote: "On November 13, 1916, we received a visit from our first cousin Paul de Melotte who announced that the body of our common first cousin, Count Albert Le Grelle, had just been found in Caeskerke. His body was identified in an extraordinary way. New trenches were dug in Caeskerke and many corpses were discovered. In a cavalry coat was found a watch, a revolver, a wallet, and a prayer book. The prayer book contained a souvenir of the First Communion of Marie-Thérèse Le Grelle, his sister, and the watch was recognized by one of Albert's friends. This watch had been bought in Antwerp at the beginning of the hostilities by the two friends".

=== Count André Le Grelle (1903–1983) ===
Count André Le Grelle was the president of N.V. De Vlijt, publisher of the Gazet van Antwerpen. He was the director of numerous companies, the president of Winterhulp 40/45, the organization of Red Cross volunteers who came to the aid of the most destitute during the winters of the last war. He was the owner of Reet Castle and the president of the Le Grelle Family Association (1955–1983).

=== Count Jacques Le Grelle (1904–1990) ===
Count Jacques Le Grelle lived intensely. He was a frequent host of large parties, attended by men in tuxedos and women in long dresses, and he had many friends. He also traveled frequently, including twice to America on Esso tankers. These trips had an effect on his manner of speaking, as he kept an American accent all his life. He hunted in Hungary, at the time governed (since 1919) by the Regent Miklós Horthy. In December 1934, he went skiing in Austria in the resort of Obergurgl, not far from Innsbruck, where he won the "Pickard Kuppe" and met a German officer. On 28 May, the Belgian army laid down its arms and Jacques Le Grelle was held prisoner in Eeklo. With incredible luck, the German officer who guarded the column of prisoners was the man he had met skiing in Austria. The officer gave him a few Entlassungsscheinen (liberation certificates) that enabled Jacques Le Grelle to free himself and several comrades, while 171,000 other soldiers and officers - prisoners of war - were deported to Germany.

Jacques Le Grelle left Belgium, crossed France and the Pyrenees, and was arrested near Figueras (Spain). He finally reached Gibraltar and England on 10 August 1942. In London, he found Colonel Piron, whom he had known in 1939. The latter offered him the position of Chief of Staff but Jacques Le Grelle refused. The Belgian Military Security, led by Colonel Bernard, asked him if he was ready to return to the continent. He was entrusted to MI9, the military intelligence department number 9, the organization in charge of recovering and bringing back to England resistance fighters, soldiers, and pilots. As early as 1940, Brigadier Crocket had considered it necessary to recover the airmen whose aircraft would be shot down on the continent. Given that the duration of the training of aviators (pilots, navigators, bombers, radio operators, machine-gunners...) was four years, whereas it took only four days to build an aircraft, it was important to recover the men when they fell behind enemy lines. Moreover, it was reassuring for the pilots to know that in case of being shot down they would have a 50 per cent chance of being recovered.

MI9 included Airey Neave (called "Saturday"), an officer who made a spectacular escape from the Colditz Fortress. Jacques Le Grelle entered training immediately and performed the exercise jumps, but fractured his spine during the exercises. In May 1943, after eight months of convalescence, he was personally accompanied by Airey Neave to the Pembroke Dock base where he boarded a seaplane. Airey Neave later recounted how painful this had been for him, knowing that his "colt" Jacques had a nine-in-ten chance of losing his life in the mission. Jacques Le Grelle returned under the name of Jerome as a member of the Comet Line which helped Allied soldiers and airmen return to the United Kingdom. As head of the Paris sector from August 1943 to January 1944, he followed the grassroots organizations of Andrée De Jongh, the co-founder of the network. With the assistance of the message "For the big birds, there are no Pyrenees" broadcast by the BBC in the spring of 1943, Jacques Le Grelle was able to have the Comet Line contacts organized up to Normandy. He was captured, tortured at length, and sentenced to death but was saved just in time by American troops during the liberation of the Amberg concentration camp on 23 April.

After the war, he was a military observer for the United Nations in Kashmir. In 1952, he was a UN observer based in Damascus during a mission to protect the peace between the new state of Israel and the neighboring Arab countries. In 1970, he was received by Queen Elizabeth II at Buckingham Palace and in 1984 by King Baudouin at the Royal Palace of Laeken.

=== Father Maxime Le Grelle (1906–1984) ===
Father Maxime le Grelle was a Jesuit priest and Belgian writer. His work Brouage-Québec: Foi de pionniers (1976), recounted the lives of 17th century French adventurers, particularly those of Samuel Champlain and Pierre Dugua de Mons in founding New France. The book was awarded the Montcalm Prize in 1977 and the Prix Georges-Goyau in 1978 by the Académie Française. "Rendering Dugua de Mons the tribute to which he is entitled does not in any way detract from Champlain. On the contrary, it is encouraging to see the perfect harmony between these two men, one Catholic and the other Protestant, in the creation of Quebec City, a cause that is dear to both of them," wrote Maxime Le Grelle. Another of Father Maxime Le Grelle's books, Champlain nous voilà (Champlain Here We Are) was a great success.

In 1970, Father Maxime Le Grelle was appointed as the parish priest of Brouage and he moved to Hiers-Brouage, where Samuel Champlain, the founder of Québec City, was born in 1570. He restored the church of Brouage, where eight stained glass windows illustrate the civil and religious history of New France. He also worked to bring the French region of Charente-Maritime and Quebec closer together and led the France-Quebec Association for several years. He was at the origin of the twinning of the parishes of Saint–Stanislas de Champlain (Canada) and Hiers-Brouage (France) and of the 1973 France-Canada exhibition devoted to the origins of New France. Through this exhibition, Father Le Grelle wished to show "the historical and religious ties that unite France and Canada". Father Maxime Le Grelle often said Mass in Colombey-les-Deux-Eglises, with General Charles de Gaulle among the parishioners.

=== Countess Marie-Antoinette Le Grelle (MacLellan) (1923–2002) ===
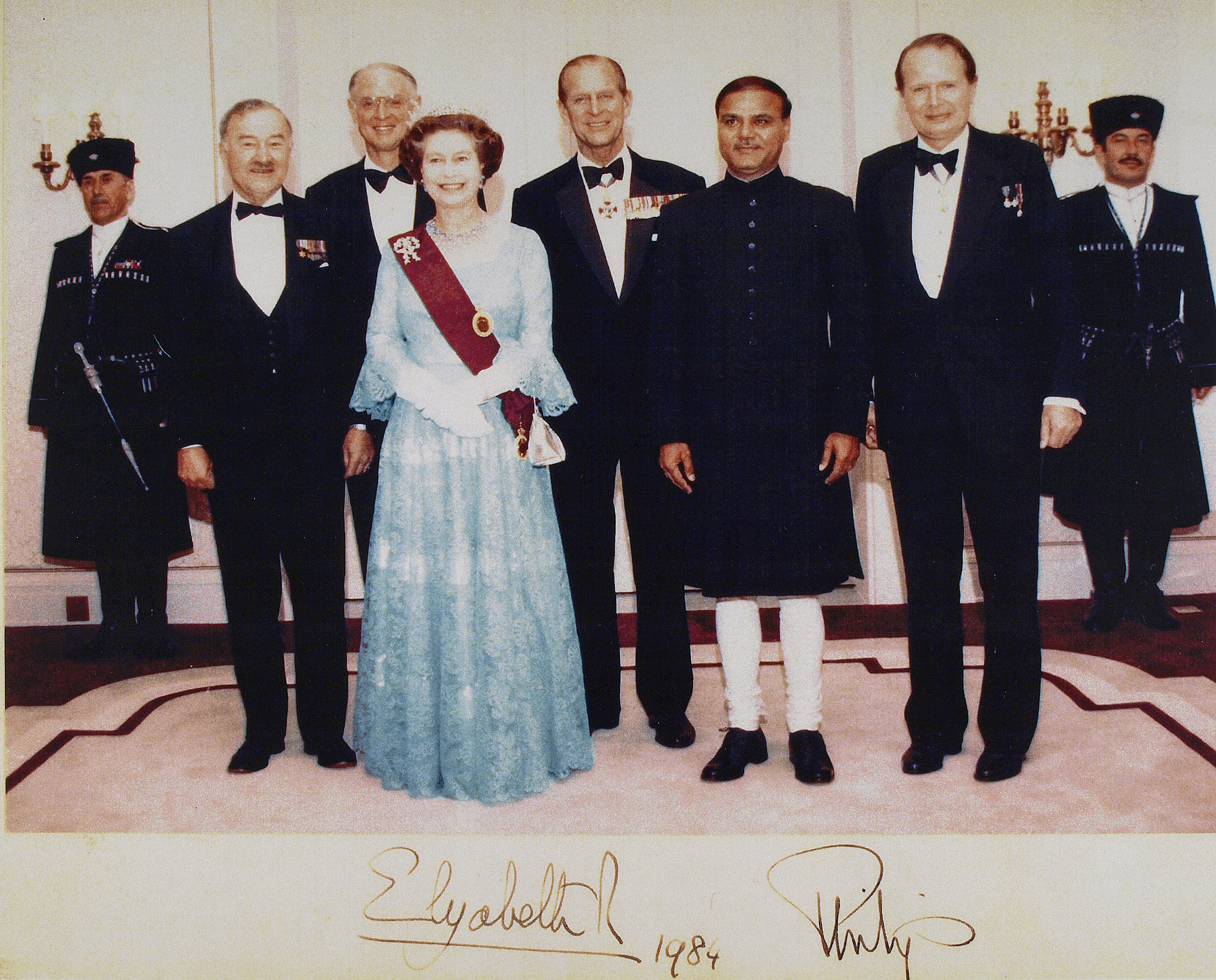
In the Royal Palace in Amman (Jordan) in 1984, Ambassador Keith MacLellan, Queen Elisabeth II, the Indian and British Ambassadors, the Australian Ambassador and Prince Philip

Daughter of Count Adelin Le Grelle and Rosalie de Swert, Countess Marie-Antoinette was the cousin of Cécilia Sarkozy, the second wife of former French President Nicolas Sarkozy. In 1944, at the liberation of Antwerp, she met Keith MacLellan. Like many young people of his generation, MacLellan had been forced to interrupt his studies during the war and joined the Royal Montreal Regiment, with whom he trained, was appointed an officer and sent to the United Kingdom, where he was transferred to the 1st Special Air Service (1st SAS). He became one of only two Canadians to serve in the 1st SAS during the war. At that time, he was part of small, jeep-mounted units operating behind enemy lines in Belgium, the Netherlands, Germany, and Norway. After the war, on 11 September 1946, Marie-Antoinette married Keith MacLellan while he was a student at Oxford. An ambassador to many countries, MacLellan was a Canadian diplomat who helped shape Canada's multilateral foreign policy after the war and championed the cause of a united federal Canada. Four children were born of the marriage between Marie-Antoinette and Keith MacLellan: Dr. Keith MacLellan, Dr. Anne-Marie MacLellan, Janet MacLellan and Andrew MacLellan. Anne-Marie knew Cecilia well, when she was a child, she went to see the Ciganer family with her in Paris. She then met her several times in Paris with her first husband, the television host Jacques Martin.

=== Count Guy Le Grelle (1926–2016) ===
A priest with the Society of Jesus, Count Guy Le Grelle was a professor at St. Xavier College, an inventor of electronic games, the archival secretary for the Bollandists, an association of scholars, philologists, and historians, who since the early seventeenth century have studied hagiography and the cult of the saints in Christianity.

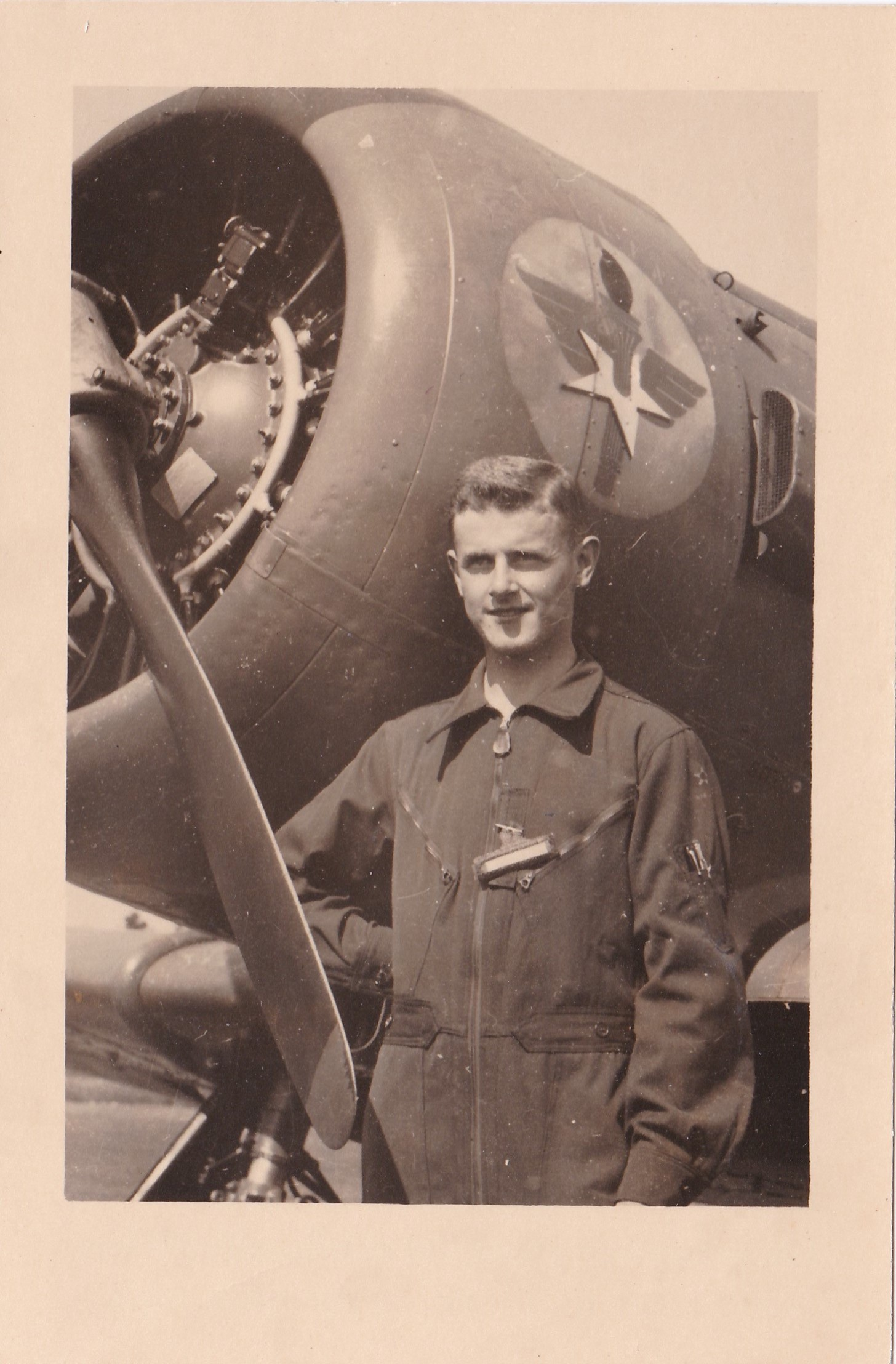
Count Hervé Le Grelle (1927–1953)

=== Count Hervé Le Grelle (1927–1953) ===
The Atlantic Alliance was formed on 4 April 1949 in response to the threat of Communism, and it was in this troubled context that the Belgian Air Force was reconstituted. The demand for personnel and equipment was high because east–west tensions required increased vigilance in NATO airspace. The fear of a new world conflict, caused by the Berlin Crisis and especially by the Korean War that broke out in 1950, further reinforced the need for pilots. In 1948, Belgium - like other member countries of the Atlantic Alliance - signed a military cooperation agreement with the United States. In the same year, the United States signed a military cooperation agreement with Belgium. The Mutual Defense Assistance Act covered not only the delivery of military equipment, especially aircraft, but also personnel training. Thus, as early as 1951, the first Belgian students went to the United States to be trained as pilots.

Hervé Le Grelle signed up at a very young age as a candidate pilot. Enthusiastic and funny, he even tried to recruit his friends to join the Belgian Air Force by being photographed in a small magazine of the time wearing uniforms of various styles with the caption: "Hervé valiantly, but vainly, tried to recruit us into the Belgian Air Force by wearing the latest styles of uniforms simultaneously." He left in October 1952 for Stallings Air Base in Kinston, North Carolina, to train as a fighter pilot for NATO. His commander was James Evans. By chance, years later, his cousin Henry Le Grelle was in a business relationship with Lancaster Colony, presided by the same James Evans, who was able to tell him many anecdotes about Hervé, a young pilot who had shown exceptional qualities that destined him for a brilliant career. Hervé was later transferred to the Connally Base in Waco (Texas). He died during a formation flying exercise on 27 April 27, 1953. His body was repatriated to Antwerp in November 1956 on the Lubilash with those of twenty other Belgian pilots shot down during the Korean War or while serving in the United States. On this occasion, the Maritime Agency organized a ceremony on quay 242 of the port of Antwerp that was attended by many military and political personalities, including the Minister of State Frans Van Cauwelaert. The 21 coffins were lined up in the temporary morgue, covered with the Belgian national colors. On each coffin, the Maritime Agency had placed flowers. Hervé Le Grelle has been made posthumously Knight in the Order of Leopold II.

=== Count Didier Le Grelle (1930–2009) ===
Count Didier le Grelle was a fund administrator, a majority shareholder of N.V. De Vlijt, publisher of the Gazet van Antwerpen and president of the Le Grelle Family Association.

=== Count Hughes Le Grelle (1931–2019) ===
Son of Jacques, Count Hughes Le Grelle was a paracommando officer who first jumped on Stanleyville during Operation Dragon Rouge, the code name for the 24 November 1964 mission in the former Belgian Congo during which the paracommandos freed hundreds of Belgian and foreign hostages held in Stanleyville by Congolese rebels led by Christian Gbenye of the Simba rebellion. By 1964, the Léopoldville government, supported by Western powers, was gaining a foothold in its fight to suppress the communist-backed Simba rebellion. Fearing an inevitable defeat, the rebels resorted to taking hostages of the local white population in areas under their control. On 28 October, the Simba rebels arrested all Belgians and Americans in Stanleyville. Several hundred hostages were taken to Stanleyville and placed under guard in the Victoria Hotel. The Léopoldville government turned to Belgium and the United States for help. In response, the Belgian army sent a task force to Léopoldville, airlifted by the U.S. 322nd Airlift Division. Washington and Brussels worked jointly on a rescue plan. The soldiers took over Stanleyville first. Hughes Le Grelle then participated in the liberation of Paulis (Operation Black Dragon) but, although young officers were motivated to continue to save their fellow citizens, their commander had to stop their ardor, for the mission. Due to the growing international pressure, Belgium and the United States decided to abandon plans for follow-on operations. The paracommandos returned to Belgium after six days, where they were received with great pomp, taking part in a historic ticker-tape parade going back on Rue Royale to the Brussels Courthouse on 1 December 1964. Hugues Le Grelle also participated in Operation Red Bean, the Battle of Kolwezi in 1978. After his retirement, he took over the management of the family business Het Beste Brood, where he organized the sale and complete exit of the capital for the entire Le Grelle family.

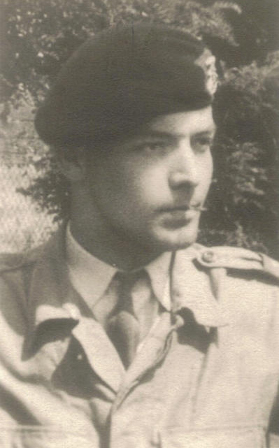
Count Arnold Le Grelle (1934–1961)

=== Count Arnold Le Grelle (1934–1961) ===
Count Arnold Le Grelle was Lieutenant in the 1st Regiment of Guides (Premier Régiment des Guides), which is a famous regiment created in 1833 with a lot of traditions. During many years, most officers did belong to the Belgian aristocracy and in the officer's mess every officer had his napkin ring with his title and coat of arms. He died on active duty at Elisabethville in Katanga. After being assigned to the Katanga group of Colonel BEM Champion, who took part in missions in southern Katanga to reassure isolated Belgian settlers and missionaries in 1960, he was sent back to Katanga as a volunteer by the Belgian Ministry of African Affairs in January 1961. On September 13, 1961, the UN launched Operation Morthor (United Nations Operation in the Congo), aimed at ending by force the secession of Katanga from the Congo. It was under these circumstances that Lieutenant Arnold Le Grelle was accidentally shot in the heart by a UN Blue Helmet soldier from the Indian Army Gurkha Contingent Gurkha while he was standing in a scout car. Lieutenant Count Le Grelle is a Knight in the Order of Merit of Katanga and was awarded the Katangese Military Cross. At the Royal Military Academy, there is the tradition of assigning a godfather to each promotion. This godfather, selected in view of serving as an example, is presented to each incoming promotion during the annual opening of the academic year. Lieutenant Count Arnold Le Grelle is the godfather of the 126th promotion of the Social and Military Science Faculty (SSMW).

== The Le Grelle's today ==
=== Count François Xavier Le Grelle, called Frank (1935) ===
Count Francois Xavier Le Grelle emigrated by ship to Australia in 1960, where he worked as a builder, mostly in Canberra. In 1964 he travelled to New Zealand and settled in Christchurch, where he built a house in Burwood and married Pauline O'Malley. Prior to the birth of their third child, the family moved to a rural property at West Melton, west of Christchurch, where François started construction of a new house in 1975. François has also done construction work in New Caledonia and Samoa.

=== Count Henry le Grelle (1937) ===
Municipal councilor of Brasschaat for more than twenty years, linked by marriage to the Friling and Bracht families (descendants of the painter Eugen Bracht), Henry Le Grelle was director of several family companies. He is president of the real estate company Fond Roy, administrated the Belgian-Arab Chamber of Commerce in Antwerp, served as ambassador of the WWF (Belgium) and administrated the Youth International Chamber (JCI), the world federation of 200,000 young active citizens, aged 18 to 40. Henry Le Grelle, his son Count Vincent Le Grelle (1963) and his daughter Countess Stéphanie (1964) are the owners of Château La Tuilerie des Combes vineyards located in the commune of Lussac and Montagne, a world-famous wine region. The wines of Château La Tuilerie des Combes Montagne Saint-Émilion, Cuvée Rubens Montagne Saint-Émilion, and Lussac Saint-Emilion have won numerous international medals and awards. They also acquired the vineyard of Château de Ségur and the castle of Ségur, where the famous Countess de Ségur wrote Sophie's Misfortunes. Henry Le Grelle is the author of the book Gentleman Globetrotter, in which he recounts his many travels and his encounters with international political figures. Grand Master of Honor of the Order of Papegay. He is descended from Peter Paul Rubens through his mother and Balthazar Plantin through his great-grandmother, Euphrasie du Bois.

=== Count Bernard J. Le Grelle (1947) ===
Count Bernard J. Le Grelle is the genealogist of the family. He is a Member of Probus Belgium and secretary of his club. He is the creator and publisher of the address book of the descendants of Count Gérard Le Grelle.

=== Count Roland Le Grelle (1949) ===
Count Roland Le Grelle is, as member of the KIM Fund, the last shareholder of the Le Grelle family in N.V. De Vlijt, and now a shareholder of the Flemish Catholic newspapers, grouped in Mediahuis. As a representative of the Catholic press he was received by Pope Francis in 2018. He was President of the Family Association Le Grelle from 2009 till 2016).

=== Count Reynald Le Grelle (1957) ===
Second lieutenant in the 1st Regiment of Guides, a graduate (MBA) of the University of Dallas in Irving, Texas, and founder-director in Seoul of the Leo Burnett agency for Korea and Southeast Asia, Count Reynald Le Grelle married Florence Didisheim, the daughter of Count Michel Didisheim.

=== Countess Anita Le Grelle (1959) ===
Sculptor, graduate of The Royal College of Art in London, Countess Anita Le Grelle's creations have been exhibited in Belgium and London.

=== Countess Stéphanie Le Grelle (1964) ===
Daughter of Count Henry Le Grelle, Countess Stéphanie Le Grelle became passionate about art from an early age as a result of discovering the famous painter Caspar Friedrich (1774–1840), whose great theme is contemplative solitude, where the vastness of Nature reminds man of his precariousness. Countess Stéphanie's family includes several artists, the most famous of which is most certainly the landscape painter Eugen Bracht. After studying at the international Dell'arte University in Florence, she devoted herself at an early age to drawing and started to exhibit regularly in Belgium. Countess Stéphanie is also co-owner of the vineyards La Tuilerie des Combes located in the communes of Lussac and Montagne as well as of the Ségur Castle and vineyard.

=== Count Emmanuel Le Grelle (1965) ===
Count Emmanuel Le Grelle is the Founding Director of the La Vallée des Singes ("The Valley of the Monkeys") primate park in Romagne, France. The park, well known for its three species of great apes, first obtained gorillas in 1998 and obtained its chimpanzees in 2004. La Vallée des Singes is famous for its group of bonobos, with the largest group in captivity as of 2016 numbering at 20 individuals. The zoo has had five successful births for this critically endangered species.

=== Brother Eric Le Grelle (1966) ===
A priest belonging to the community of the Brothers of Saint John, often named "Les Petits Gris" (Little Grey), Brother Eric Le Grelle is in charge of the Association Saint Jean Espérance, which welcomes young people between the ages of 18 and 35 who are addicted to heroin and other types of drugs. He is the holder of the Chalice of Mgr Stanislas Le Grelle, which is always entrusted to a priest of the family.

=== Count Arnaud Le Grelle (1968) ===
Lieutenant colonel in the Belgian Defense, master in public affairs and international relations from the Catholic University of Louvain (UCL) and master in management from the ICHEC Brussels Management School, ICHEC Brussels Management School. Arnaud Le Grelle is a lobbyist, director (Wallonia-Brussels) of the Federation of Human Resources Service Providers (Federgon), which represents companies active in the field of HR services. Franco-Belgian, he belongs through his mother, born Anne-Marie, Viscountess Audren de Kerdrel, to one of the oldest families of the French nobility from the Finistère (Brittany).

=== Count Grégory Le Grelle (1980) ===
Gregory Le Grelle graduated in horticulture from the Institut supérieur industriel agronomique de Gembloux and graduated in garden architecture and landscape in Brussels. He discovered that to create a garden it took a very thorough knowledge of the requirements and characteristics of plants and decided to make botany its specificity. He follows in the footsteps of his well-known botanist ancestor Louis Le Grelle (1817–1852), who gave the name legrelliana to several plants.

=== Count Edmund Le Grelle (1972) ===
Member of the "New Zealand branch" of the Le Grelle family, Count Edmund Le Grelle is the son of François Xavier Le Grelle. Edmund Le Grelle lives in Christchurch (New Zealand), where he owns a badge company and makes also badges and pins with the Le Grelle coat of arms. Fascinated by his homonym Edmond Le Grelle (1805–1876), he dedicated a site based on Google Earth to him, which is a virtual historical tour of the Antwerp locations of the Le Grelle family.

=== Count Matthieu Le Grelle (1982) ===
Count Matthieu Le Grelle is co-founder of Duo for a Job, an association that coordinates the sponsorship of young immigrants for employment. Hundreds of young people have been able to find a job through the association.

=== Countess Stéphanie Le Grelle (1983) ===
Daughter of Count Bernard J. Le Grelle (1947), Countess Stéphanie Le Grelle graduated in fashion design and model making from the Francisco Ferrer High School and was trained during her studies by the designer Kaat Tilley, the Belgian Flemish fashion designer, who dressed among others Diana Ross, Barbra Streisand, Naomi Campbell and Melanie Griffith. In 2005 she participated in the realization of the fashion show of Belgian stylist Pierre Gauthier, and worked with him for four years, training in the haute couture profession. Following this apprenticeship Stéphanie Le Grelle began to create her own designs. In 2007 she spent ten months doing humanitarian work in Saltillo, Mexico, where she introduced women from underprivileged Mexican neighborhoods to couture and fashion design. In 2011, she opened her own tailoring and tailored design workshop.

=== Countess Sophie Le Grelle (1987) ===
Multi-disciplinary, Sophie Le Grelle creates illustrations, GIFs, motifs and more, from print to social media, through plans for screenings of art shows and musical performances. While studying illustration in Brussels, Sophie focused on visual arts and illustration. For the past five years, she has been drawing projects inspired by the sensibilities of graphic design. Sophie Le Grelle manipulates the pattern and contrasting colors to create bold and playful images.

=== Countess Joséphine Le Grelle (2000) ===
Singer arrived in the final of the television show The Voice in 2017. "Josephine, who has returned from three years in Jordan, has made a big splash with the coaches thanks to her veiled timbre and a very moving rendition of James Bay's song Let it Go. The young woman has been singing since receiving her first guitar at the age of 8." (RTBF). " On her first Live, Josephine had offered a magical moment by taking over an Adele song, When We Were Young. For this eighth final, the girl chose to perform the very first title of the artist Tove Lo, a title that had been a real radio hit" (RTBF).

== Toponym ==
- In Antwerp: Legrellelei and Gérard Le Grellelaan
- In Gestel: Legrellestraat
- In Etterbeek: Charles-Le-Grelle's street
- In Jette: Stanislas-Le-grelle's street
- In Pulle nl: Legrellelei
- In Deurne: Tweegezusterslaan (The Two Sisters Lane in memory of Lydia and Alice Le Grelle, who died tragically)

== Botany ==
Several plants are named Le Grelle:

- Jacaranda legrelliana
- Punica granatum 'Legrelliae', dedicated by Mme Parmentier to Caroline Legrelle d'Hanis de Berchem
- Calathea legrelleana
- Agave legrelliana
- Karatas legrellae

== Alliances ==
Agie de Selsaeten family

Anne de Molina family

D'Arschot Schoonhoven family

Audren de Kerdrel family

Beeckmans de West-Meerbeeck family

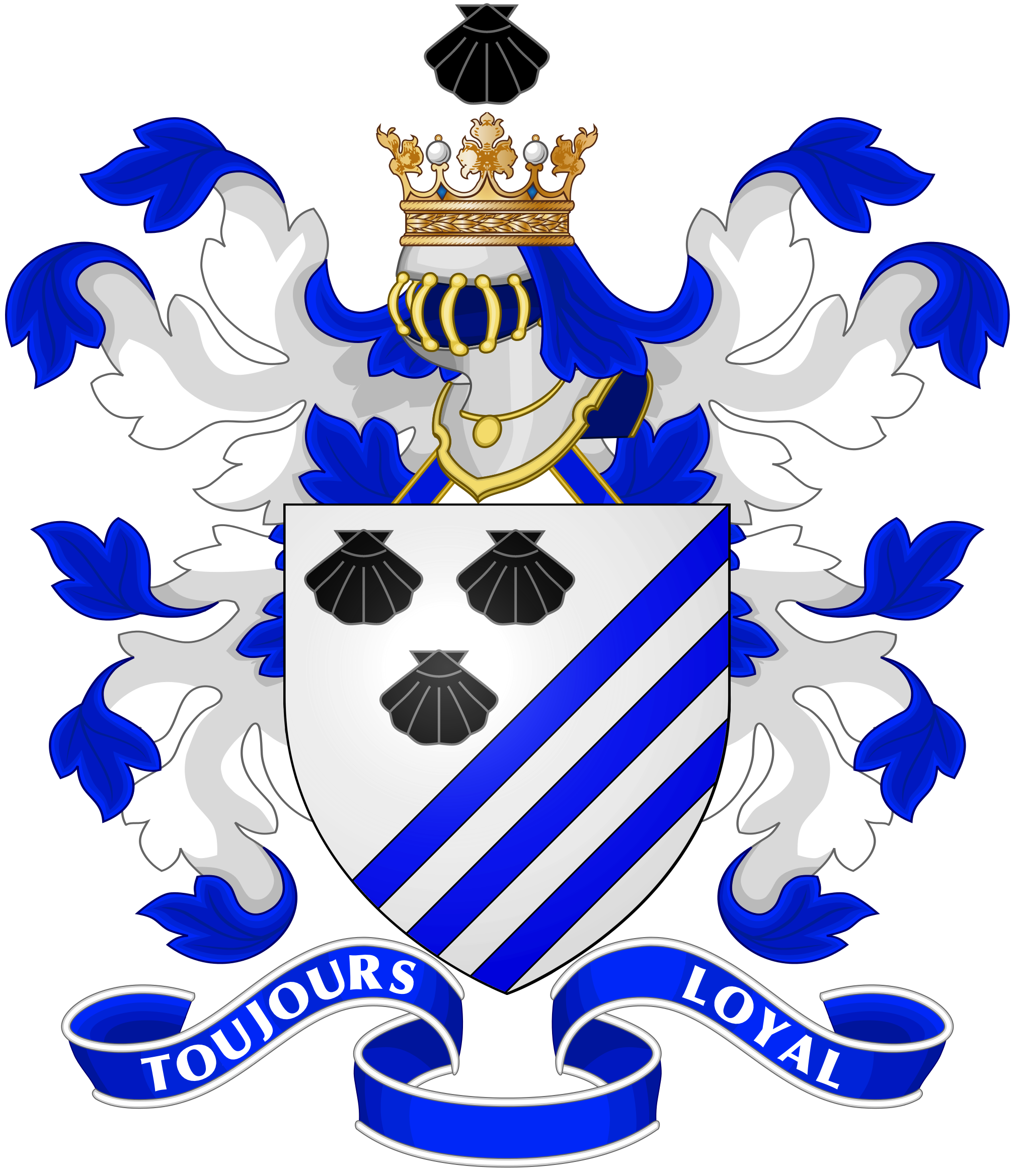
Begasse de Dhaem family

Van der Beken Pasteel family

De Bernard de Fauconval family

De Bieberstein Rogalla Zawadasky family

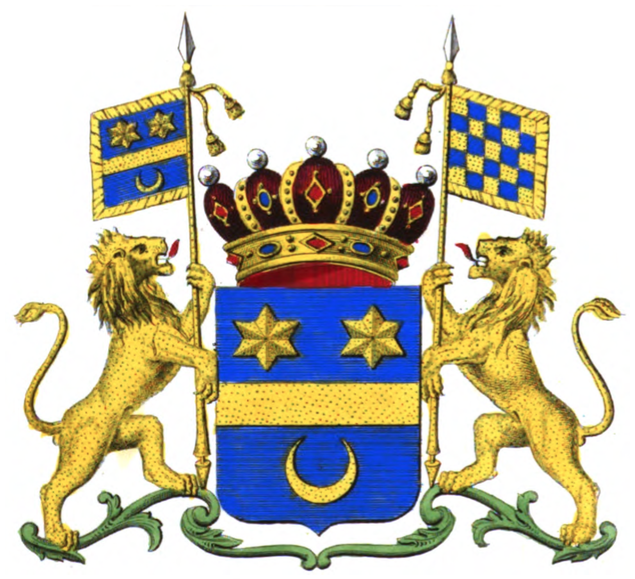
Bonaert family

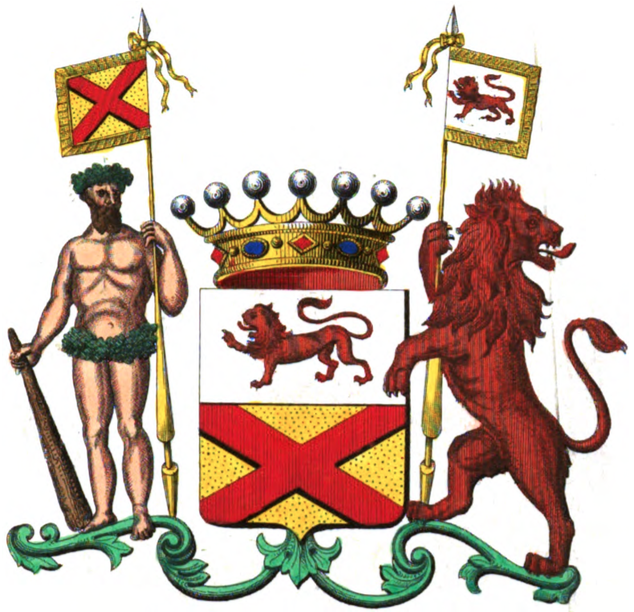
De Bonhome family

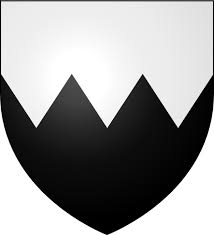
Du Bois de Maquillé family

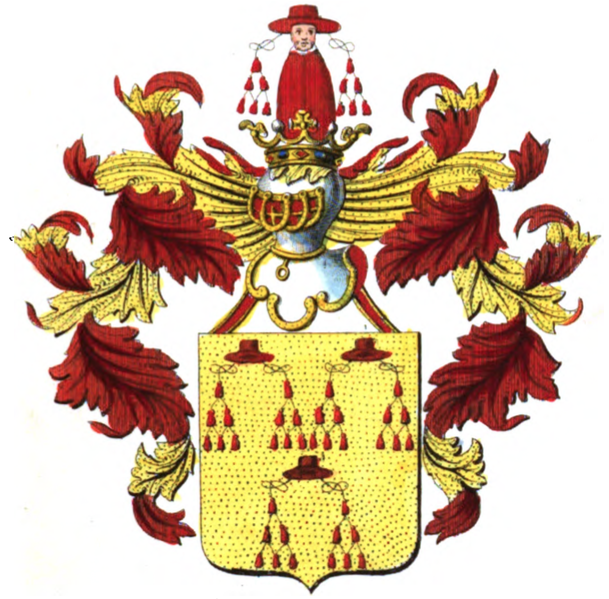
De Borman family

Van den Branden de Reeth family

De Brouchoven de Bergeyck family

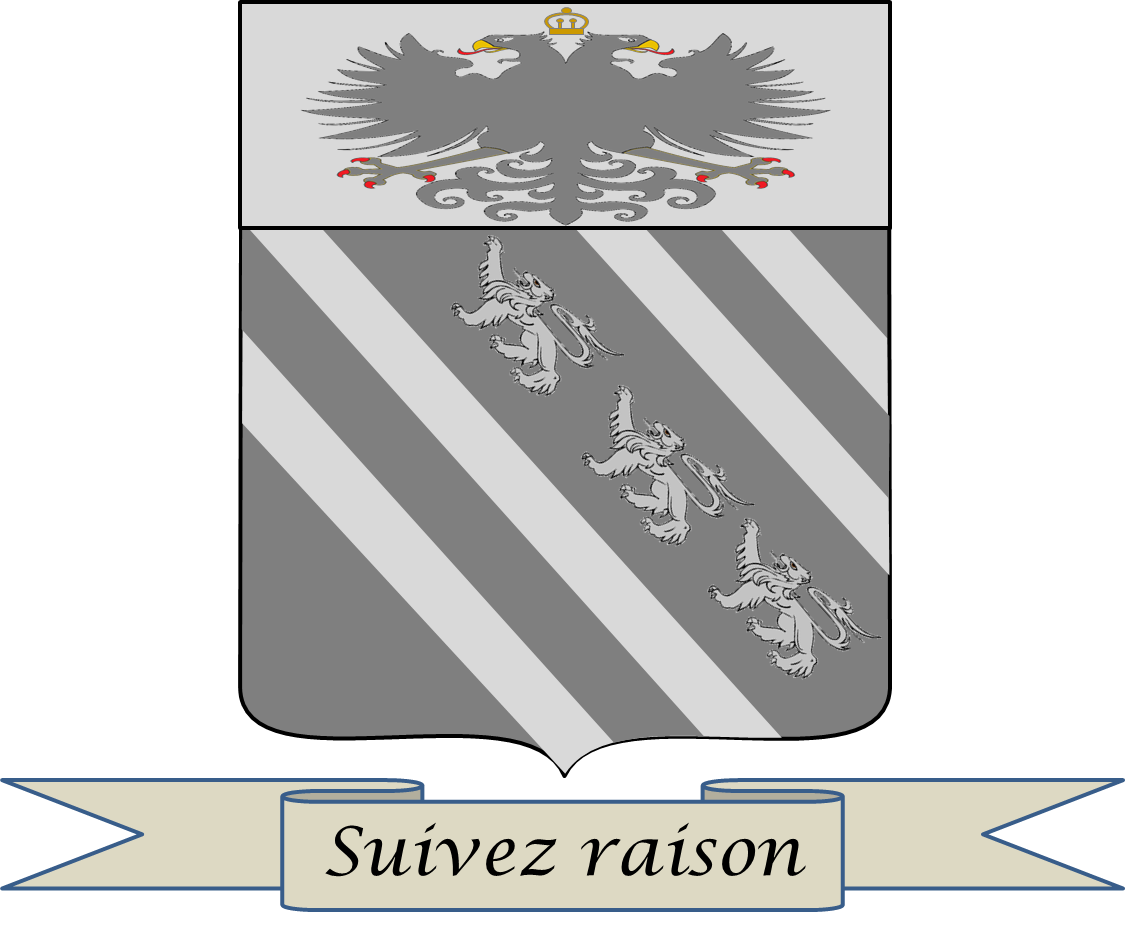
De Browne family

De Burbure de Wesembeek family

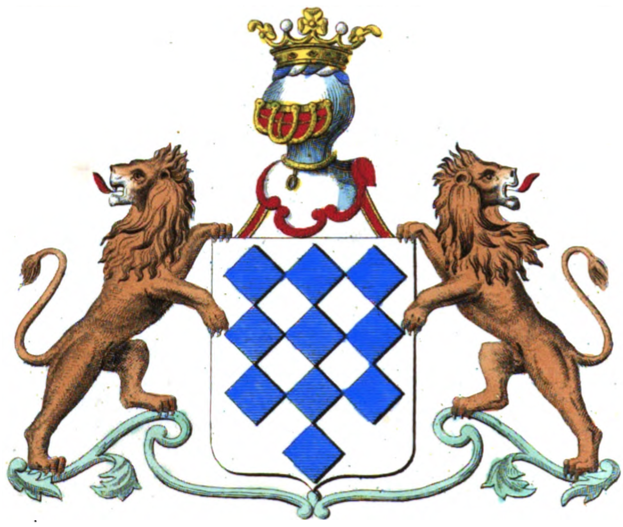
De Cartier d'Yves family

Cogels family

De David family

Didisheim family

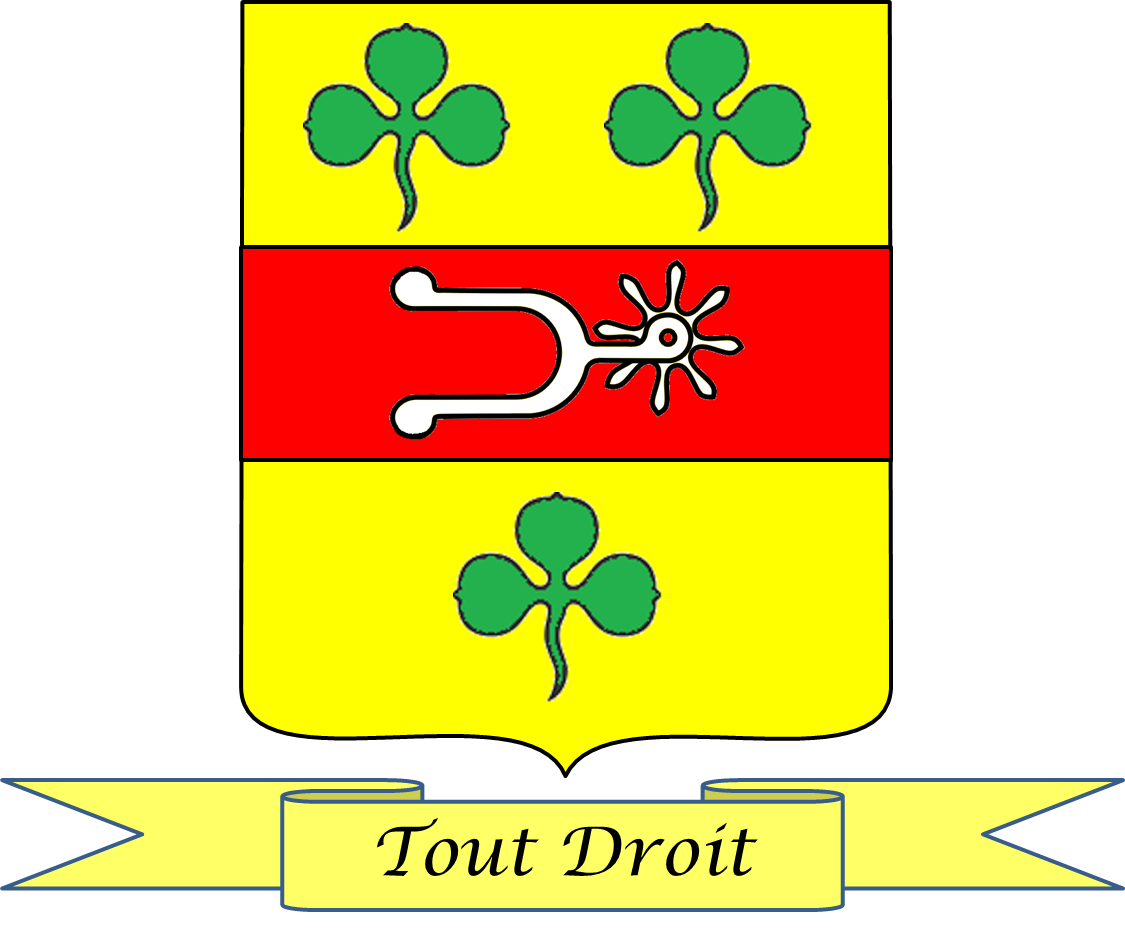
Dumont de Chassart family

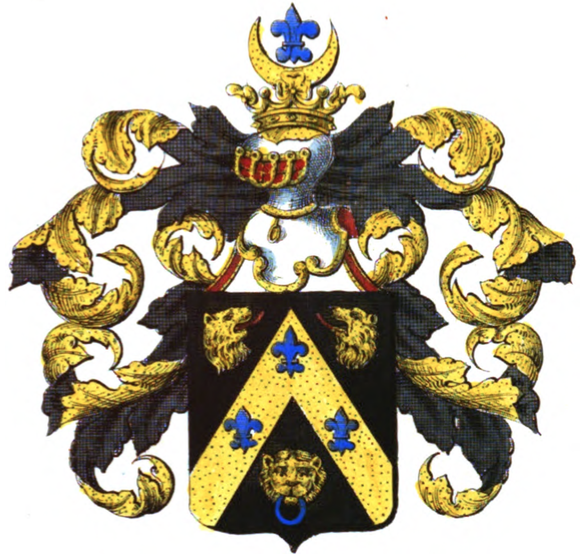
Della Faille de Leverghem family

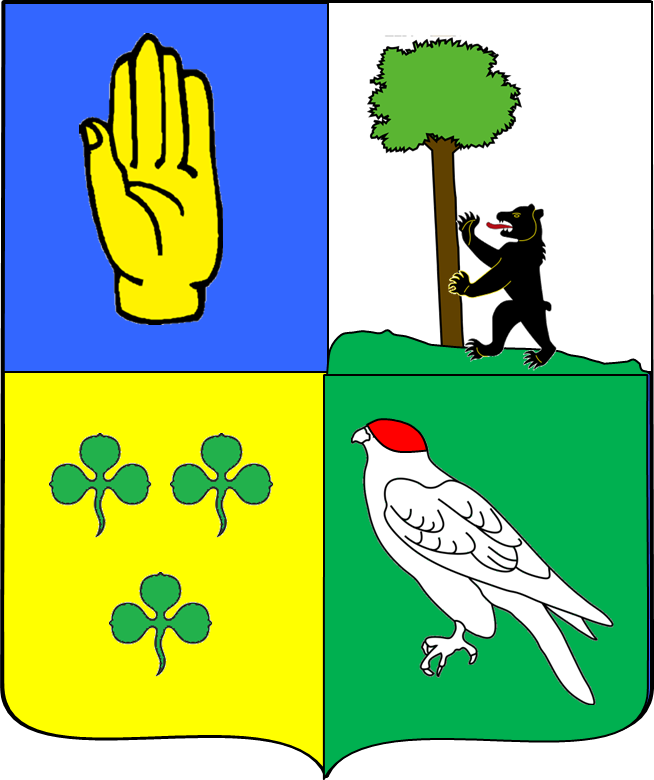
Geelhand de Merxem family

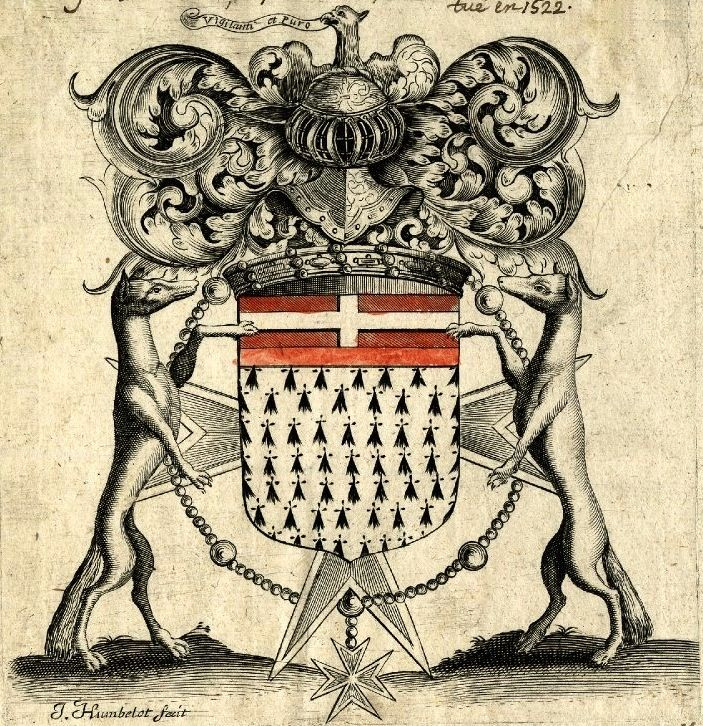
Goussencourt family

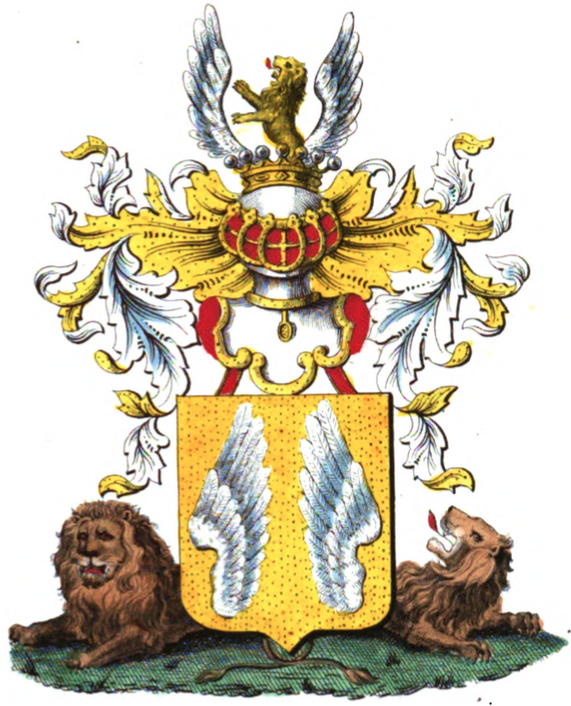
De Gruben family

Guyot family

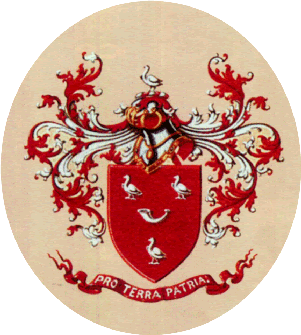
Halleux family

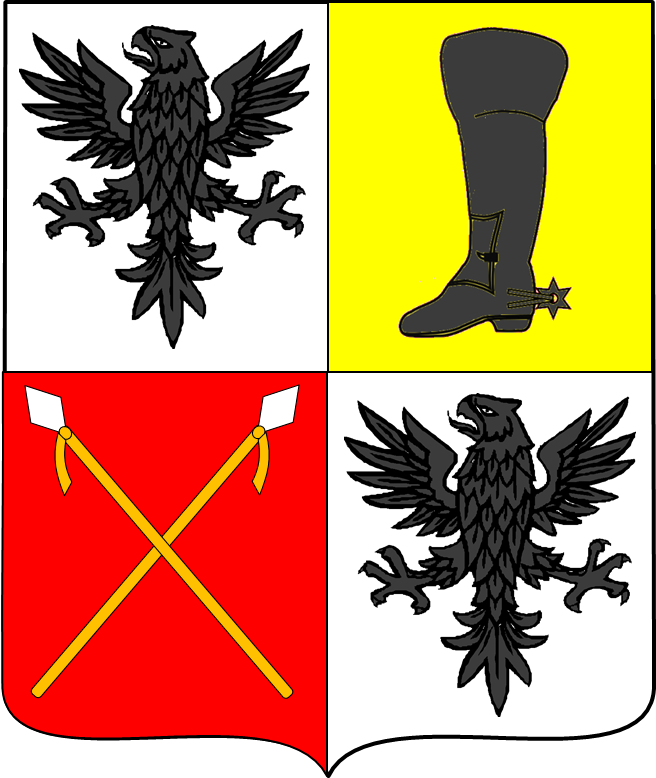
De Harlez de Deulin family

De Hemptinne family

Henry de Frahan family

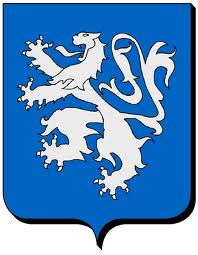
Hersart family

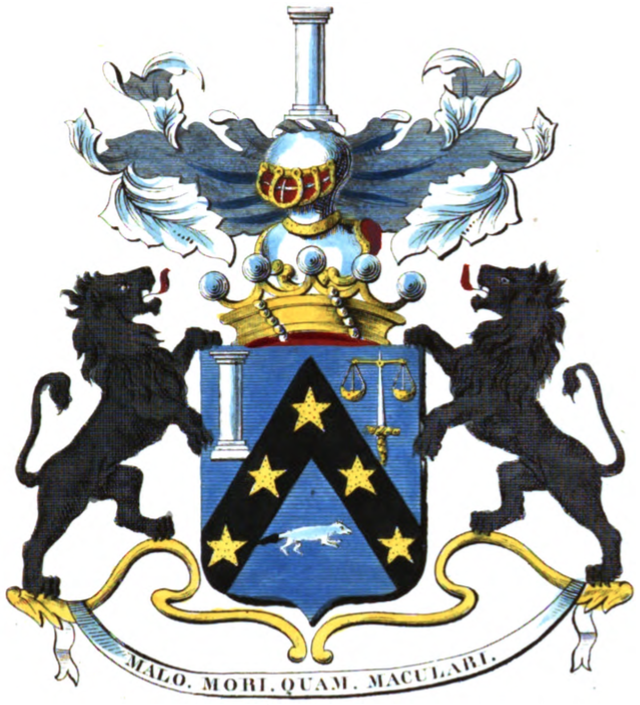
Holvoet family

Houtart family

Van Hövell tot Westerflier family

Janssens de Varebeke family

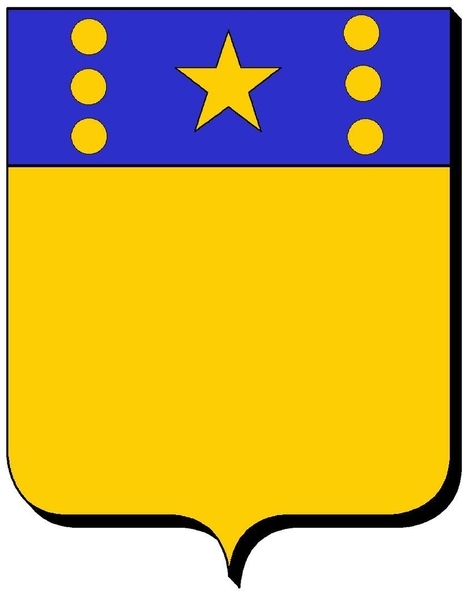
Van de Kerchove family

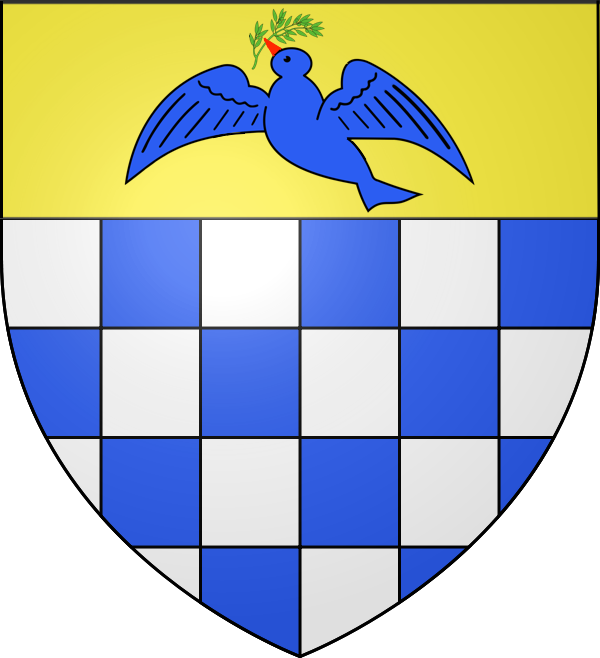
De Kerchove d'Exaerde family

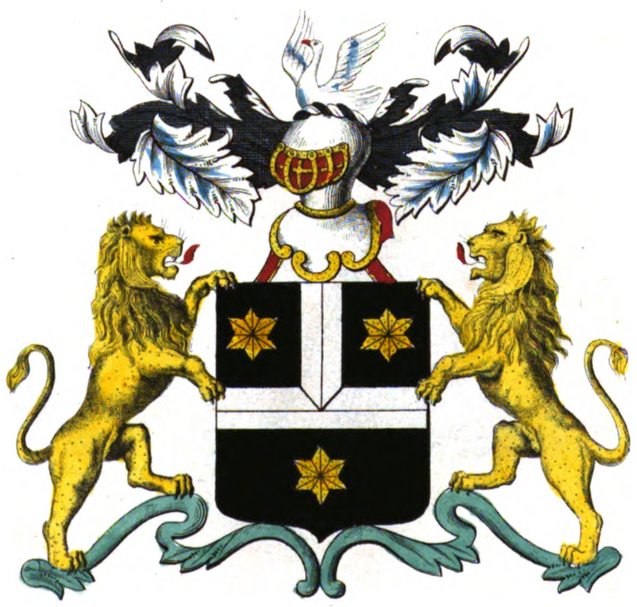
De la Kethulle de Ryhove family

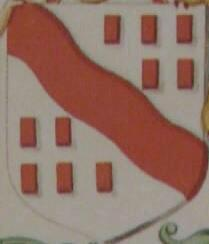
T'Kint de Roodenbeke family

De Laguarigue de Survilliers family

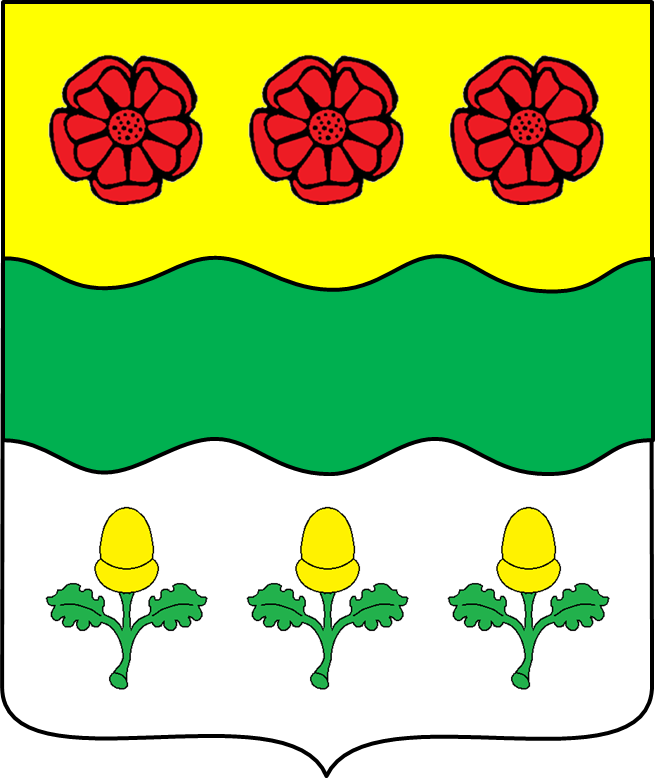
De Laminne de Bex family

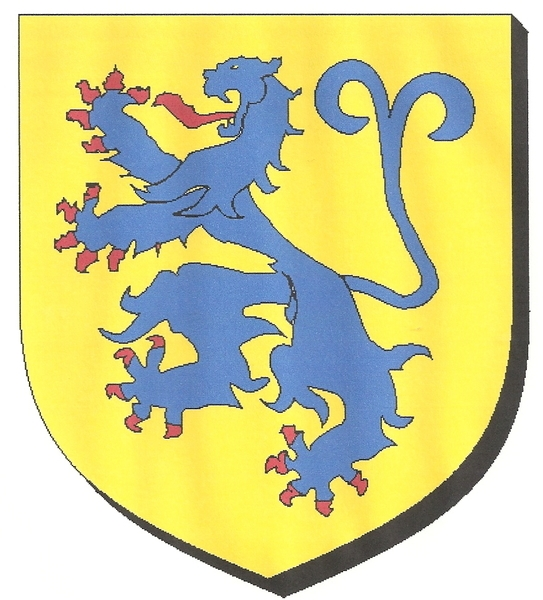
De Lestang-Parade family

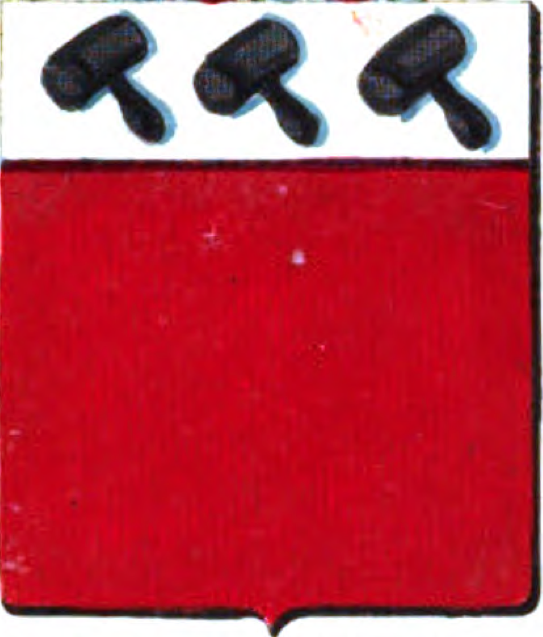
Van der Linden d'Hooghvorst family

De Macar family

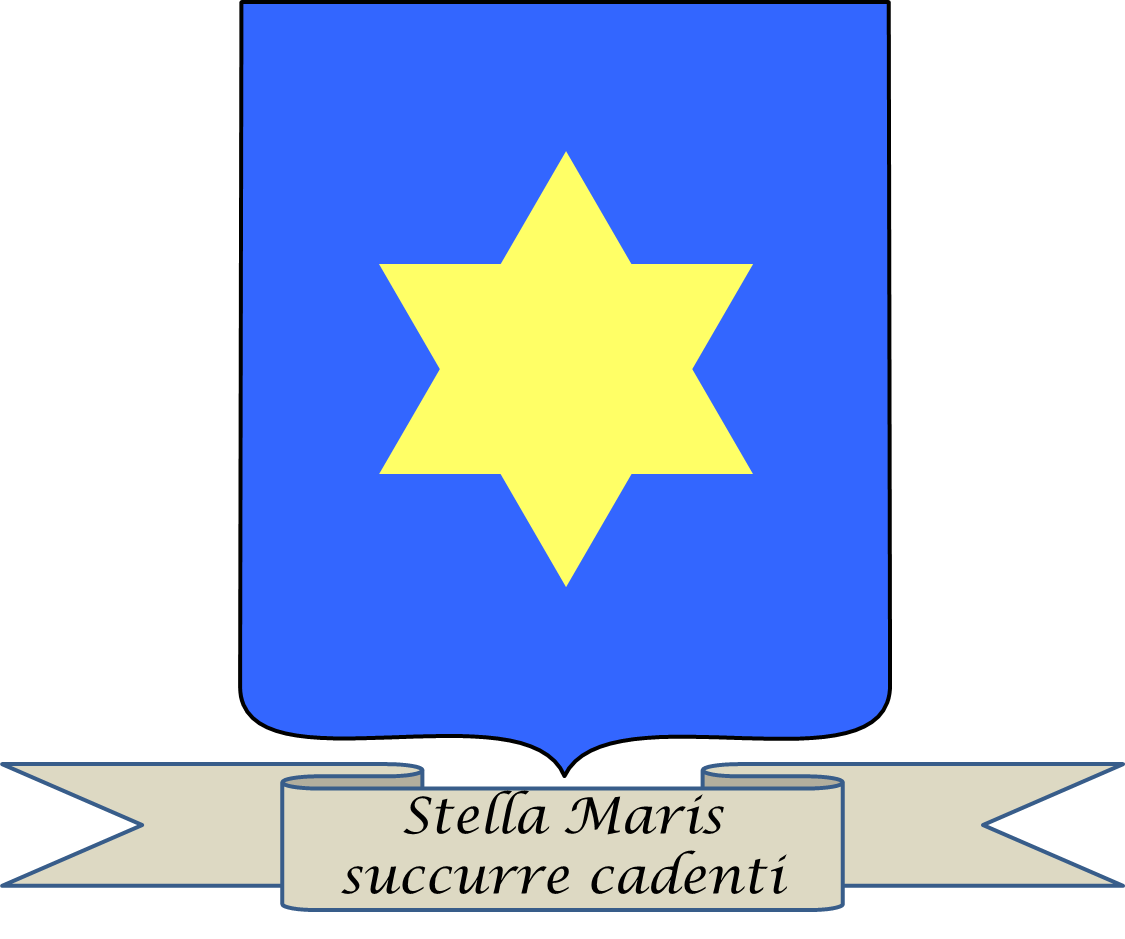
De Maere d'Aertrycke family

De Mahieu family

De Meester family

De Meeûs d'Argenteuil family

Moens de Hase family

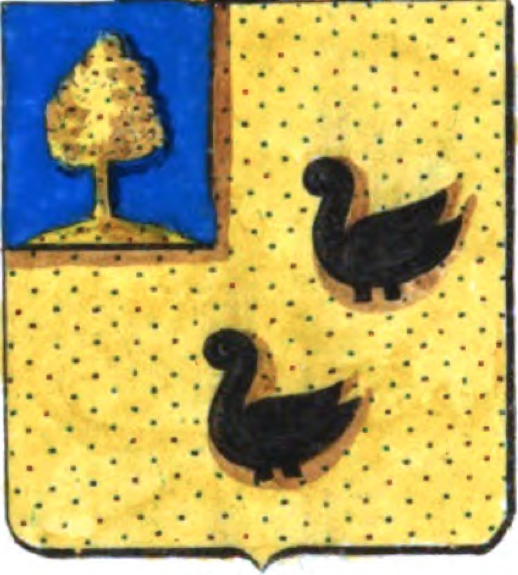
Mols family

Moretus family

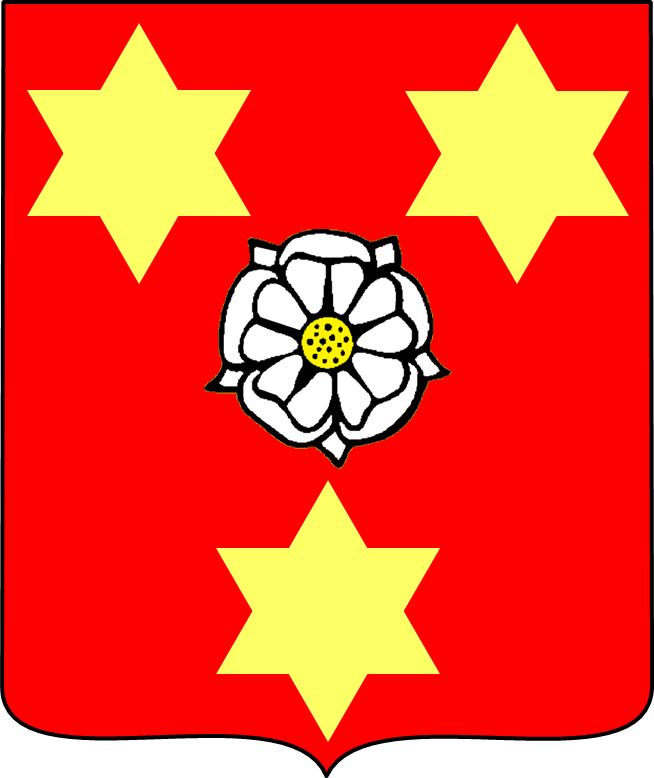
De Oldenhove de Guertechin family

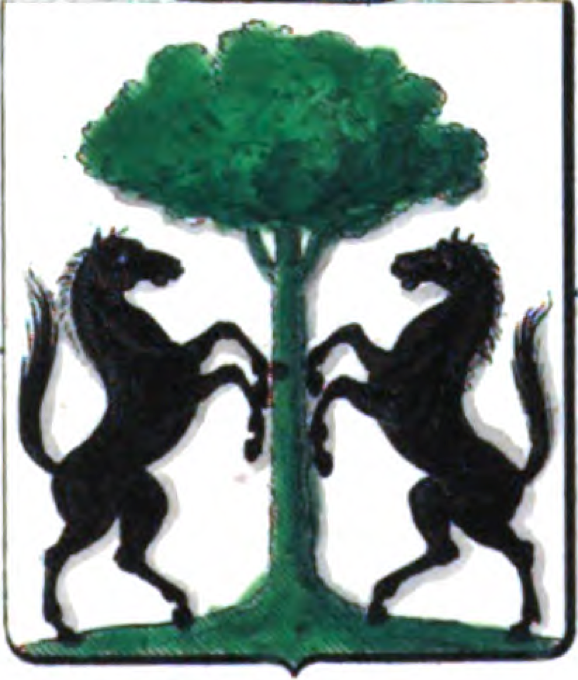
Osy de Zegwaart family

Van Outryve d'Ydewalle family

Peers de Nieuwburgh family

Famille Préveraud de Vaumas family

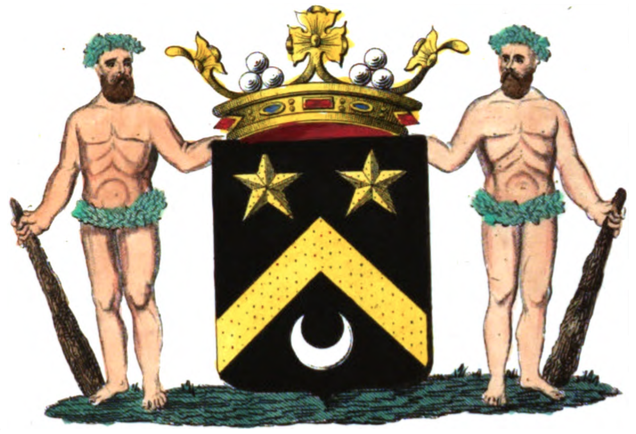
Famille de Radiguès de Chennevière family

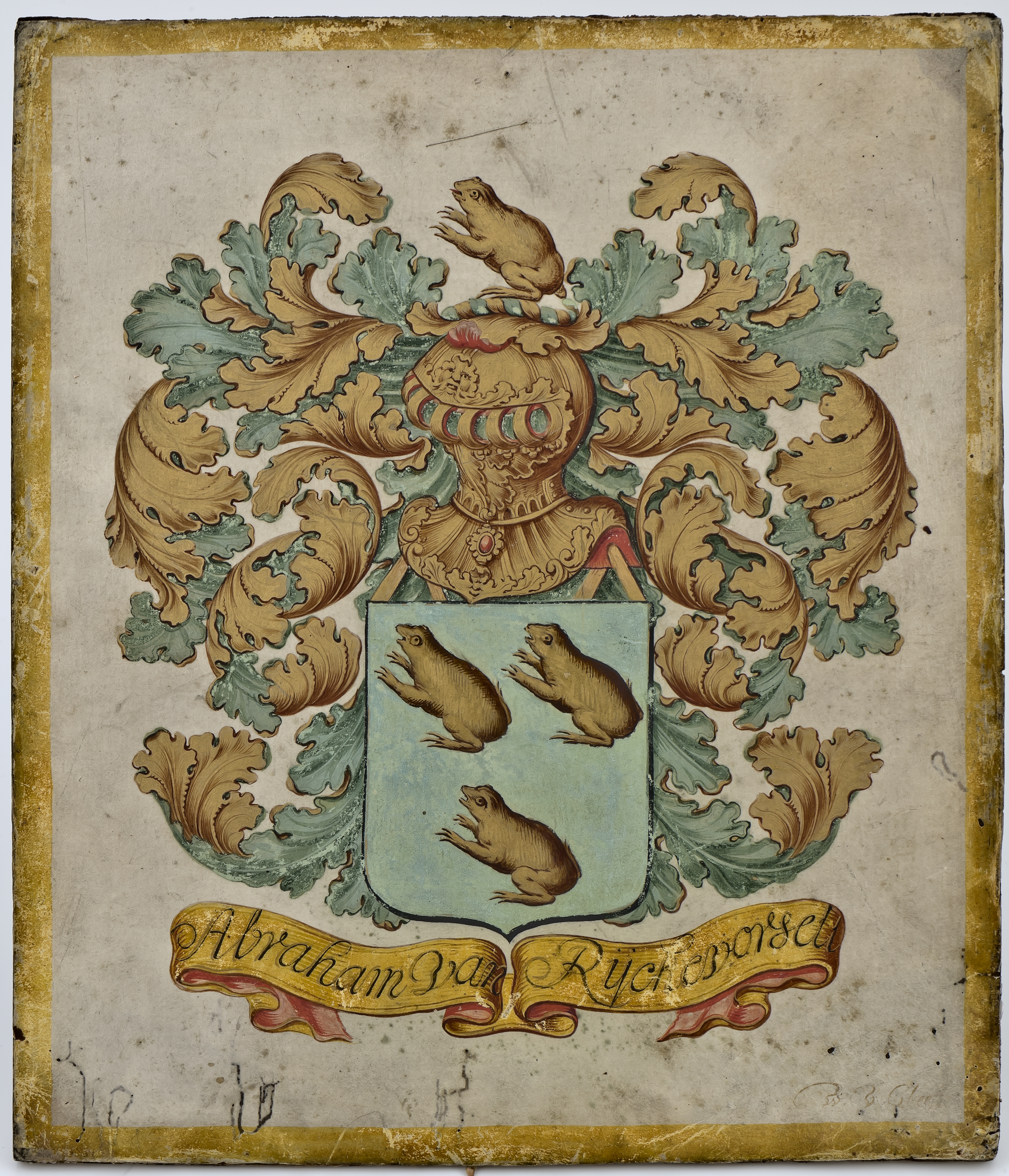
Van Rijckevorsel family

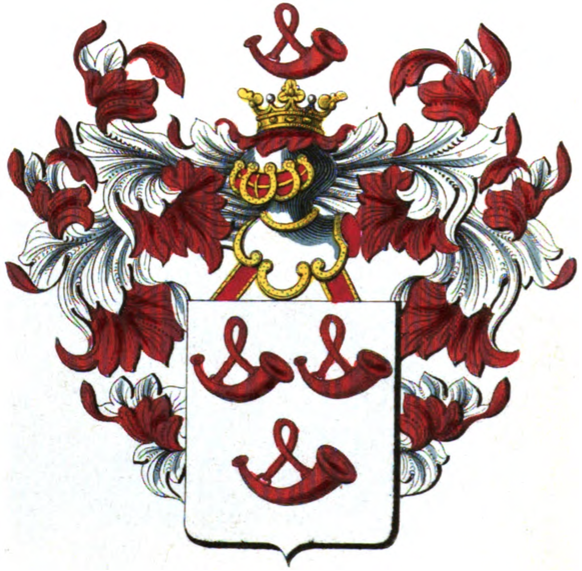
Roberti de Winghe family

De Robiano family

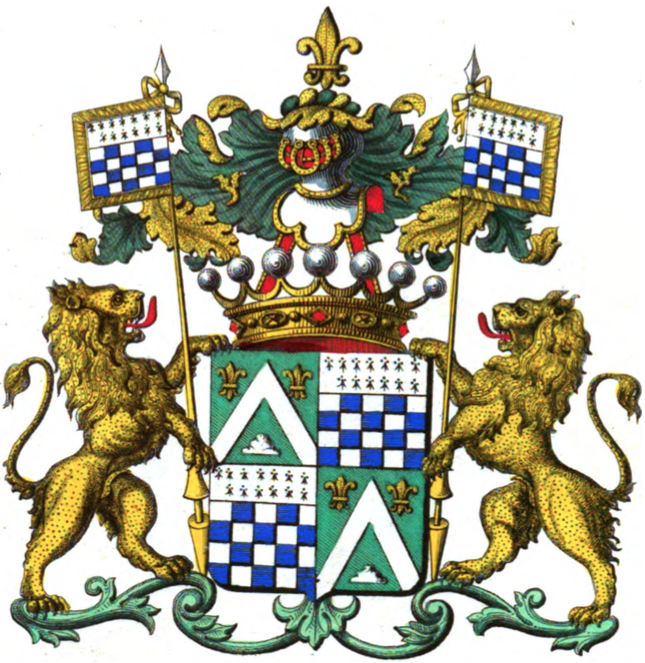
Rotsart de Hertaing family

De Sadeleer family

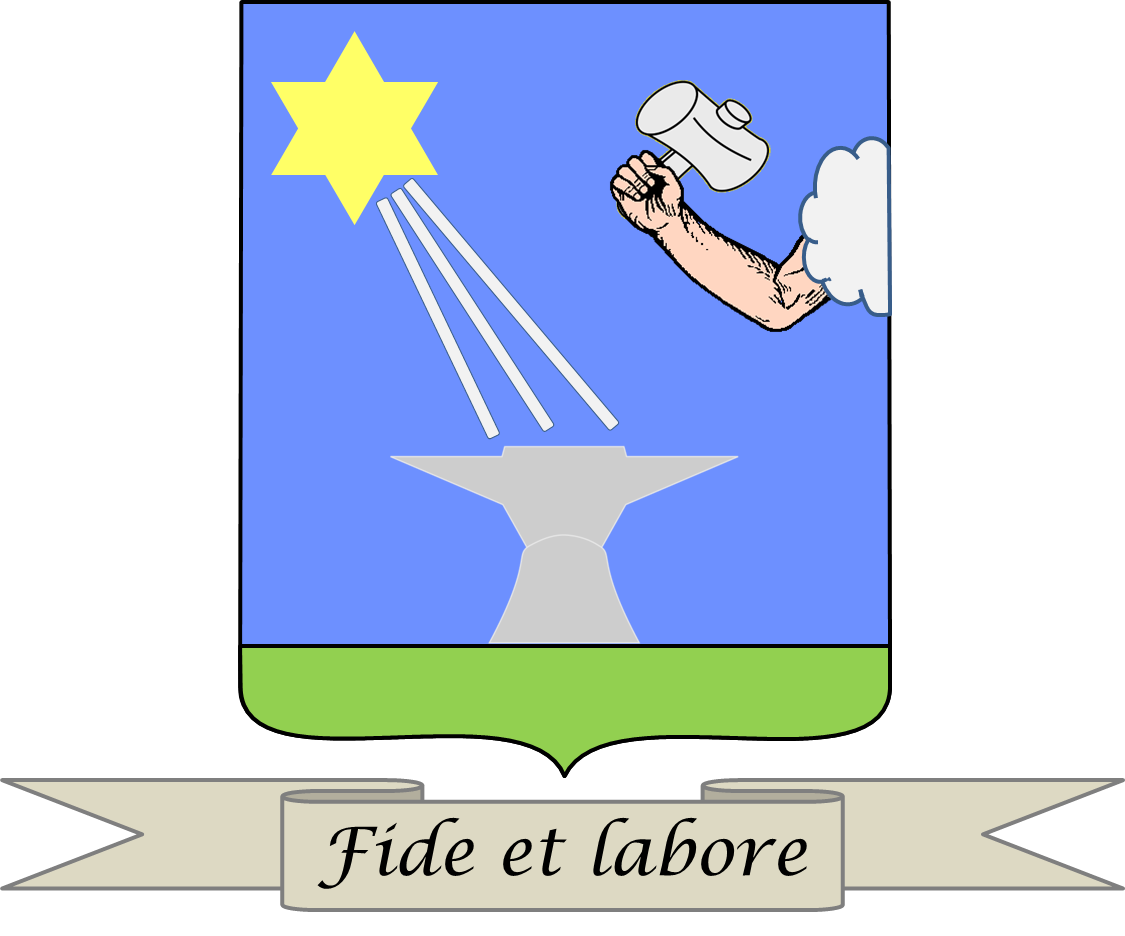
De Smet d'Olbecke family

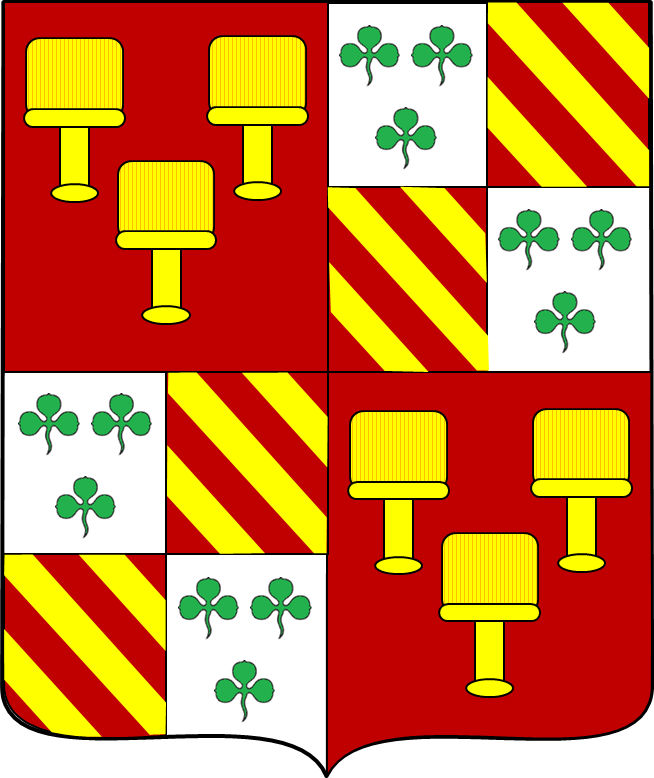
De Smet de Naeyer family

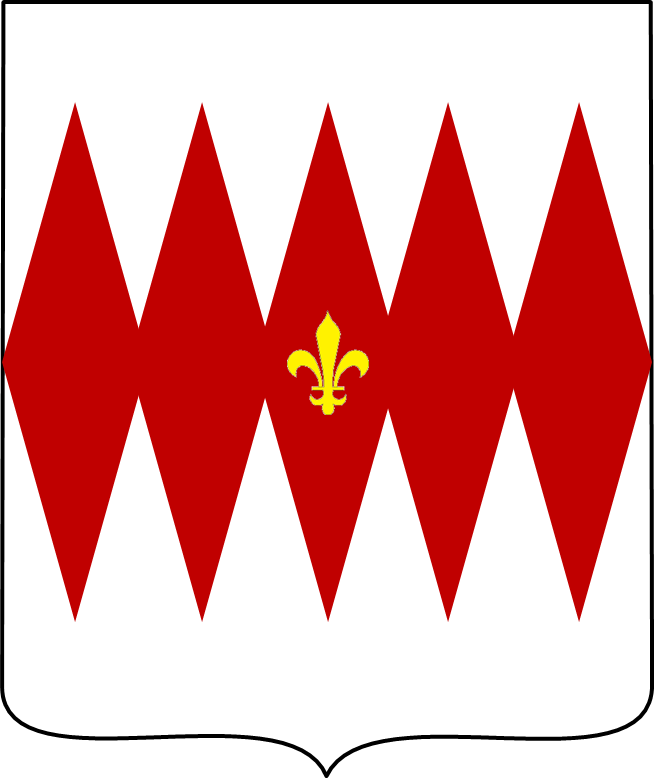
De Traux de Wardin family

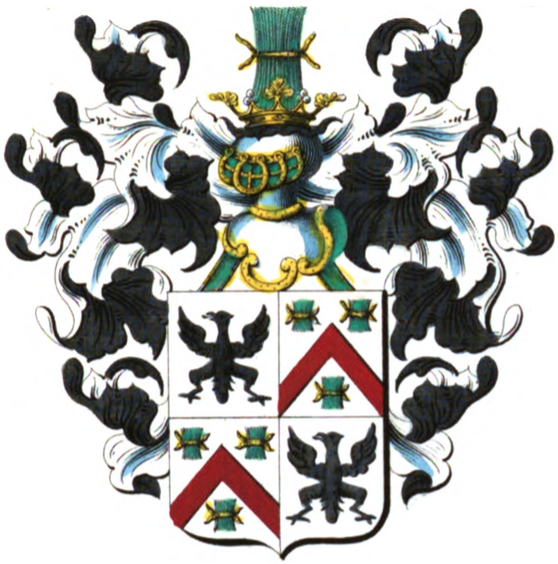
Ullens de Schooten family

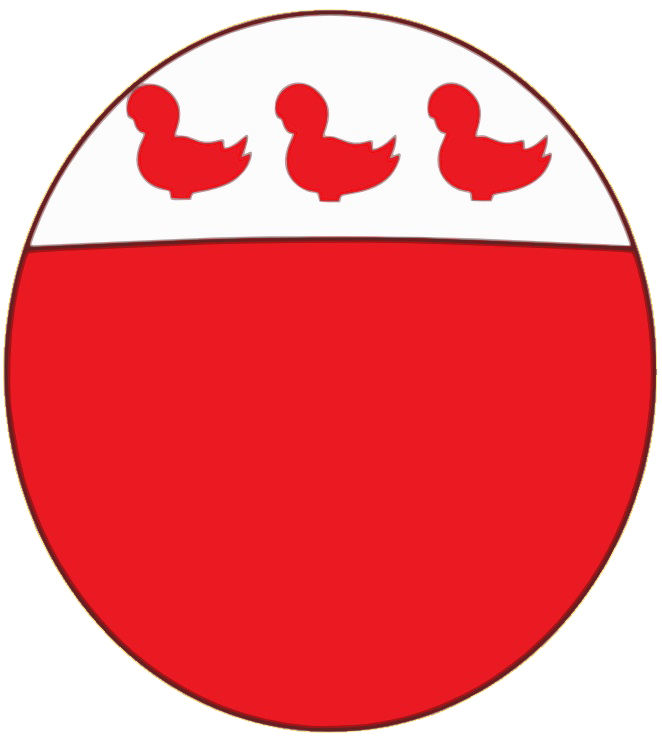
D'Ursel family

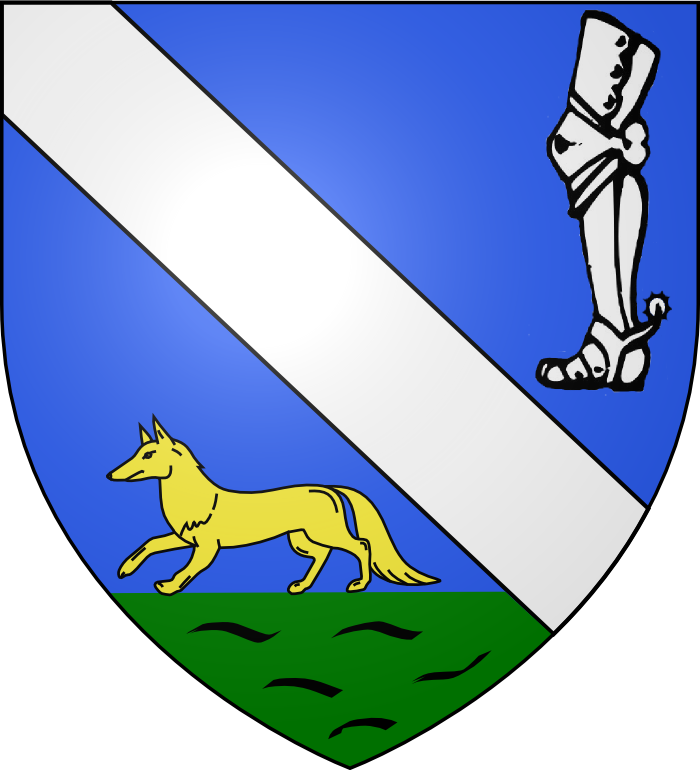
De Verhaegen family

De Vicq de Cumptich family

Vilain XIIII family

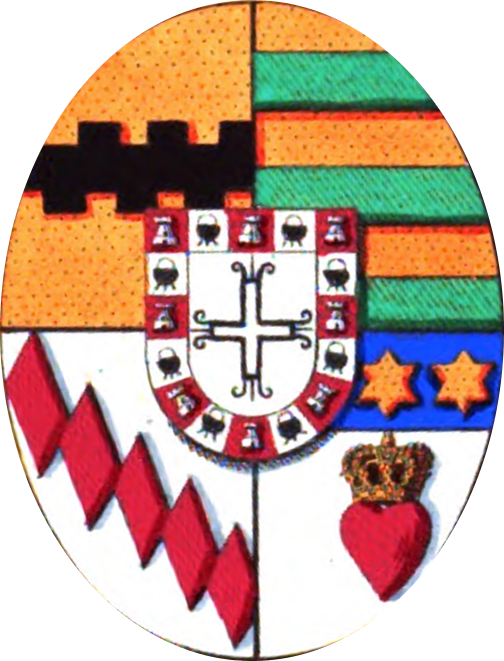
De Villegas de Saint-Pierre Jette family

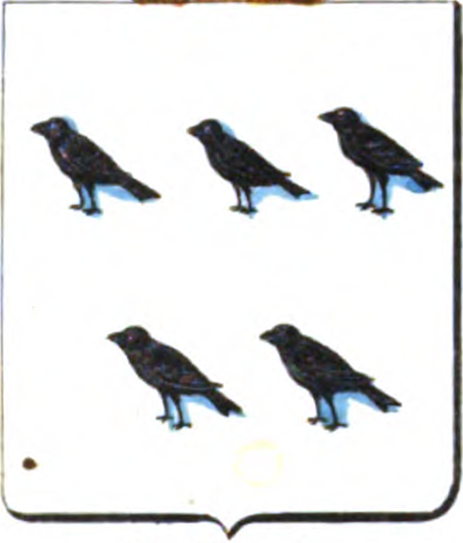
De Vinck de Winnezeele family

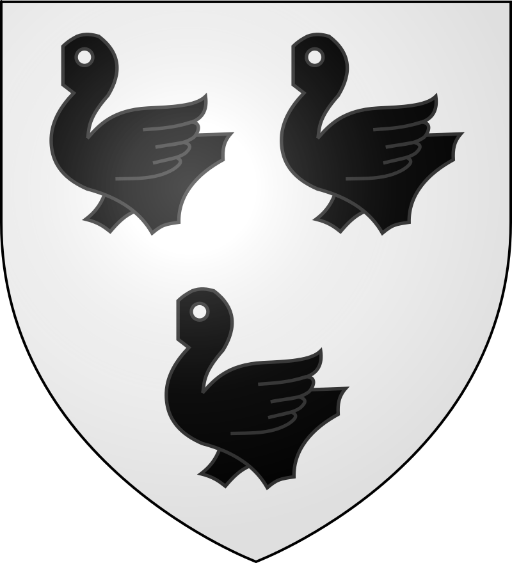
De Wael family

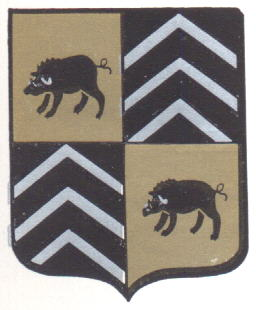
Van de Werve de Schilde family

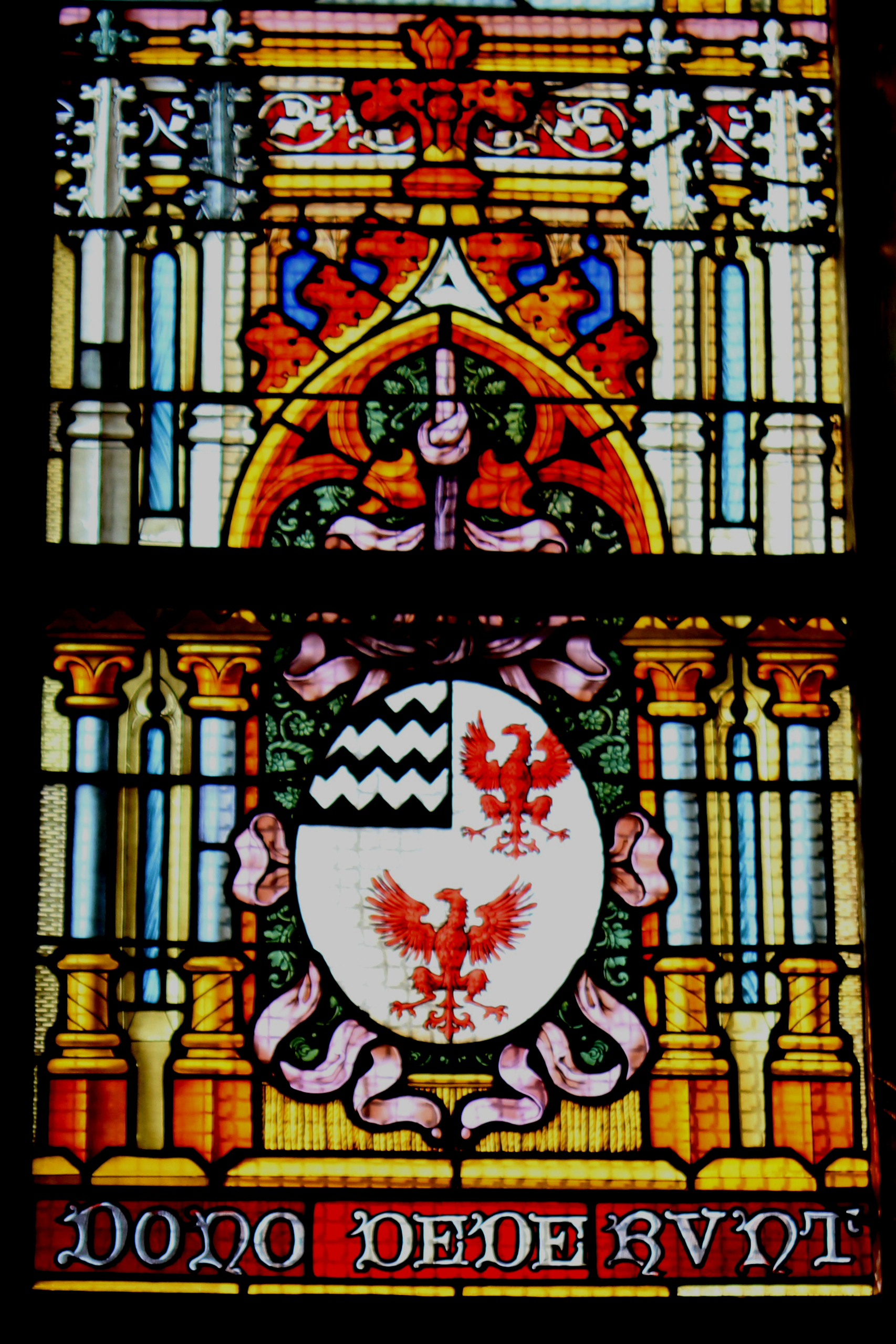
De Wijs family (coat of arms of the de Wijs family in the stained glass window at s'Hertogenbosch cathedral)

De Wouters de Bouchout family

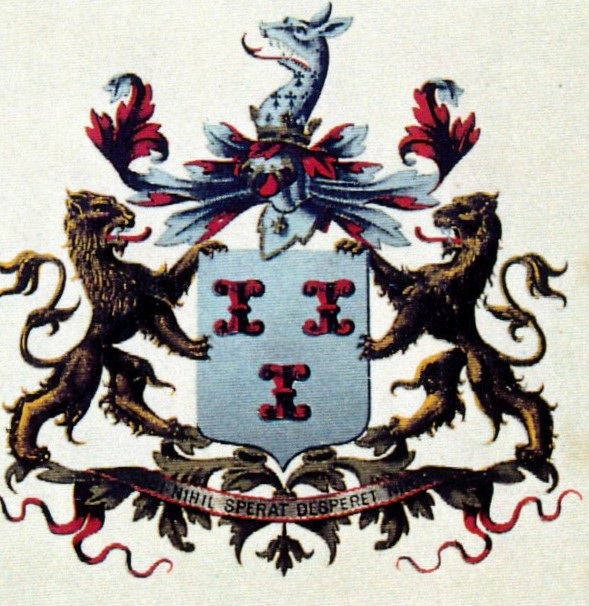
Van Zuylen family

And also families : Bracht, Bréart de Boisanger, de Broëta, de Cannart d'Hamale, de Cock de Rameyen, de la Croix d'Ogimont, van Delft, D'hanis, Donnet, Friling, Gelhé de Beaulieu, Goethals, Hug de Larauze, le Jeune d'Allegeershecque, Jolly, du Lac, Le Gros d'Incourt, Le Pilleur de Brevannes, Massange de Collombs, de Massol de Rebetz, de Melotte de Lavaux, Michel de Pierredon, Pety de Thozée, Pichelin de Villalonga, de Pierpont, van Pottelsberghe de la Potterie, de Potter de Ten Broeck, van de Put, Rotsart de Hertaing, de San, le Sergeant d'Hendecourt, Solvyns, de Villers du Fourneau, Wahis, Waucquez et Werbrouck.

== Gallery ==
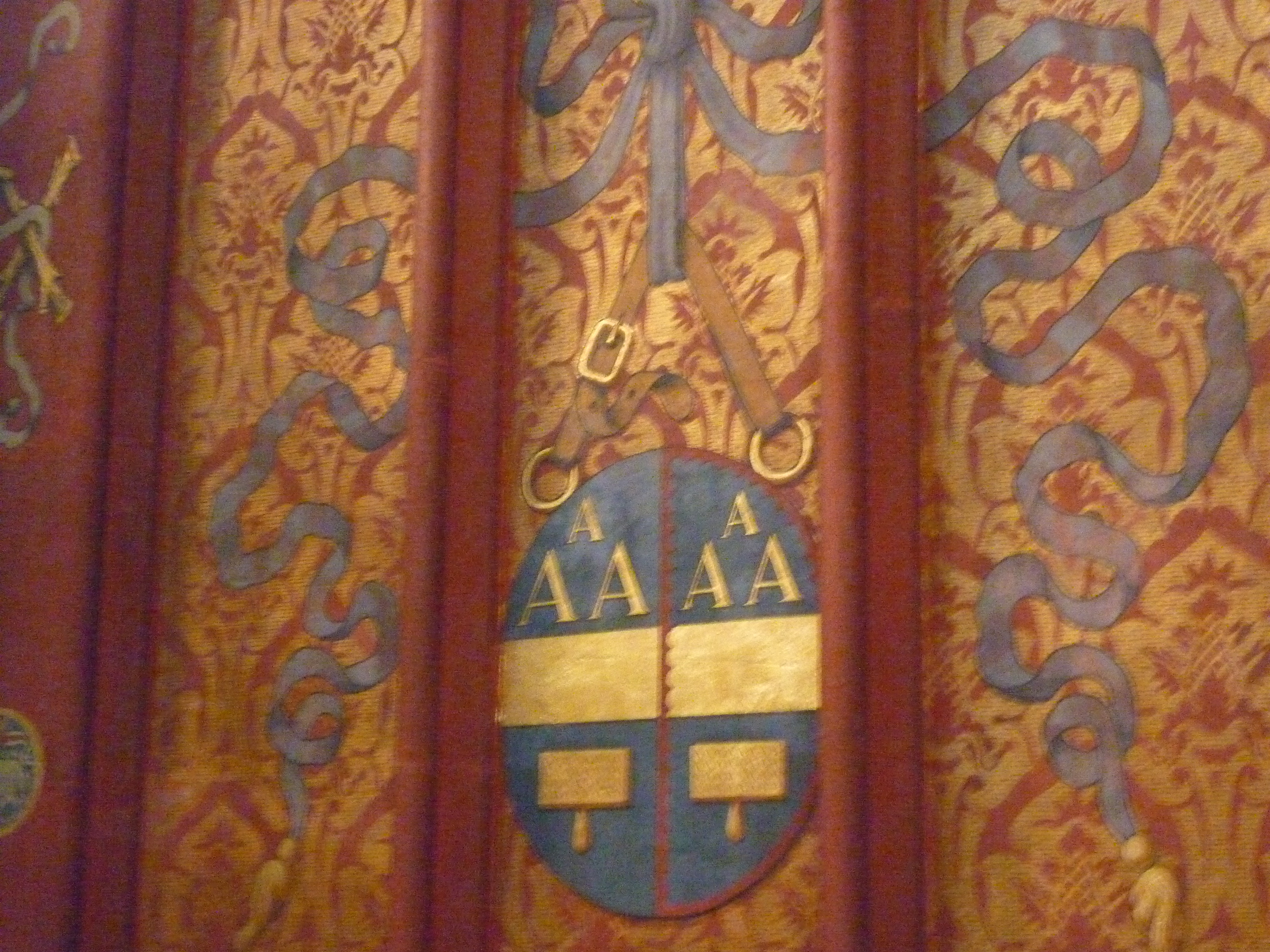
Coat of Arms of Julie Le Grelle in the Cathedral of Our Lady (Antwerp)

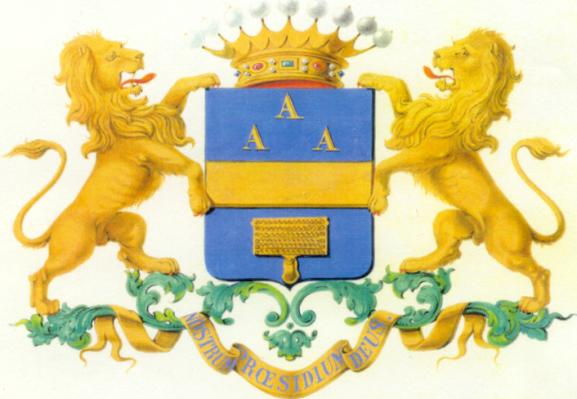
Coat of Arms of the Le Grelle family

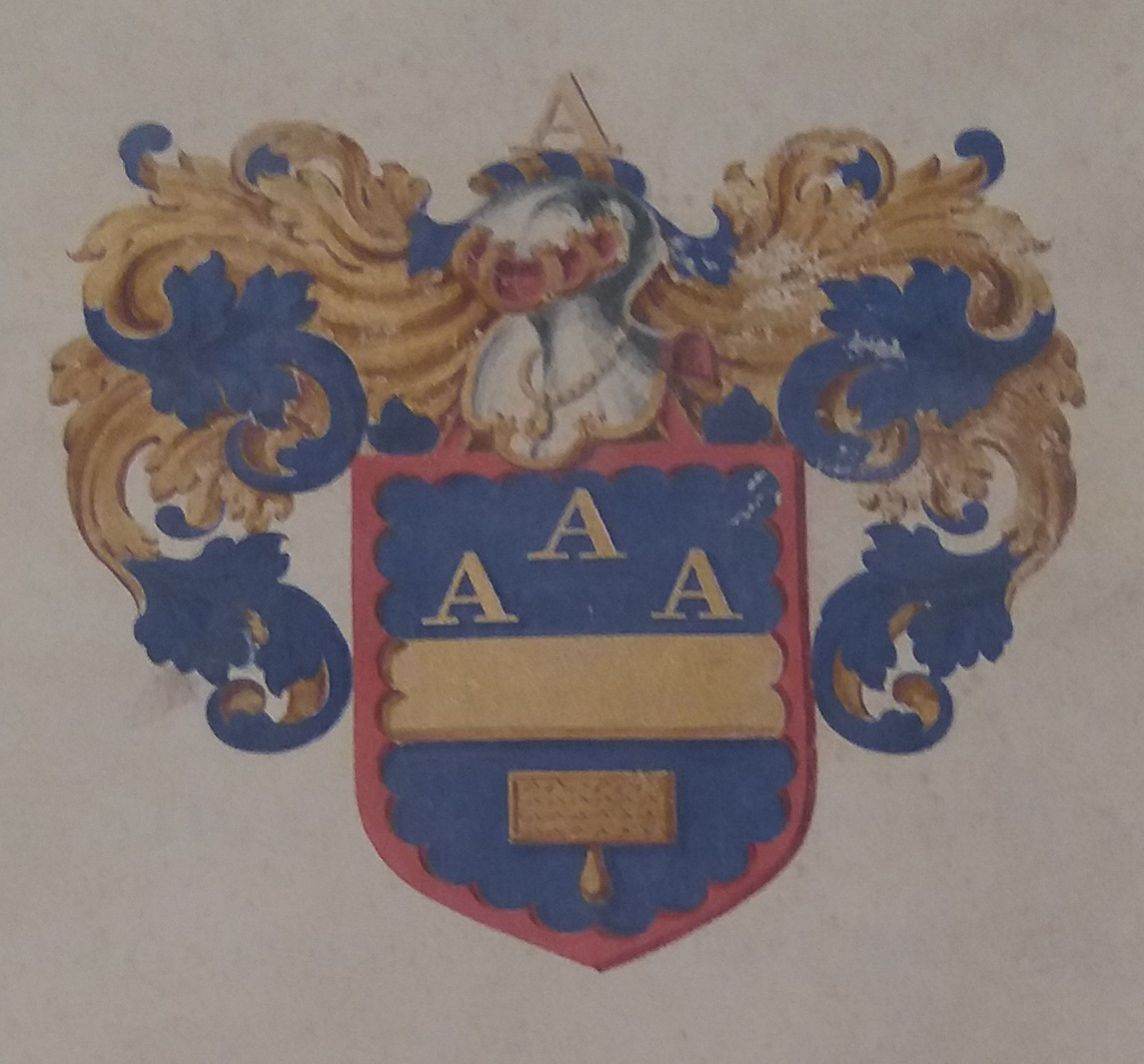
Coat of Arms in the Arms of the letters patent of the Le Grelle de Rameyen

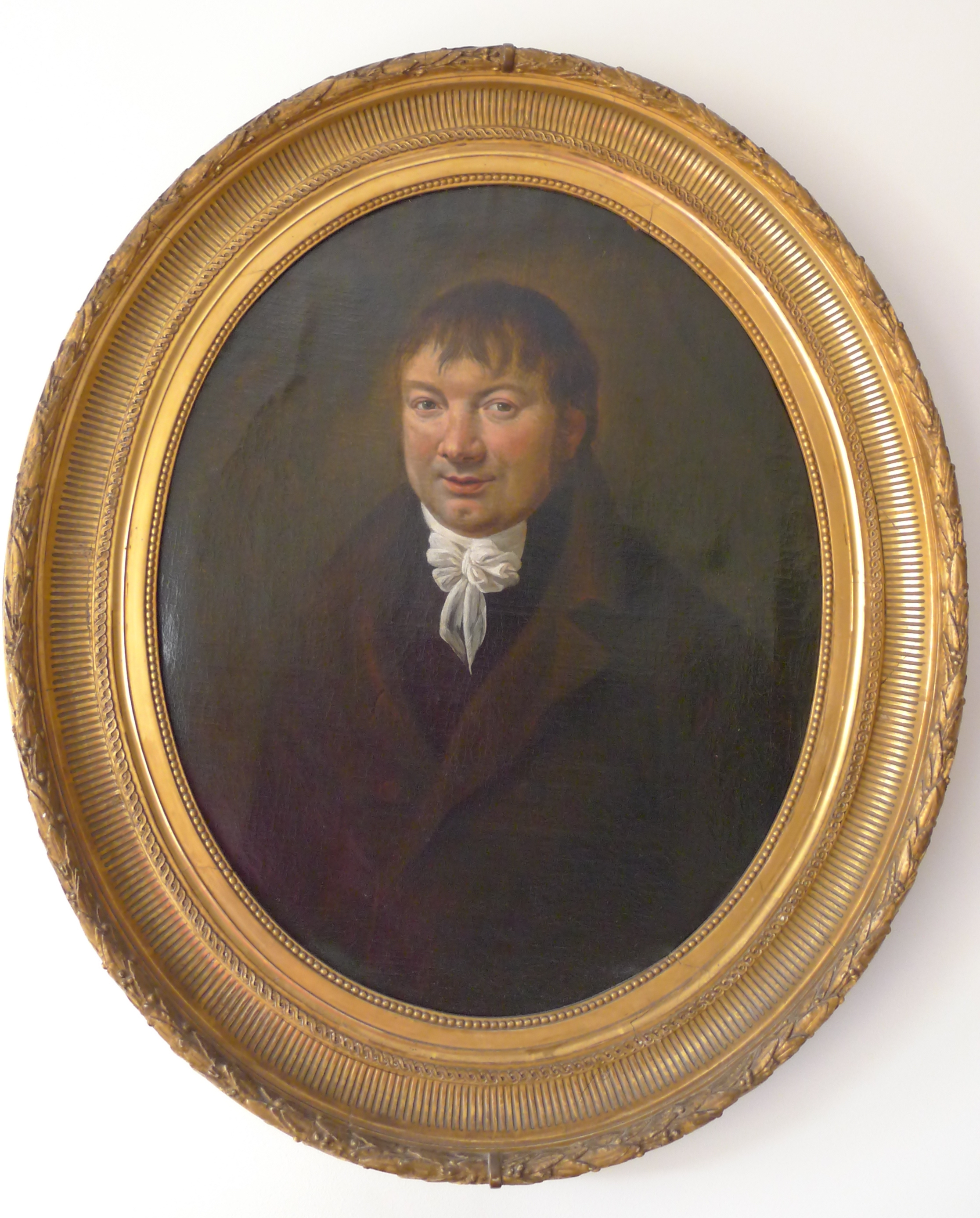
Guillaume Le Grelle (1767–1820)

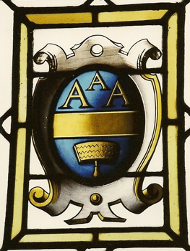
Le Grelle Coat of Arms in the City Hall of Antwerp. Until the beginning of the 20th century, the mayors received their armored stained glass window at the town hall.

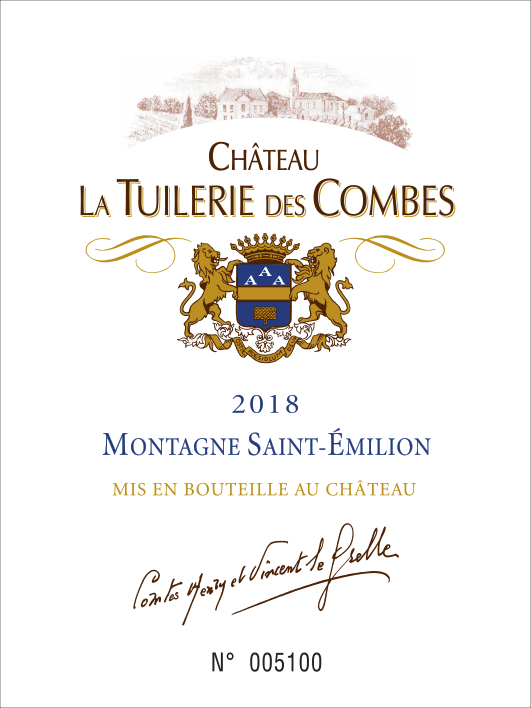
Montagne Saint-Emilion 2018 label

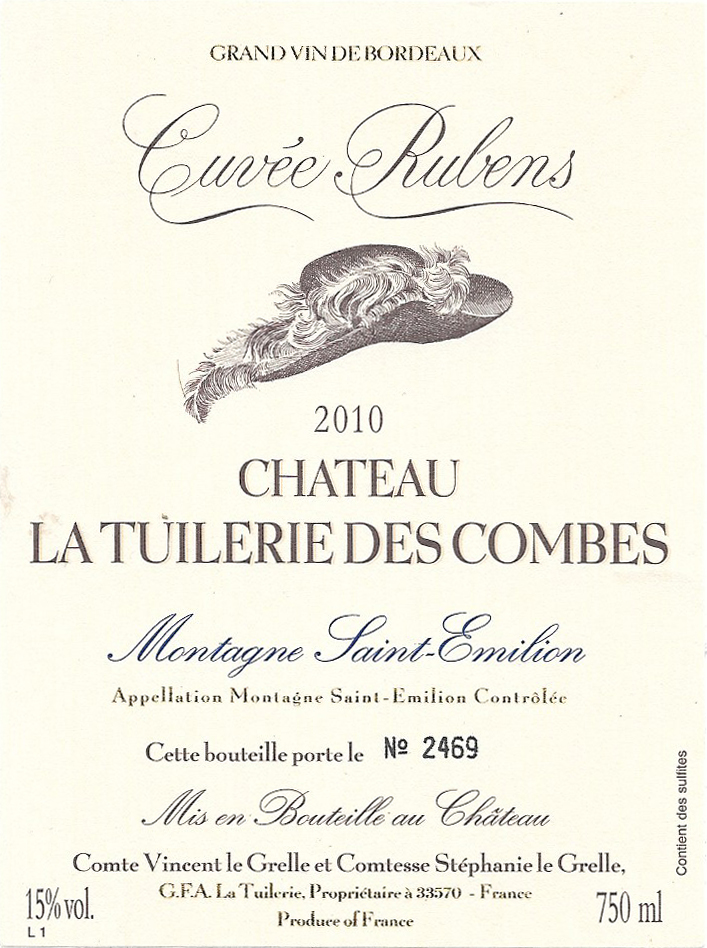
Cuvée Rubens Montagne Saint-Emilion - La Tuilerie des Combes Castle. On the label the hat of Helena Fourment, the second wife of Rubens, is drawn.

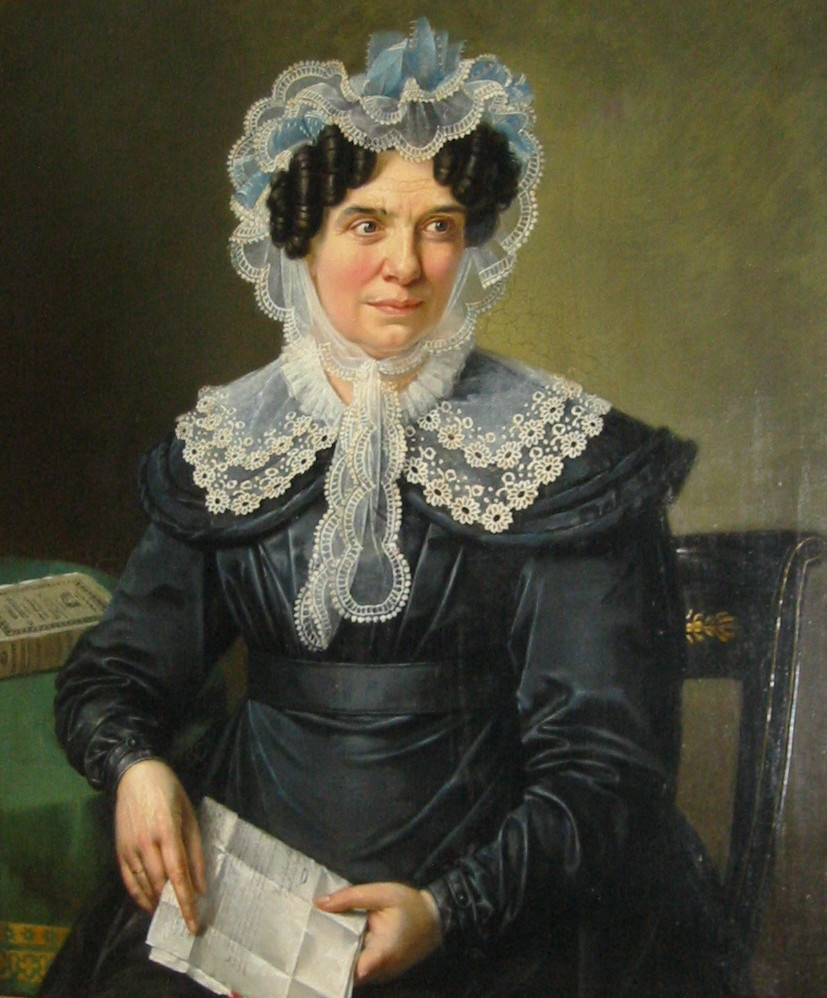
Marie Thérèse Cambier, widow of Joseph J. Le Grelle, painted by Barthélemy Vieillevoye in 1826. Mme Le Grelle holds in her hands a signed letter: "your devoted son Gerard Le Grelle". This is the oldest painting of Le Grelle direct ancestors.

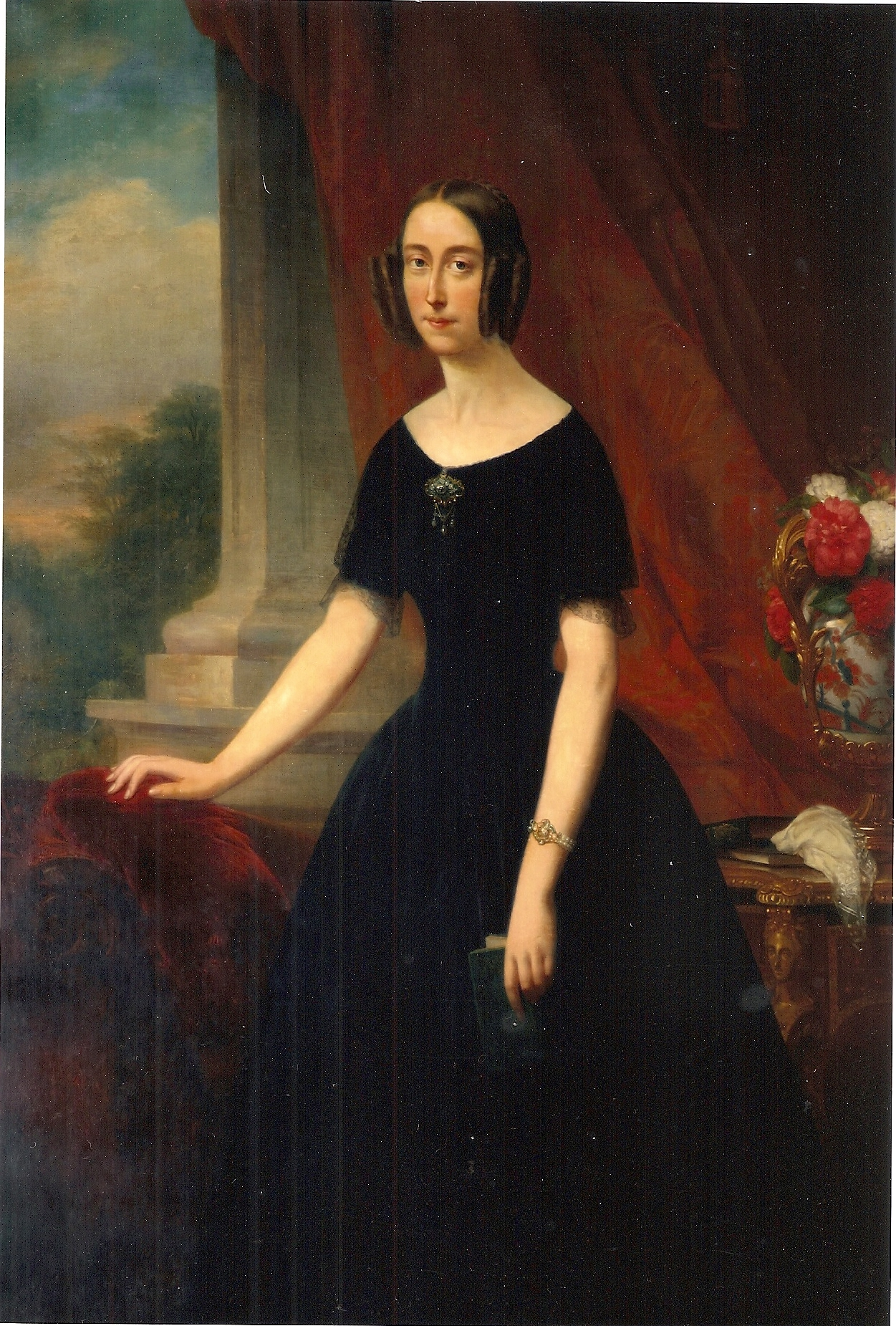
Eulalie Cambier, niece of Marie Thérèse, first wife of Edmond Le Grelle, founder of the Ursuline school in Wilrijk in 1854, painting painted in 1847 by Nicaise De Keyser, the painter who benefited from the patronage of Gérard Le Grelle

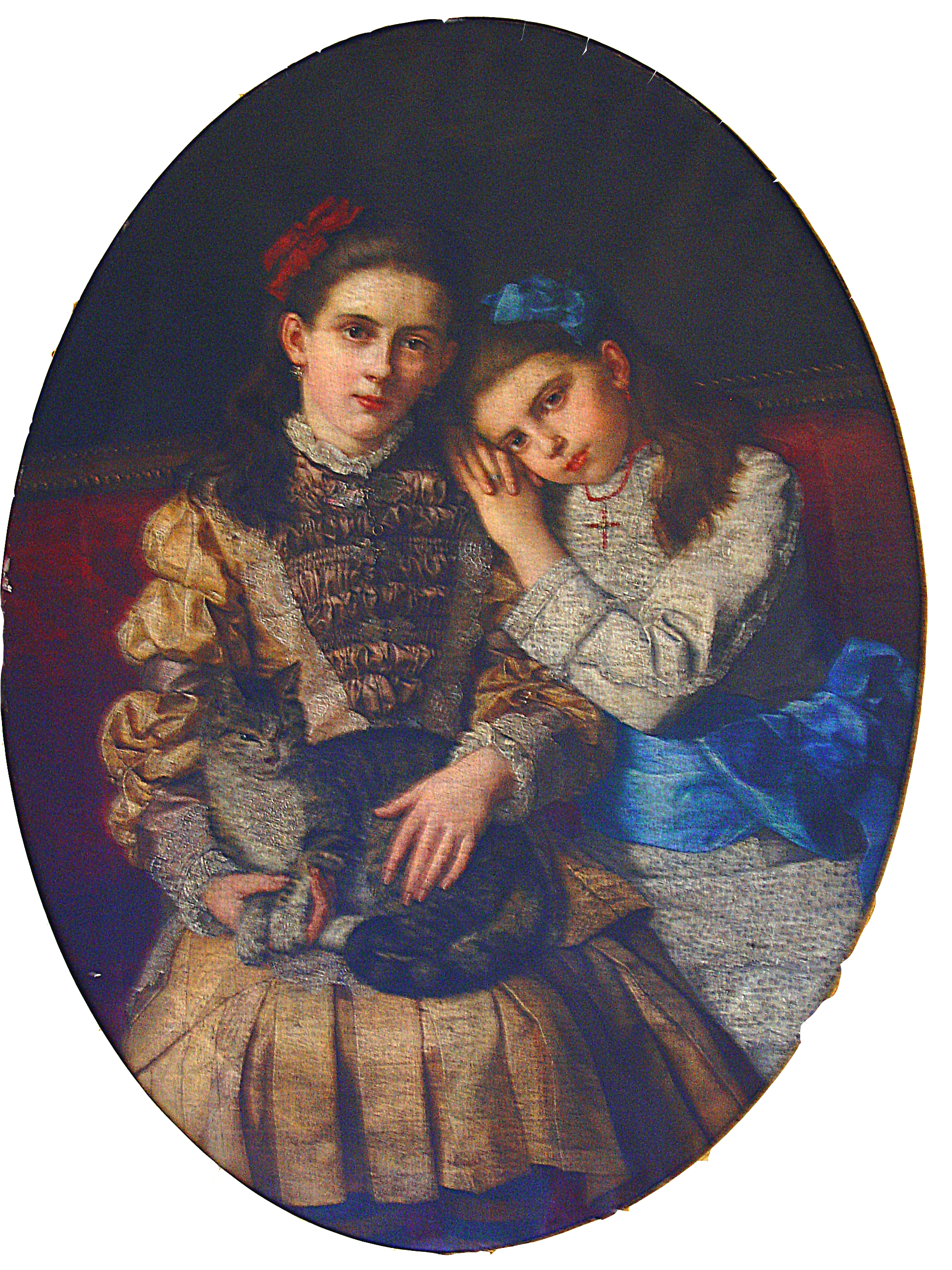
Lydia and Alice, the two daughters of Edmond Le Grelle and Bathilde De Wael, who died of black smallpox contracted in a Parisian palace in 1887

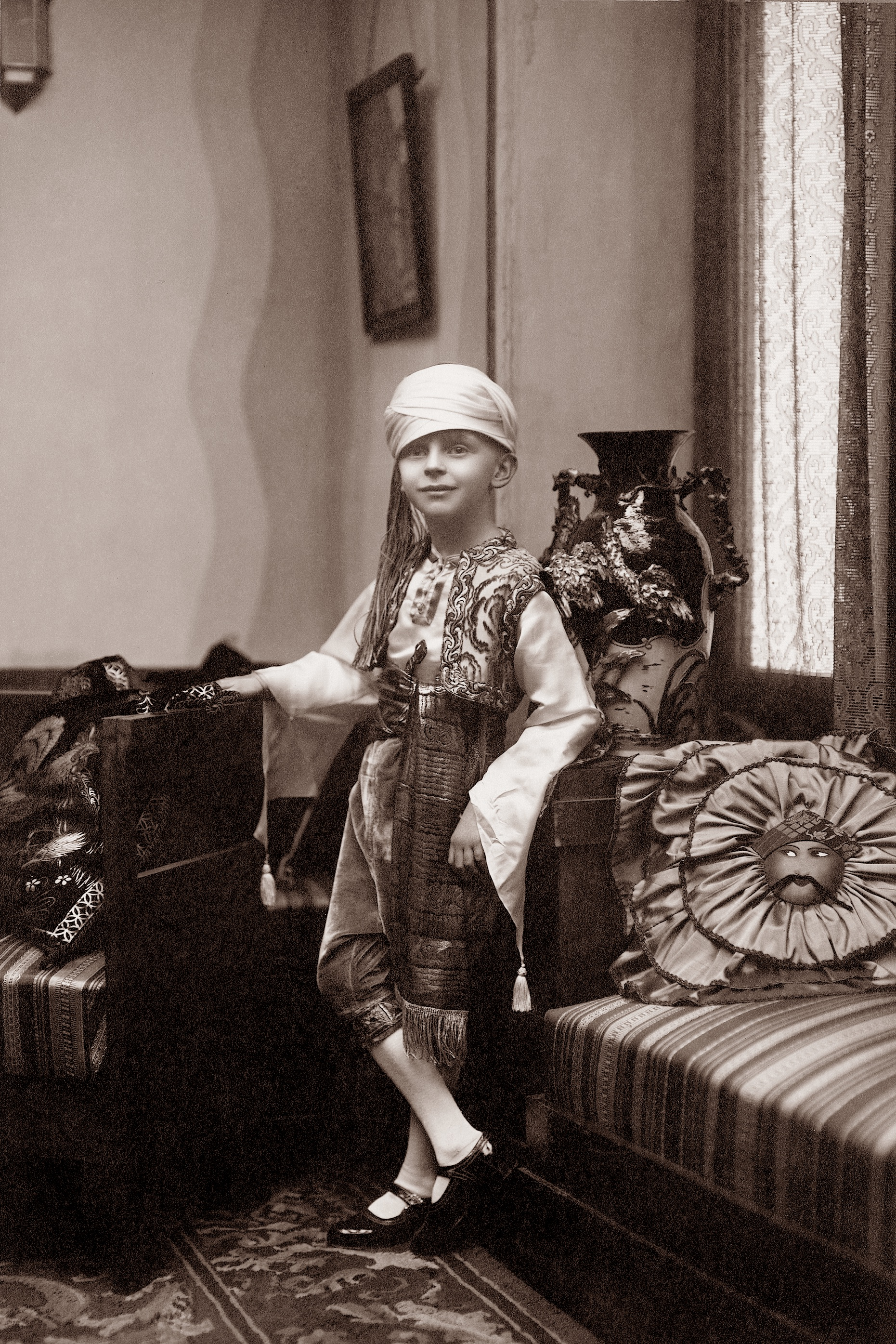
Count Adelin Le Grelle (1898–1973). He married Rosalie de Swert (grandmother of Cécilia Sarkozy) in 1921.

== Castels and estates ==
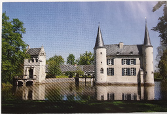
Rameyen Castle

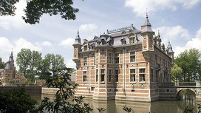
Gestelhof Castle

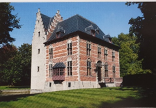
Doggenhout Castle

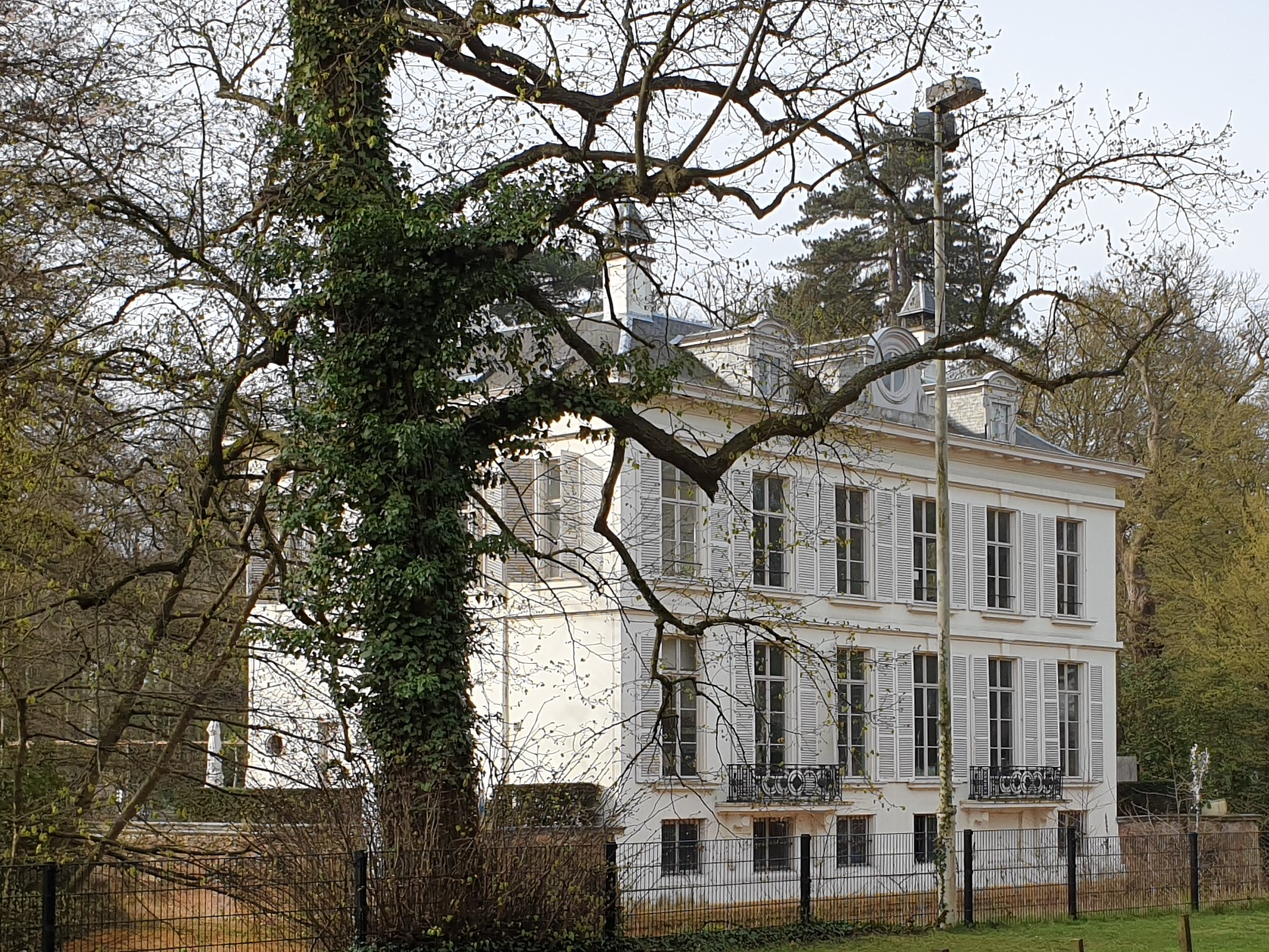
Middelheim Castle

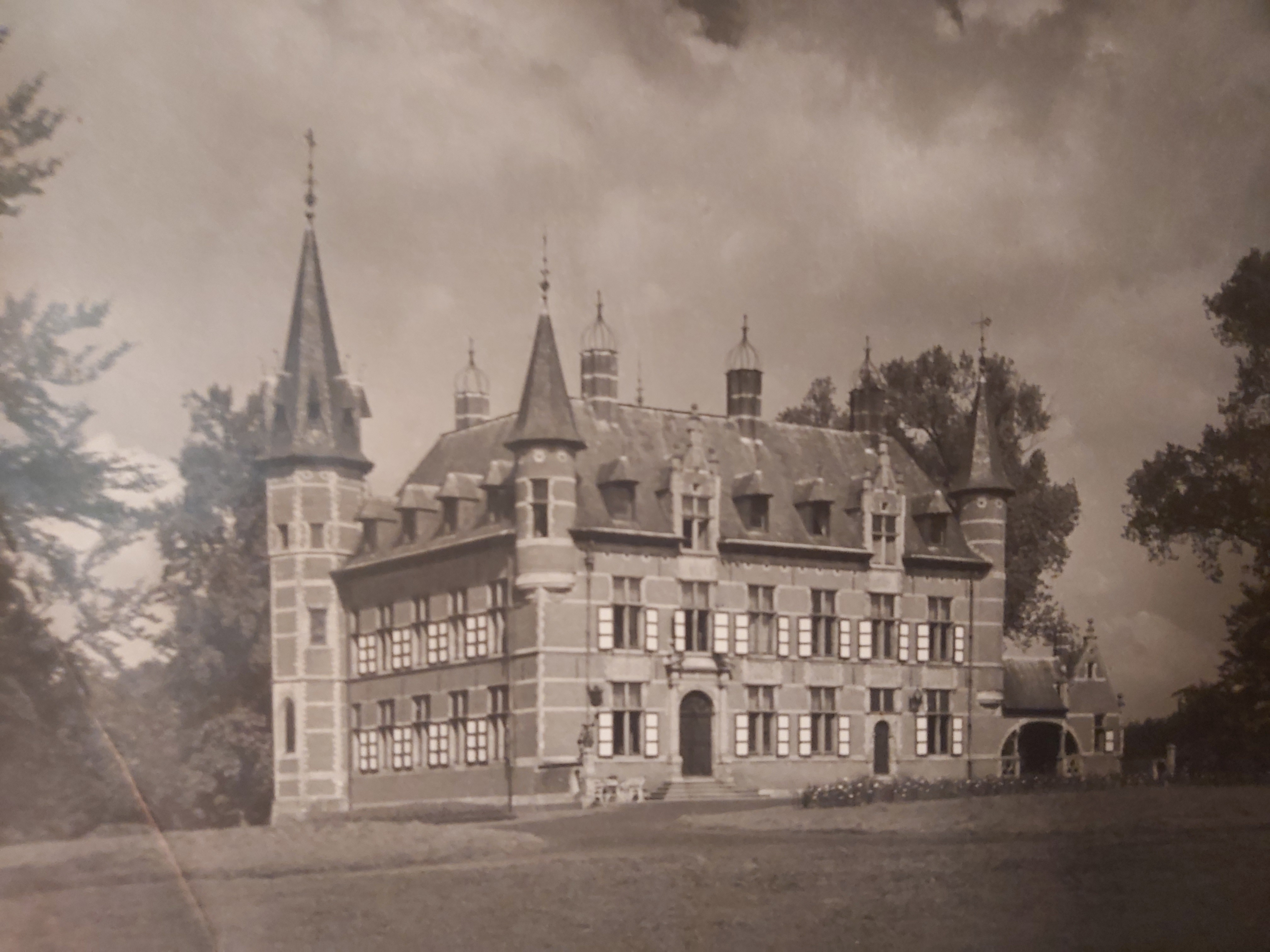
Selsaeten Castle in Wommelgem

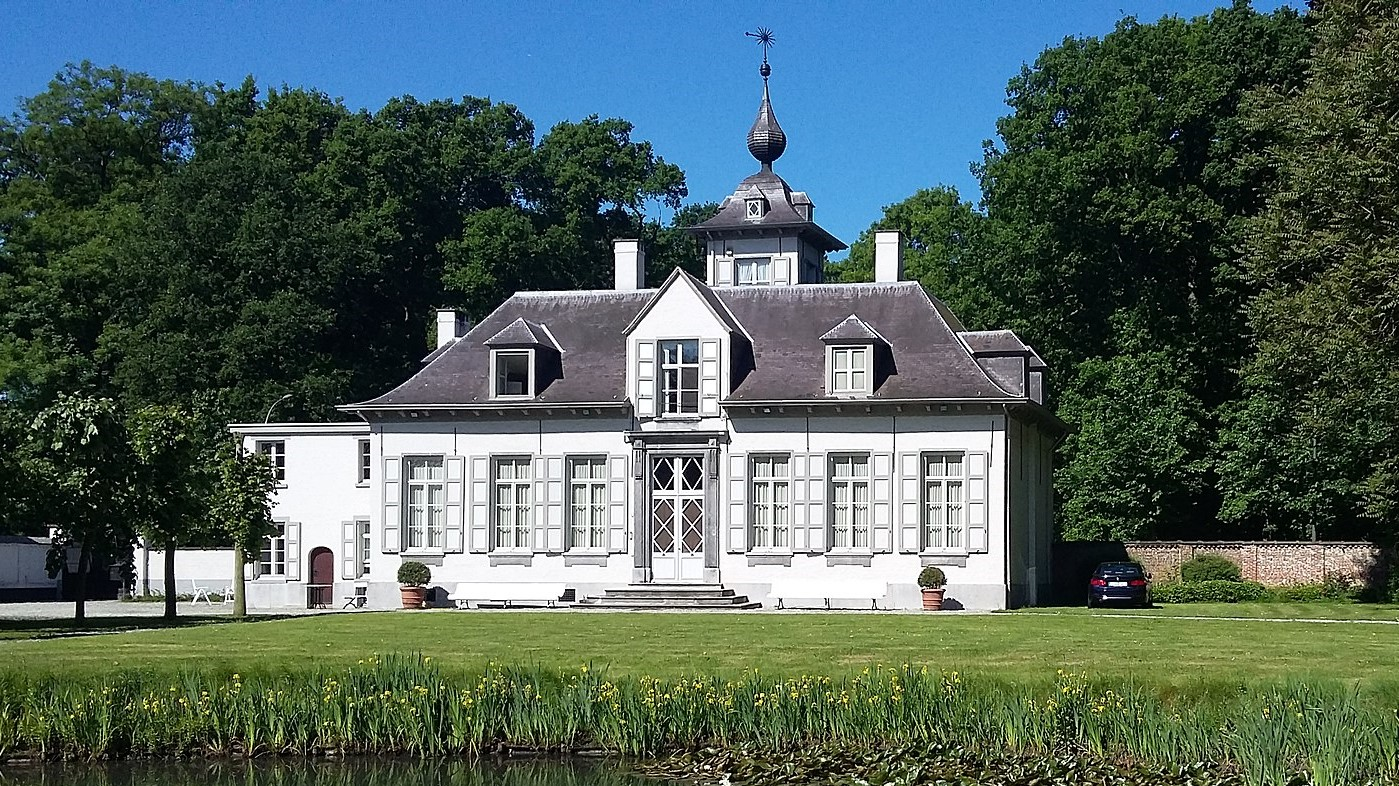
Reigerbos Castle in Berendrecht

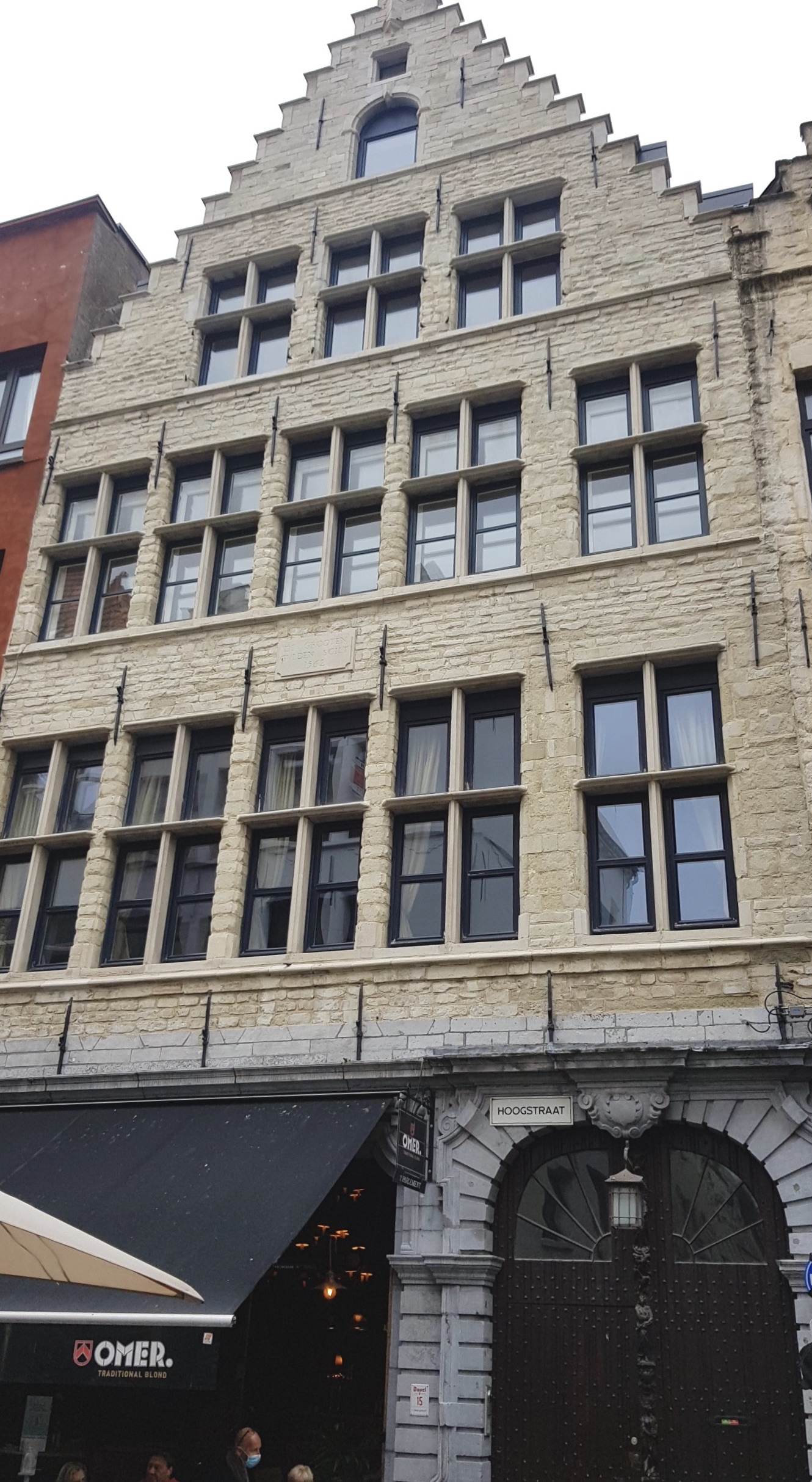
Mansion in the Hoogstraat in Antwerp

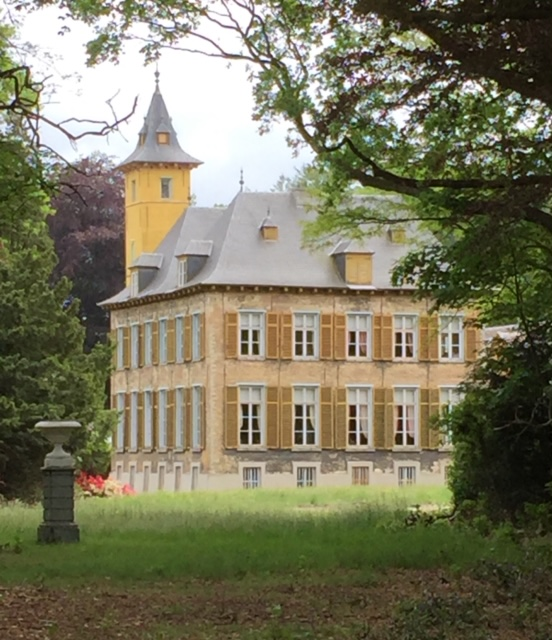
Reet Castle

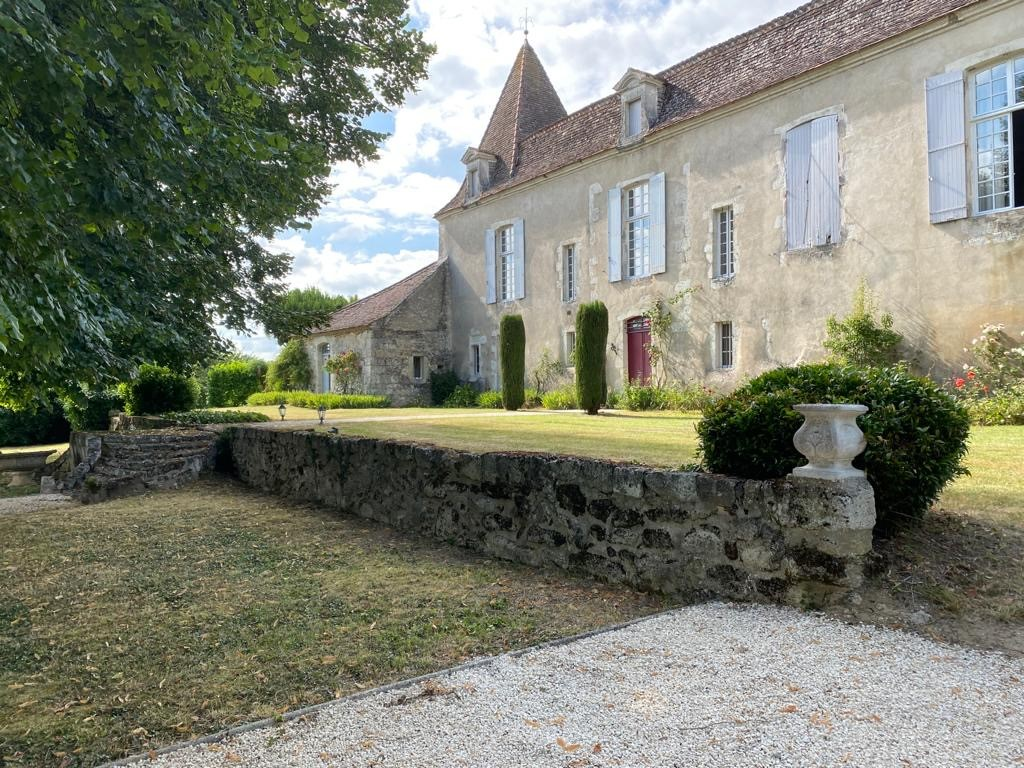
Ségur Castle

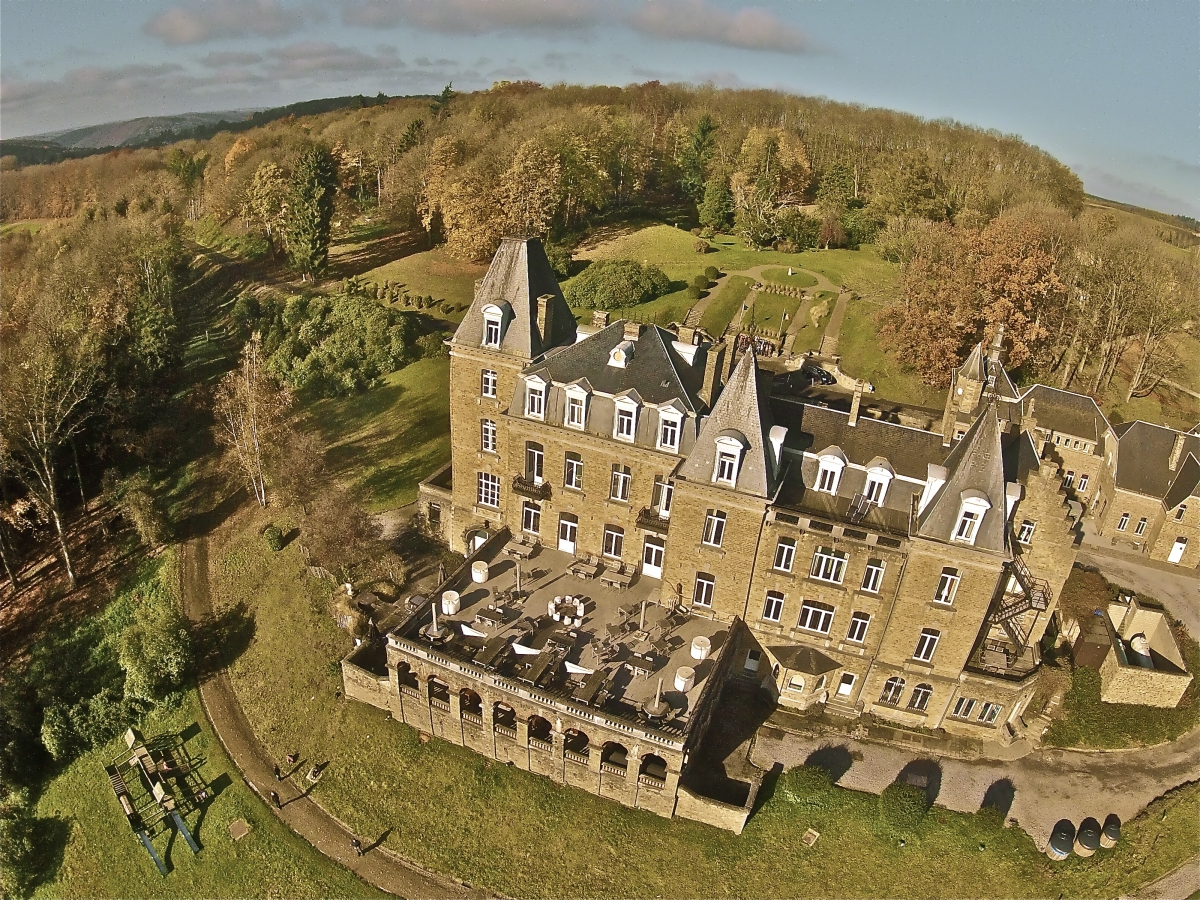
de la Poste Castle

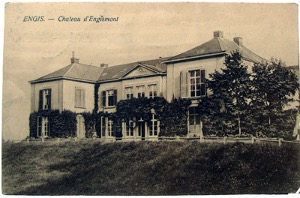
Engismont Castle

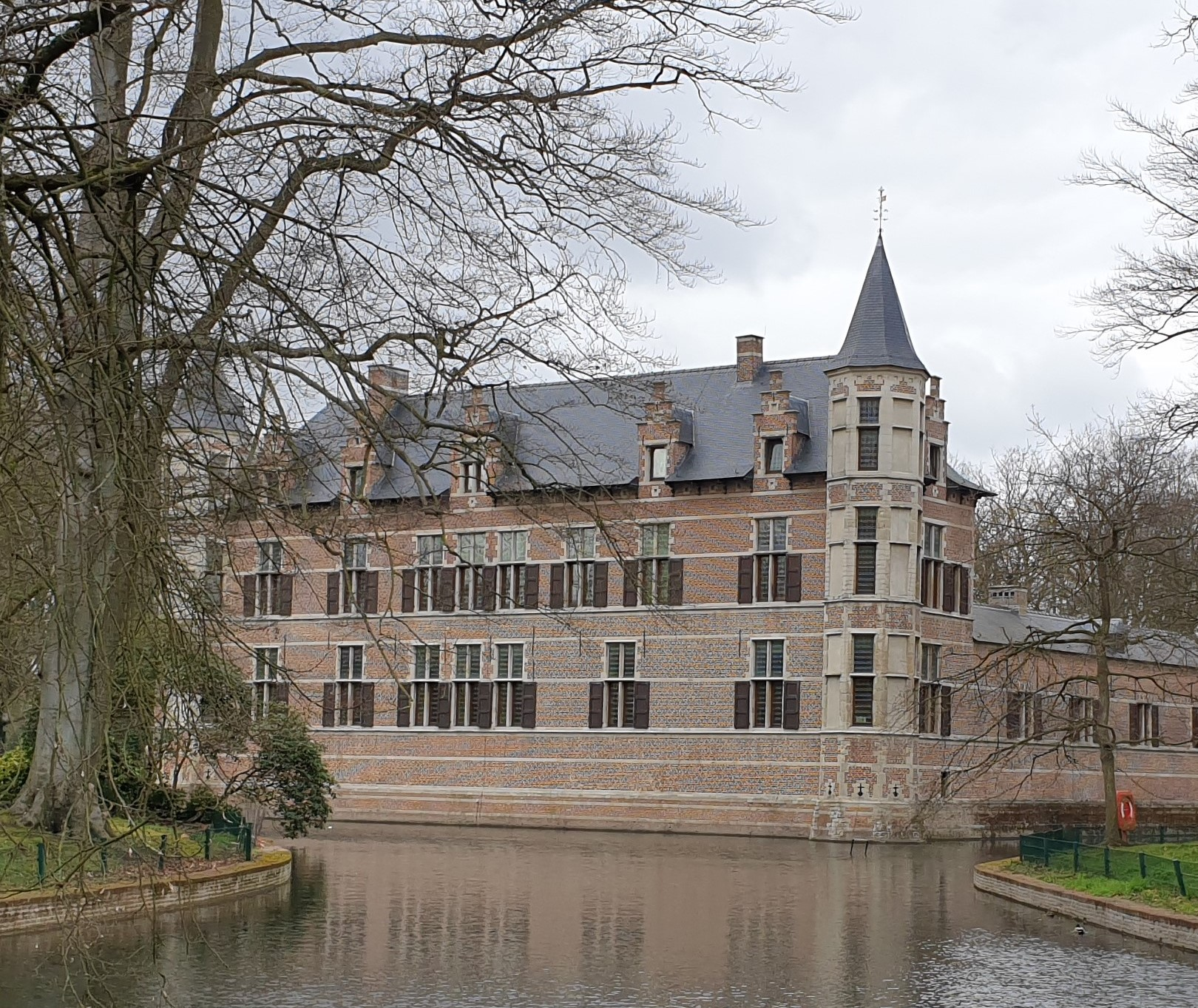
Veltwijck Castle

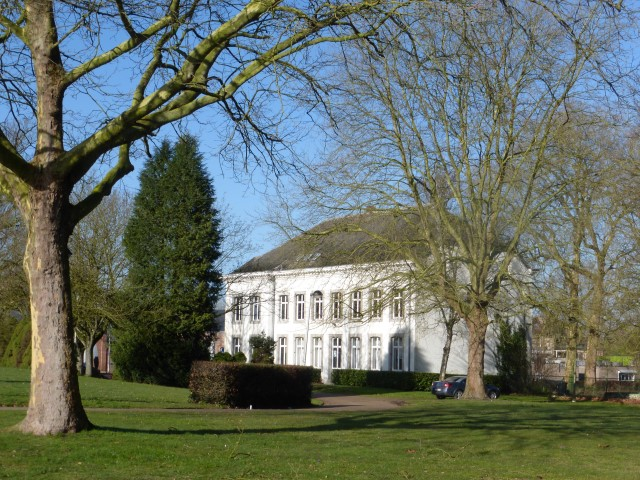
Edelhof castle in Munsterbilzen

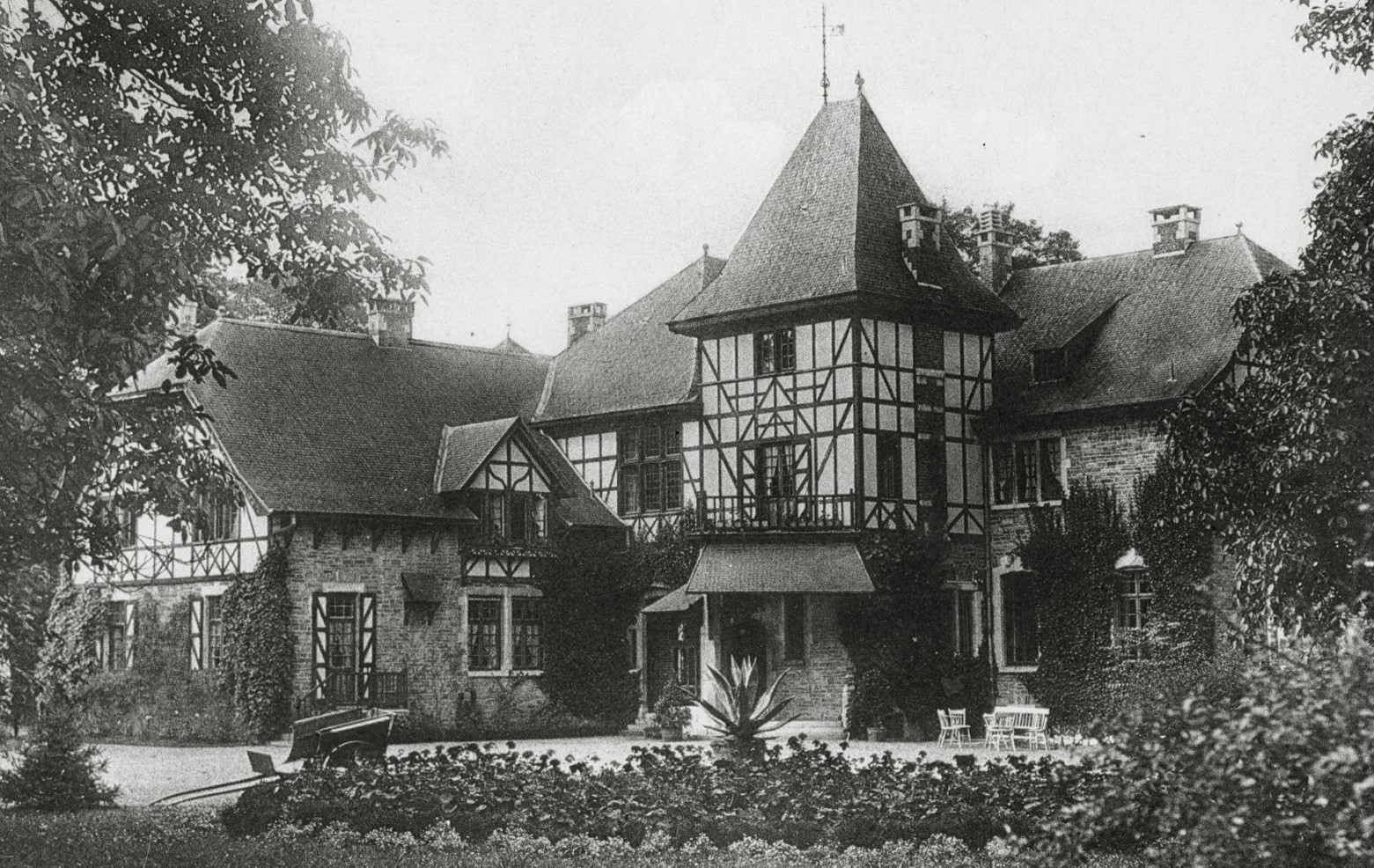
Presseux Castle

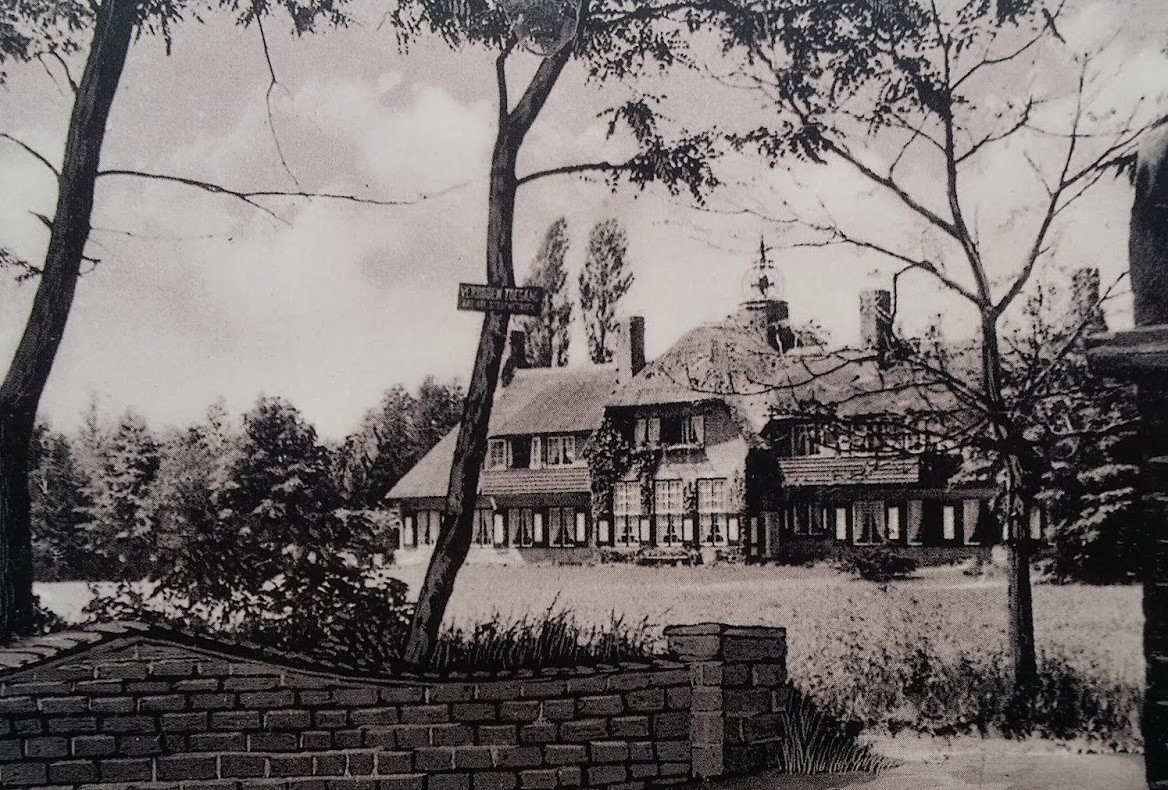
Sint Annaland Estate in Vught (The Netherlands)

== Books, articles, references and related links ==
=== Books and articles written by the Le Grelle's ===
- Freddy Cogels (Le Grelle cousin), Souvenirs d'un diplomate : du gâteau avec les duchesses ?, Hervé Douxchamps, 1983.
- Bernard Le Grelle, Jean-Claude Chermann, Olivier Galzi with Bernard Le Grelle, Tout le monde doit connaître cette histoire, Editions Stock, 2009.
- Bernard Le Grelle, Profession Lobbyman, Le Pouvoir des coulisses, Hachette, 1988.
- Geoffroy Le Grelle et Olivier de Trazegnies, « Belgique, les vielles familles d'Anvers » in l'Eventail, janvier 2015.
- Geoffroy Le Grelle, Archives Banque Joseph Guillaume Le Grelle, 2015, 34 pp.
- Geoffroy Le Grelle, « Het mysterie van de drie As », in Heraldicum disputationes, 1997.
- Geoffroy Le Grelle, « La Chronique des « Le Grelle » », in Legrelliana, n°1, juillet 1996, p. 47-55 et n°2, août 1997, p. 77.
- Geoffroy Le Grelle, « La Rente romaine et le denier de Saint-Pierre », Pro Petri Sede, 1–2010, p. 30-32.
- Geoffroy Le Grelle, « L'Histoire de nos lettres patentes au cours des siècles », in Legrelliana, 1999.
- Henry Le Grelle, Gentleman Globetrotter.
- Martine Le Grelle, Pour les grands oiseaux, il n'y a pas de Pyrénées, Editions Clepsydre.
- Maxime Le Grelle s.j., Brouage Quebec, Foi de Pionniers, Imprimerie A. Bordessoules, 1976.
- Maxime Le Grelle s.j., Champlain nous voilà.
- Roland Le Grelle, « Demeures familiales aux XVIIIe et XIXe siècles », in Legrelliana n° 2, août 1997, p. 61-67 and Legrelliana n°3, septembre 1998, p. 41-51.
- Roland Le Grelle, Guide pratique de la famille Le Grelle, 1988, 42 pp.
- Roland Le Grelle, Lex Molenaar (avec Roland Le Grelle), Een groot Antwerps verhaal. Graaf Daniel Le Grelle. De kroniek van een man en zijn stad in een tijd van grote veranderingen, Anvers, 2012.

=== Related Links ===
- Liste chronologique de familles belges
- List of noble families in Belgium
- Liste de devises de familles belges
- National Biography of Belgium
- Gérard Le Grelle
- Daniel Le Grelle
- Maxime Le Grelle
- Ferdinand Le Grelle
- Bernard Le Grelle
