= Tripartite system (United Kingdom) =

Grammar school, technical school, and secondary modern school

The tripartite system was the selective school system of state-funded secondary education between 1945 and the 1970s in England and Wales, and from 1947 onwards in Northern Ireland (but never in Scotland). It was an administrative implementation of the Education Act 1944 and the Education Act (Northern Ireland) 1947. The tripartite system is not mentioned in either Act, this model was a consensus of both major political parties based on the 1938 Spens Report.

State-funded secondary education was to be structured as three types of school: grammar school; secondary technical school (sometimes described as technical grammar or technical high school); secondary modern school. Not all education authorities implemented the tripartite system; some maintained only two types of secondary school, the grammar and the secondary modern.

Pupils were allocated to their respective types of school according to their performance in the 11-plus or the 13-plus examination. It was the prevalent system under the Conservative governments of the 1951 to 1964 period, but was actively discouraged by the Labour government after 1965. The 1976 Education Act made provision to cease selection for secondary education with the intention of universal comprehensive education in England and Wales. However, elements of similar systems persist in several English counties such as Kent and Lincolnshire, which maintain the grammar schools alongside other less academic non-selective secondary schools. The system's merits and demerits, in particular the need and selection for grammar schools, were contentious issues at the time and remain so.

== A new design for secondary education ==
=== Origins ===
Prior to 1944 the British secondary education system was fundamentally an ad hoc creation. Access was not universally available, and varied greatly by region. Schools had been created by local government, private charity and religious foundations. Education was often a serious drain on family resources, and subsidies for school expenses were sporadic. Secondary education was mainly the preserve of the middle classes, and in 1938 only 13% of working class 13-year-olds were still in school.

Many of the schools created since the 1870s were grammar schools, which offered places based on an entrance test. Places were highly desired and seen as offering a great chance at success. These schools were widely admired, and were to become a model for the tier-structured education reforms of the 1940s.

There was also a strong belief in the value and accuracy of psychometric testing. Some in the educational establishment, particularly the psychologist Sir Cyril Burt, argued that testing students was a valid way of assessing their suitability for various types of education. Similar conclusions were drawn in a number of other countries, including France, Italy, Germany and Sweden, all of which operated a state-run system of selective schools.

The 1926 Hadow Report had recommended that the education system be formally split into separate stages at the age of eleven or twelve. Before this point there had been no formal demarcation between primary and secondary education as known in modern society. The creation of this break would encourage the establishment of selection at the point when pupils were changing schools. The Spens Report of 1938 recommended the tripartite system viz. grammar, technical high and 'modern' secondary schools. The 1943 Norwood Report echoed the tripartite recommendation. These reports established the basis of the post 1944 reform.

=== The Butler Act ===
The 1944 Butler Education Act radically overhauled education in England and Wales, and the Education (Northern Ireland) Act 1947 set out a similar restructuring for Northern Ireland. For the first time, secondary education was to become a right, and was to be universally provided. It would also be free, with financial assistance for poor students. This was part of the major shake-up of government welfare in the wake of the 1942 Beveridge Report.

In addition to promising universal secondary education, the act intended to improve the kind of education provided. Children would be provided with the type of education which most suited their needs and abilities. Calling their creation the tripartite system, education officials envisaged a radical technocratic system in which skill was the major factor in deciding access to education, rather than financial resources. It would meet the needs of the economy, providing intellectuals, technicians and general workers, each with the required training.

The Act was created in the abstract, making the resultant system more idealistic than practical. In particular, it assumed that adequate resources would be allocated to implement the system fully.

=== Design of the system ===
The basic assumption of the tripartite system was that all students, regardless of background, should be entitled to an education appropriate to their needs and abilities. It was also assumed that students with different abilities were suited to different curricula. It was believed that an IQ test was a legitimate way of determining a child's suitability to a particular tier.

There would be three categories of state-run secondary schools. Each was designed with a specific purpose in mind, aiming to impart a range of skills appropriate to the needs and future careers of their pupils.

- Grammar schools were intended to teach a highly academic curriculum, teaching students to deal with abstract concepts. There was a strong focus on intellectual subjects, such as literature, classics and complex mathematics. As well as wholly state-funded grammar schools, schools that received state grants could become direct grant grammar schools, with some pupils funded by the state, the rest paying fees.
- Secondary technical schools were designed to train children adept in mechanical and scientific subjects. The focus of the schools was on providing high academic standards in demanding subjects such as physics, chemistry, advanced mathematics and biology to create pupils that could become scientists, engineers and technicians.
- Secondary modern schools (secondary intermediate schools in Northern Ireland) would mainly train pupils in practical skills, aimed at equipping them for less skilled jobs and home management. Multiple secondary modern schools, however, offered academic streams to achieve CSE and GCE Ordinary Level qualifications in mainstream subject areas (Mathematics, English Language and Literature, History, Geography, Science etc.)

It was intended for all three branches of the system to have a parity of esteem. The appropriate type of school for each student would be determined by their performance in an examination taken in the final year of primary school.

== The system in operation ==
=== Implementation ===
The tripartite system was arguably the least politically controversial of the great post-war welfare reforms. The Butler Act had been written by a Conservative, and had received the full backing of Prime Minister Winston Churchill.

Many in the Labour party, meanwhile, were enthusiastic about the ability of the tripartite system to enable social mobility. A first-rate education would now be available to any capable child, not simply a rich one. The tripartite system seemed an excellent tool with which to erode class barriers.

In spite of this broad approval, the resources for implementing the system were slow in coming. The logistical difficulties of building enough secondary schools for the entire country delayed the introduction of tripartite education. It was not until 1951, and the election of a Conservative government, that the system began to be widely implemented. Some historians have argued that tripartite education was the Conservative answer to the attractions of the Welfare state, replacing collective benefits with individual opportunities. Even so, there was still a dramatic shortfall in resources for the new education system.

Very few technical schools were opened, due to the lack of money and a shortage of suitably qualified teachers. This failure to develop the technical part of the system undermined the whole structure. The tripartite system became, in effect, a two-tier system with grammar schools for the academically gifted and secondary modern schools for the others.

Grammar schools received the lion's share of the money, reinforcing their image as the best part of the system, and places in grammar schools were highly sought after. Around 25% of children went to a grammar school, although there was a severe regional imbalance, with several more grammar school places available in the South than in the North, and with fewer places available for girls. This was partly the result of a historical neglect of education in the north of England, which the tripartite system did much to correct. Nevertheless, in 1963 there were grammar school places for 33% of the children in Wales and only 22% of children in the Eastern region.

Secondary modern schools were correspondingly neglected, giving them the appearance of being 'sink schools'. Although explicitly not presented as such, the secondary modern was widely perceived as the bottom tier of the tripartite system. They suffered from underinvestment and poor reputations, in spite of educating around 70% of the UK's school children. The Newsom Report of 1963, looking at the education of average and below average children, found that secondary moderns in slum areas of London left fifteen-year-olds sitting on primary school furniture and faced teachers changing as often as once a term.

Existing beliefs about education and the failure to develop the technical schools led to the grammar schools being perceived as superior to the alternatives. The system failed to take into account the public perception of the different types of school. Whilst officially no type was seen as better than the other, it was a generally held belief amongst the general public that the grammar schools were the best schools available, and entry into the other two was considered a "failure".

Alongside this system existed a number of public schools and other fee-paying educational establishments. These organised their own intakes, and were not tied to the curricula of any of the above schools. In practice, most of these were educationally similar to grammar schools but with a full ability range amongst their pupils.

=== The 11-plus ===
To allocate students between the three types of school, multiple students sat an exam during their final year at primary school; at the age of 10 or 11 years, depending on when their birthday fell. In some areas e.g. Wisbech, Isle of Ely the test was two years later (i.e. a Thirteen-Plus to enter Wisbech Grammar School). Three tests were given; one tested mathematical ability, one set an essay on a general topic and a third examined general reasoning.

Originally, these tests were intended to decide which school would be best suited to a child's needs – officially there was no "pass" or "fail" – the result determined which of the three types of school the child went to. However, because of the lack of technical schools, the Eleven-Plus came to be seen as a pass-or-fail exam, either earning children a place at their local grammar school or consigning them to a secondary modern. As such, "passing" the 11-plus came to be seen as essential for success in later life and led to schools being seen to be in tiers.

The early 11-plus papers were culturally and linguistically biased towards the values and knowledge of the middle- and upper-class, resulting in children of working class backgrounds being statistically far more likely to fail the exam.

=== Examination systems and relationship to further education ===
Different types of schools entered their pupils for different examinations at age 16. Grammar school students would take General Certificate of Education (GCE) O-levels, while children at secondary moderns initially took no examinations at all. Some secondary modern schools offered qualifications that were set, for example, by regional examination boards, such as the Union of Lancashire and Cheshire Institutes and the Northern Counties Technical Examinations Council. The latter exam was taken after four years at secondary school. Such examinations were comparable with the Certificate of Secondary Education (CSE) which was introduced in 1965. Less demanding than GCE O-level, results in the GCE and CSE exams were graded on the same scale, with the top CSE grade, grade 1, being equivalent to a simple pass at GCE O-level.

Secondary moderns did over time develop O-level courses for bright students, but in 1963 only 41,056 pupils sat them, roughly one in ten. Some of these pupils' results were very good. Indeed, during the 1960s, students from secondary modern schools who took GCE 'O' Levels were increasingly achieving results comparable to those being achieved by students from grammar schools. This was remarkable given the disadvantages of secondary modern schools compared to grammar schools in providing education for GCE O-Level candidates. Accordingly, the entire rationale for Tripartite streaming of students based upon the 11-plus examination was called into question.

Secondary modern schools continued in existence into the 1970s, and as time progressed more attention was given to the need to provide more challenging examinations, and to adopting the same approach to mixed abilities as the modern comprehensive system which existed at the same time.

Although the Butler Act offered further education for all, including students from secondary moderns, only children who went to grammar schools had a realistic chance of getting into university. Most secondary moderns did not offer A-levels, though a number of them in Northern Ireland in the 1970s did. Although students could obtain them elsewhere, few did and in 1963 only 318 secondary modern pupils sat the exams. Only grammar schools offered facilities for students who were preparing for the entrance examinations required to go to Oxbridge.

== Decline ==
=== The fall of the meritocracy ===
In 1958 the sociologist Michael Young published a book entitled The Rise of the Meritocracy. A mock-historical account of British education viewed from the year 2033, it satirised the beliefs of those who supported the tripartite system. Young argued that grammar schools were instituting a new elite, the meritocracy, and building an underclass to match. If allowed to continue, selective education would lead to renewed inequality and eventually revolution.

In July 1958 the Labour leader Hugh Gaitskell formally abandoned the tripartite system, calling for "grammar-school education for all". The party's fiercest opponent of the grammar school was Gaitskell's protégé, Anthony Crosland. Experiments with comprehensive schools had begun in 1946 by the London County Council, and they had taken hold in a few places in the UK. Anglesey, London, Coventry, the West Riding and Leicestershire had all abolished the tripartite system in the 50s and early 60s, for a variety of reasons.

=== Abolition in England and Wales ===
By 1965, 65 local education authorities (LEAs) had plans to switch to comprehensive schools, and another 55 were considering it. Over the next few years this grassroots change would be reinforced by central government policy.

Labour had won the 1964 election, and Anthony Crosland became Secretary of State for Education in January 1965. He was an adamant critic of the tripartite system, and once remarked, "If it's the last thing I do, I'm going to destroy every last fucking grammar school in England. And Wales. And Northern Ireland." Soon after he came to office he issued Circular 10/65. This asked LEAs to begin planning the switch from the tripartite system to the Comprehensive System, withholding funding for new school buildings from those that did not comply. This change would be reinforced by the Education Act 1968. By 1970, 115 LEAs had had their reorganisation plans approved. Thirteen had had theirs rejected, and a further ten had defied the Labour government and refused to submit any plans at all.

Initially the move generated little opposition. It was portrayed foremost as an effort to raise standards in secondary moderns, and Prime Minister Harold Wilson had promised that grammar schools would only be closed "over my dead body". However, some grammar schools were closed, and others were amalgamated with nearby secondary moderns.

Opposition developed, mainly on a local level in protest of the treatment of a particular grammar school. Particularly strong opposition was noted in Bristol, after the LEA ended all grammar school education in 1964. However, there was little nationwide organisation among the defenders of the tripartite system. The most prominent attack on the introduction of comprehensives came in the series of Black Papers (as opposed to White Papers, which are issued by the government) published in the Critical Quarterly by A.E. Dyson and Brian Cox. Comprehensivisation was accused of using schools "directly as tools to achieve social and political objectives", rather than for the education of pupils.

More grammar schools were closed under Margaret Thatcher than any other Education Secretary, but this was by now a local process, which was allowed to continue to avoid controversy. Her Circular 10/70 removed the compulsion of Circular 10/65, leaving it up to individual LEAs whether or not they would go comprehensive.

=== Aftermath and legacy ===
The end of the tripartite system was reinforced by the new Labour government of 1974. One of its first actions on education was Circular 4/74, reiterating Labour's intention to continue with comprehensivisation. The Education Act 1976 established 'the comprehensive principle' in that 'education is to be provided only in schools where the arrangements for the admission of pupils are not based (wholly or partly) on selection by reference to ability or aptitude.'. Local education authorities were required in the Act to submit proposals for comprehensive education to the Secretary of State.

The 1976 Act proved the high-point of the Comprehensive movement. Margaret Thatcher's government allowed selection once again in 1979, and it has been used increasingly by individual schools eager to choose those they perceive to be the best pupils. The counties of Lincolnshire, Buckinghamshire, and Kent continue to operate a form of the tripartite system. Currently there are still 163 state-run grammar schools in England schooling 141,000 pupils per year. In 1983 Solihull attempted to reintroduce grammar schools, but was stopped by opposition. In 1986 the first City Technology Colleges were proposed, arguably inspired by the technical schools, but in the 2000s most of them converted to academies. Today, no formal attempts are being made to restore the tripartite system.

The abolition of the grammar schools benefitted private schools. Free, high-quality education for grammar school pupils had dramatically reduced independent school pupil numbers, from around 10% of the school population to 5.5%. However, now that comprehensive equality had been widely instituted, a large number of parents were willing to pay to extricate their children from it. Most of the direct grant grammar schools converted to fully fee-paying independent schools, retaining selection of entrants. The proportion of children opting out of the state system continued to rise until recently, standing at around 8%.

== Survival of the system in Northern Ireland ==
While vestiges of the tripartite system persist in several English counties, the largest area where the 11-plus system remains in operation is Northern Ireland. Original proposals for switching to the Comprehensive system were put forward in 1971, but the suspension of devolution meant that they were never acted upon. As a result, each year around 16,000 pupils in the area take the 11-plus transfer test. Pupils are rated between grades A and D, with preferred access to schools being given to those with higher grades. Until 1989, around 1/3 of pupils who took the exam, or 27% of the age group, were given places in a grammar school.

Under the "open enrolment" reform of 1989, grammar schools in Northern Ireland (unlike the remaining grammar schools in England) were required to accept pupils up to their capacity, which was also increased. Together with falling numbers of school-age children, this has led to a significant broadening of the grammar schools' intake. By 2006, 42% of transferring children were admitted to grammar schools, and in only 7 of the 69 grammar schools was the intake limited to the top 30% of the cohort.

In 2001, following the publication of the Burns Report on Post Primary Education, the decision was taken to abolish the examination. The subsequent Costello Report went further, and advocated an end to all selection in Northern Ireland's schooling. The education minister, Martin McGuinness of Sinn Féin, endorsed the Burns Report, as did the Social Democratic and Labour Party, while the Ulster Unionist Party and Democratic Unionist Party politicians condemned it. When devolution was suspended in 2002, the Northern Ireland Office decided to continue the policy, although the phase-out date of the eleven plus was put back from 2004 to 2008.

Opinion is divided on the wisdom of the decision. The Burns Report itself called the 11-plus system socially divisive and argued that it placed unreasonable pressures on teachers. Critics of the status quo in Northern Ireland say that primary education is overly focused on passing the 11-plus. Half of all students receive some kind of private tuition before going to the exam. Some pupils also say that the exam is a great source of stress.

Nevertheless, the existing system has produced good results. GCSE grades are much higher than in England and Wales. The number gaining five GCSEs at grades A-C, the standard measure of a good education, is ten percentage points higher. AS and A level results are also better. Access to universities is more equitable, with 41.3% of those from the bottom four socioeconomic groups going to university, as opposed to a national average of 28.4%.

Public opinion appears divided on the question. In a 2004 poll the people of Northern Ireland supported the abolition of the 11-plus by 55% to 41%. But they opposed the abolition of selective education 31% to 67%. There is widespread agreement that whatever the failings of the existing system, it is fair.

The last eleven plus took place in 2008, for the intake of September 2009. It is proposed that the replacement system have an additional transfer point at age 14, with the possibility of differentiated provision from that point. A school might, for example, specialise in providing an academic pathway from age 14. The choice of the appropriate type of school for each student is to be based on a range of measures, including performance in secondary school but excluding a separate test.

A consortium of 25 grammar schools have announced their intention to run a common entry test for 2009 admissions. One Catholic grammar school, Lumen Christi College, has also announced its intention to run its own tests.

== See also ==
- Education in the United Kingdom
- Grammar schools debate

== Bibliography ==
- Gillard, Derek, 'Us and Them: a history of pupil grouping policies in England's schools', (2008) (see the section '1945-1960: Doubts and concerns') https://education-uk.org/articles/27grouping.html
