= National Grammar Schools Association =

- Abbreviation: NGSA
- Formation: 1970s
- Legal status: Non-profit organisation
- Purpose: Grammar schools in England and Northern Ireland
- Region served: England and Northern Ireland
- Chairman: Robert McCartney
- Website: NGSA

The National Grammar Schools Association is an organisation in the United Kingdom which campaigns for the promotion of selective education.

== History ==
The National Grammar Schools Association was formed in the 1970s. Following Circular 10/65, issued by Harold Wilson who was the Prime Minister at the time of the Labour government in 1965, Local Education Authorities (LEAs) across the United Kingdom dismantled most grammar schools. However, many regions across the U.K have sixth form colleges, which were mostly in former grammar schools and have standards equivalent to grammar schools at A level. The United Kingdom Independence Party has publicly supported selective education.

=== Northern Ireland ===
Northern Ireland was not affected by the Circular 10/65, and has kept all of its grammar schools. However, there are current proposals, largely (if not solely) driven by Sinn Féin.

=== Academic concerns of comprehensive schools ===
The General Certificate of Secondary Education (GCSE), are able to educate children to an adequate standard, except for most inner cities. However at A level, notably in science, comprehensive school areas do not generally produce comparative results with areas with grammar schools. This is due to a supply and demand situation because areas with grammar schools have higher average house prices.

== Function ==
It represents the 164 grammar schools in England and the sixty-nine in Northern Ireland that are in existence. Two thirds of English LEAs do not have grammar schools. It produces the publication called NGSA News. It seeks to prevent the few Labour-controlled LEAs that have grammar schools from taking them into the comprehensive system. The Chairman is the former Unionist MP for North Down from 1995-2001.

== See also ==
- Campaign for State Education - supports the comprehensive system
- Campaign for Real Education - broadly supports the work of the NGSA
- School violence in the United Kingdom
- Young Gifted and Talented Programme
