= Grammarsgate =

2007 British political dispute

Grammarsgate was a 2007 dispute within the British Conservative Party over party policy on grammar schools. Party leader David Cameron refused to support the creation of more grammar schools instead backing Labour's policy of City Academies.

Conservative leader David Cameron referred to supporters of grammars as "inverse class warriors," and stated that the idea of creating more was delusional. This angered many traditional Conservative supporters for whom grammar schools were a popular policy. The Shadow Europe Minister Graham Brady resigned over disagreements on whether grammar schools boost social mobility. and the 1922 committee denounced David Cameron's policy as "absurd".

== See also ==
- Grammar schools debate
