= Brent North =

UK Parliament constituency (1974–2024)

Coordinates: 51.57°N 0.29°W

- Former borough constituency for the House of Commons
- Boundary of Brent North in Greater London
- County: Greater London
- Population: 128,484 (2011 census)
- Electorate: 82,648 (December 2010)
- Major settlements: Wembley, Kingsbury, Sudbury, Alperton, Kenton

1974–2024
- Seats: One
- Created from: Wembley North, Wembley South
- Replaced by: Brent West (bulk), Brent East (part), Harrow East (part)

Brent North was a constituency (Note: A borough constituency (for the purposes of election expenses and type of returning officer)) represented in the House of Commons of the UK Parliament from 1997 until its abolition for the 2024 general election by Barry Gardiner of the Labour Party. (Note: As with all constituencies, the constituency elects one Member of Parliament (MP) by the first past the post system of election at least every five years.)

Under the 2023 review of Westminster constituencies, the majority of the constituency was incorporated into the new seat of Brent West, with some parts going to the new seat of Brent East and the existing seat of Harrow East.

== History ==
Created in 1974 from the former seats of Wembley North and Wembley South, Brent North was a Conservative seat until 1997, held by Lancastrian former headmaster Rhodes Boyson with initially two fairly small 14% margins (Note: (rounded to nearest integer)) before the Conservative-dominated period beginning in 1979 which gave Boyson larger majorities until Labour won the seat in 1997. At the general elections of 1997 and 2001, Brent North produced the highest swing to Labour nationally. The winning candidate in 1997 was Glasgow-born Barry Gardiner, the youngest mayor of Cambridge in its history and former academic, who has held the seat ever since. The Liberal Democrats and their two predecessor parties (Liberal and SDP) amassed their largest share of the vote in 1974. Labour's percentage majority almost halved at the 2005 general election from 30.1% to 15.8% and fell slightly to 15.4% in 2010, faced with a new Conservative challenger, Harshadbhai Patel. The Labour Party vote increased in both the 2015 and 2017 general elections and then dramatically decreased to a 15.8% margin in 2019.

In the late 1980s, Brent North was around 25% Asian.

== Boundaries ==
Map of boundaries 2010–2024

1974–1983: The London Borough of Brent wards of Barnhill, Fryent, Kenton, Kingsbury, Preston, Queensbury, Roe Green, St Andrew's, Sudbury, Sudbury Court, and Tokyngton.

1983–1997: The London Borough of Brent wards of Barnhill, Fryent, Kenton, Kingsbury, Preston, Queensbury, Roe Green, St Andrew's, Sudbury, and Sudbury Court.

1997–2010: The London Borough of Brent wards of Barnhill, Fryent, Kenton, Kingsbury, Preston, Queensbury, Roe Green, Sudbury, and Sudbury Court.

2010–2024: The London Borough of Brent wards of Alperton, Barnhill, Fryent, Kenton, Northwick Park, Preston, Queensbury, Sudbury, and Wembley Central.

Most of the remaining wards in the London Borough of Brent were in the Brent Central constituency, with the exception of the wards of Brondesbury Park, Kilburn and Queens Park, which formed part of the Hampstead and Kilburn seat.

== Members of Parliament ==
Election	Member	Party
Feb 1974	Sir Rhodes Boyson	Conservative
1997	Barry Gardiner	Labour

== Election results ==
=== Elections in the 2010s ===
General election 2019: Brent North
Party	Candidate	Votes	%	±%
Labour	Barry Gardiner	26,911	51.9	−11.0
Conservative	Anjana Patel	18,832	36.3	+3.6
Liberal Democrats	Paul Lorber	4,065	7.8	+4.9
Brexit Party	Suzie O'Brien	951	1.8	New
Green	Simon Rebbitt	850	1.6	+0.4
Independent	Noel Coonan	169	0.3	New
Independent	Elcena Jeffers	101	0.2	−0.2
Majority		8,079	15.6	−14.6
Turnout		51,879	61.9	−6.5
Labour hold		Swing	-7.3	

General election 2017: Brent North
Party	Candidate	Votes	%	±%
Labour	Barry Gardiner	35,496	62.9	+8.6
Conservative	Ameet Jogia	18,435	32.7	−0.8
Liberal Democrats	Paul Lorber	1,614	2.9	−2.1
Green	Michaela Lichten	660	1.2	−1.7
Independent	Elcena Jeffers	239	0.4	0.0
Majority		17,061	30.2	+9.4
Turnout		56,444	68.4	+4.9
Registered electors		82,567		
Labour hold		Swing	+4.7	

General election 2015: Brent North
Party	Candidate	Votes	%	±%
Labour	Barry Gardiner	28,351	54.3	+7.4
Conservative	Luke Parker	17,517	33.5	+2.0
Liberal Democrats	Paul Lorber	2,607	5.0	−12.0
UKIP	Alan Craig	2,024	3.9	+3.2
Green	Scott Bartle	1,539	2.9	+1.5
Independent	Elcena Jeffers	197	0.4	New
Majority		10,834	20.8	+5.4
Turnout		52,235	63.5	+1.2
Registered electors		82,196		
Labour hold		Swing	+2.7	

General election 2010: Brent North
Party	Candidate	Votes	%	±%
Labour	Barry Gardiner	24,514	46.9	−2.5
Conservative	Harshadbhai Patel	16,486	31.5	+2.2
Liberal Democrats	James Allie	8,879	17.0	+2.1
Independent	Atiq Malik	734	1.4	New
Green	Martin Francis	725	1.4	New
UKIP	Sunita Webb	380	0.7	New
Brent North Needs An Independent MP	Jannen Vamadeva	333	0.6	New
English Democrat	Arvind Tailor	247	0.5	New
Majority		8,028	15.4	−0.4
Turnout		52,298	62.3	+3.9
Registered electors		83,896		
Labour hold		Swing	−2.3	

=== Elections in the 2000s ===
General election 2005: Brent North
Party	Candidate	Votes	%	±%
Labour	Barry Gardiner	17,420	48.8	−10.6
Conservative	Bob Blackman	11,779	33.0	+3.7
Liberal Democrats	Havard M. Hughes	5,672	15.9	+4.6
Peace and Progress	Babar Ahmad	685	1.9	New
Rainbow Dream Ticket	Rainbow George Weiss	126	0.4	New
Majority		5,641	15.8	−14.3
Turnout		35,682	59.3	+1.6
Registered electors		60,148		
Labour hold		Swing	−7.1	

General election 2001: Brent North
Party	Candidate	Votes	%	±%
Labour	Barry Gardiner	20,149	59.4	+8.7
Conservative	Philip Allott	9,944	29.3	−10.9
Liberal Democrats	Paul Lorber	3,846	11.3	+3.2
Majority		10,205	30.1	+19.6
Turnout		33,939	57.7	−12.8
Registered electors		58,789		
Labour hold		Swing	+9.8	

=== Elections in the 1990s ===
General election 1997: Brent North
Party	Candidate	Votes	%	±%
Labour	Barry Gardiner	19,343	50.7	+20.4
Conservative	Rhodes Boyson	15,324	40.2	−17.3
Liberal Democrats	Paul Lorber	3,104	8.1	−2.5
Natural Law	Tony F. Davids	204	0.5	−0.3
Rainbow Dream Ticket	George F. Clark	199	0.5	New
Majority		4,019	10.5	N/A
Turnout		38,174	70.5	−0.1
Registered electors		54,149		
Labour gain from Conservative		Swing	+18.9	

General election 1992: Brent North
Party	Candidate	Votes	%	±%
Conservative	Rhodes Boyson	23,445	56.2	−3.7
Labour	James Moher	13,314	31.9	+7.1
Liberal Democrats	Paul Lorber	4,149	10.0	−5.3
Independent	Thakore Vipul	356	0.9	New
Natural Law	Tony F. Davids	318	0.8	New
Majority		10,131	24.3	−10.8
Turnout		41,582	70.6	−0.4
Registered electors		58,917		
Conservative hold		Swing	−5.4	

=== Elections in the 1980s ===
General election 1987: Brent North
Party	Candidate	Votes	%	±%
Conservative	Rhodes Boyson	26,823	59.9	+3.6
Labour	Praful Patel	11,103	24.8	+1.7
SDP	Christopher Mularczyk	6,868	15.3	−5.3
Majority		15,720	35.1	+1.9
Turnout		44,794	71.0	+0.6
Registered electors		63,081		
Conservative hold		Swing	−2.2	

General election 1983: Brent North
Party	Candidate	Votes	%	±%
Conservative	Rhodes Boyson	24,842	56.3	+0.1
Labour	Sandra Jackson	10,191	23.1	−8.2
SDP	Thomas Mann	9,082	20.6	New
Majority		14,651	33.2	+12.6
Turnout		44,115	70.4	−6.3
Registered electors		62,679		
Conservative hold		Swing		

=== Elections in the 1970s ===
General election 1979: Brent North
Party	Candidate	Votes	%	±%
Conservative	Rhodes Boyson	29,995	54.2	+6.3
Labour	John Lebor	18,612	33.6	−0.2
Liberal	Andrew T. Ketteringham	5,872	10.6	−5.1
National Front	Graham John	873	1.6	−0.9
Majority		11,383	20.6	+6.5
Turnout		55,352	76.7	+4.8
Registered electors		72,158		
Conservative hold		Swing		

General election October 1974: Brent North
Party	Candidate	Votes	%	±%
Conservative	Rhodes Boyson	24,853	47.9	+3.3
Labour	T.J.C. Goudie	17,541	33.8	+2.9
Liberal	F. Harrison	8,158	15.7	−6.1
National Front	J. Cattanach	1,297	2.5	−0.2
Majority		7,312	14.1	+0.4
Turnout		51,849	71.9	−8.6
Registered electors		72,122		
Conservative hold		Swing		

General election February 1974: Brent North
Party	Candidate	Votes	%	±%
Conservative	Rhodes Boyson	25,700	44.6	
Labour	T.J.C. Goudie	17,759	30.9	
Liberal	F. Harrison	12,537	21.8	
National Front	A. Smith	1,570	2.7	
Majority		7,941	13.7	
Turnout		57,566	80.5	
Registered electors		71,494		
Conservative win (new seat)				

== See also ==
- Parliamentary constituencies in London
