= Moher (surname) =

Moher is a surname. Notable people with the surname include:

- David Moher (born 1957), Irish epidemiologist
- Frank Moher (born 1955), Canadian playwright, theatre director, and journalist
- Gayle Moher (born 1957), British-American professional bodybuilder
- James Moher, British trade unionist
- John Moher (1909–1985), Irish Fianna Fáil politician, auctioneer and farmer
- Mike Moher (born 1962), Canadian professional ice hockey right winger
