= Rhodes Boyson =

British politician (1925–2012)

The Right Honourable Sir Rhodes Boyson
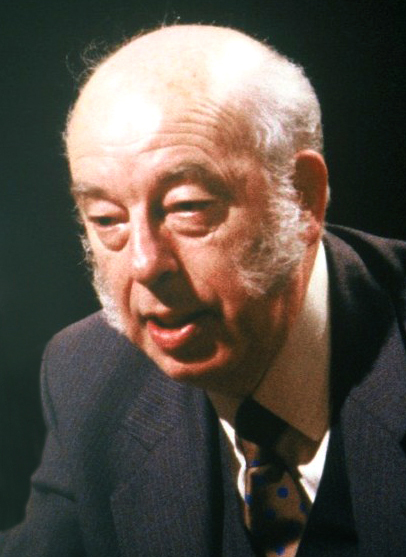
- Boyson in 1989

Minister of State for Local Government
- In office 10 September 1986 – 13 June 1987
- Prime Minister: Margaret Thatcher
- Preceded by: William Waldegrave
- Succeeded by: Michael Howard

Minister of State for Northern Ireland
- In office 11 September 1984 – 10 September 1986
- Prime Minister: Margaret Thatcher
- Preceded by: The Earl of Mansfield
- Succeeded by: Nicholas Scott

Minister of State for Social Security
- In office 13 June 1983 – 11 September 1984
- Prime Minister: Margaret Thatcher
- Preceded by: Hugh Rossi
- Succeeded by: Tony Newton

Parliamentary Under-Secretary of State for Education and Science
- In office 7 May 1979 – 12 June 1983
- Prime Minister: Margaret Thatcher
- Preceded by: Margaret Jackson
- Succeeded by: Bob Dunn

Member of Parliament for Brent North
- In office 28 February 1974 – 8 April 1997
- Preceded by: Constituency established
- Succeeded by: Barry Gardiner

Personal details
- Born: Rhodes Boyson; 11 May 1925 Haslingden, Lancashire, England
- Died: 28 August 2012 (aged 87) Harefield, London, England
- Party: Conservative
- Other political affiliations: Labour (before 1964)
- Spouses: Violet Burleston (m. 1946; div. 1971) Florette MacFarlane (m. 1971)
- Children: 2 (by Burleston)
- Education: London University

Military service
- Allegiance: United Kingdom
- Branch/service: Royal Navy

Sir Rhodes Boyson (11 May 1925 – 28 August 2012) was an English educator, author and Conservative Party politician who served as Member of Parliament for Brent North. He was knighted and made a member of the Privy Council in 1987.

== Early life ==
Born in Haslingden, Lancashire, England, the son of cotton-spinner and Alderman William Boyson MBE JP, and his wife Bertha, Rhodes Boyson was educated at Haslingden Grammar School, University College Cardiff, the University of Manchester, the London School of Economics, and Corpus Christi College, Cambridge.

He was awarded a PhD in 1967 by London University, his thesis being on Henry Ashworth, a Victorian Lancashire cotton manufacturer, brother-in-law of Richard Cobden, and a Radical campaigner who also had a reputation as a model employer. It was published in 1970 by Oxford University Press as The Ashworth Cotton Enterprise. The Rise and Fall of a Factory Firm. 1818–1880.

== Early career ==
Called up towards the end of the Second World War, Boyson served with the Royal Navy, based in India at the time of Independence, and from his late 20s, he was a Methodist lay preacher.

He became a teacher in 1950, and later a head teacher, first at Lea Bank Secondary Modern School in Cloughfold, Rossendale (1955–61), then at Robert Montefiore Secondary School, Stepney, London (1961–66), and finally from 1967 to 1974 at Highbury Grove School, a new all-boys' comprehensive in Islington, North London, of which he was the founding head teacher; in this capacity, and subsequently as an MP, he was outspoken in support of the retention of corporal punishment in British schools. He opposed what he perceived to be lax discipline, both in modern education and in the wider society, and at Highbury Grove he introduced an unfashionably traditional regime, with strictly enforced uniforms, caning for misbehaviour, and a house system. He said that this proved so popular with local parents that the school was consistently oversubscribed.

From 1957 to 1961, Boyson was a Labour councillor in Haslingden, where his father was at that time a Labour alderman and had been a trade union secretary. His father was a cotton spinner, and had been imprisoned as a conscientious objector in the First World War.

Boyson left the Labour Party in 1964, joining the Conservative Party three years later. He later wrote:

My own move to Conservative party membership arose from the effect of my research into the cotton industry and the Manchester school of liberal economic philosophy. Here was a body of men who believed that a free enterprise economy was not only efficient but brought moral growth to all men. The employer risked his capital on his judgement and must care for his workers as part of his stock in trade, and the workers would be enabled to become prosperous and through their own industry, thrift and moral courage could establish their own business enterprises and their personal independence to the advantage of themselves, their families and society. Cobden had a moral view of society and believed that free enterprise would not only bring prosperity but social harmony at home and peace abroad within a system of universal free trade.

In 1977, he was co-author (with Brian Cox) of one of the series of Black Papers on education, criticising many aspects of the comprehensive schools system.

Boyson was a severe critic of what he regarded as the influence of "mindless sociologists" who produced "mush which has corrupted the national character", noting in 1978 that "it has not gone unnoticed that crime has increased parallel with the number of social workers". The Daily Mirror responded with an editorial comment "that crime has also increased parallel with speeches from Dr. Boyson".

He served as chairman of the National Council for Educational Standards.

== Parliamentary career ==
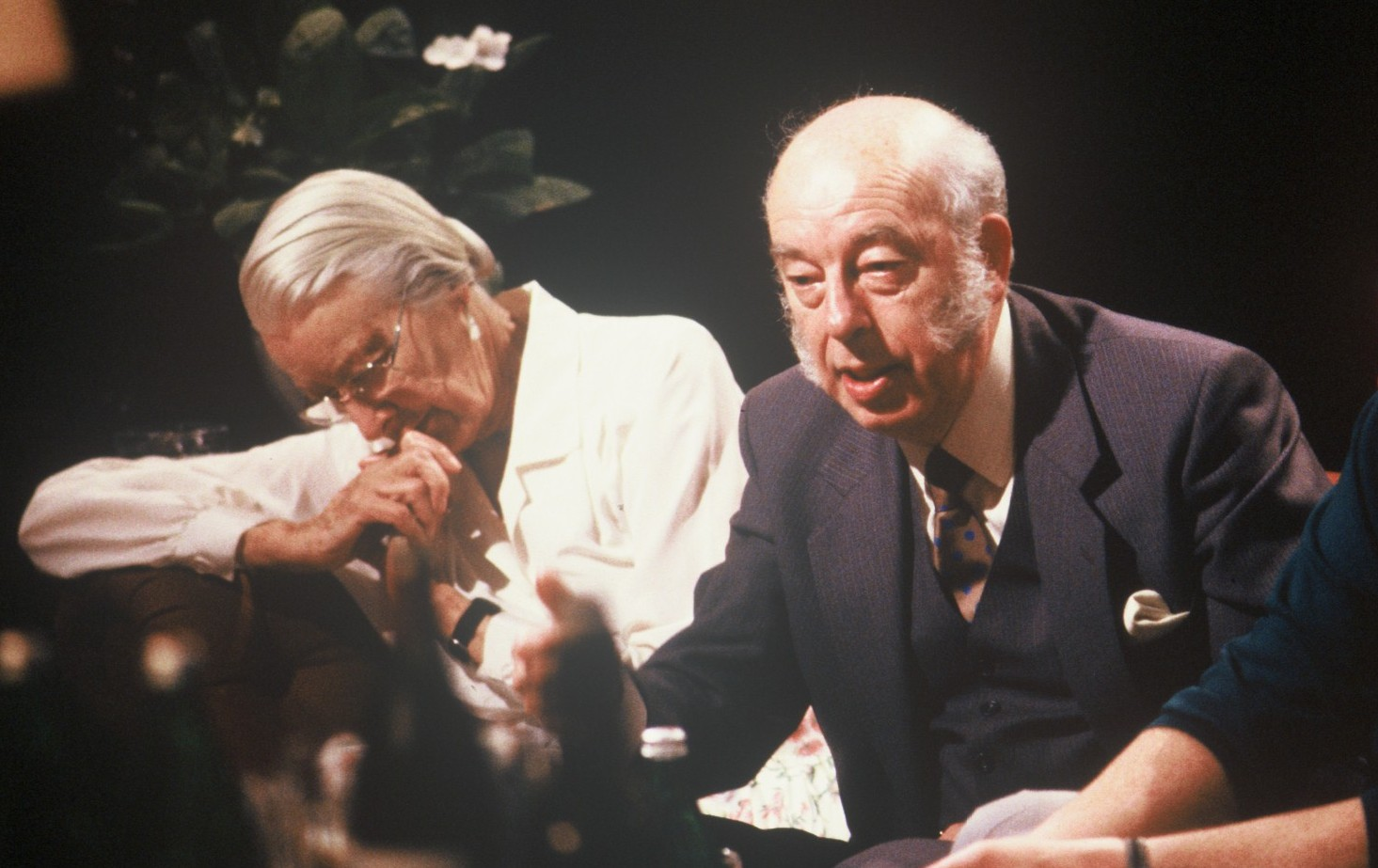
Appearing with Margaret Simey on the Channel 4 programme After Dark in 1989

Having stood unsuccessfully at Eccles in 1970, Boyson was first elected to the House of Commons in February 1974 for Brent North, and was Parliamentary Under-Secretary at the Department of Education and Science 1979–1983. In this capacity he sought to uphold schools' right to use the cane, and was nicknamed the "Minister for Flogging" by the anti-corporal-punishment campaign STOPP. He was Minister of State for Social Security 1983–1984, for Northern Ireland 1984–1986 and for Local Government 1986–1987.,.

Boyson was a supporter of the Conservative Monday Club and frequently addressed them. At the Conservative Party Annual Conference at Blackpool on 10 October 1991 he was the principal speaker at a Club fringe meeting on the subject of A Conservative Revolution in Education.

In 1994, he appeared on the BBC topical panel TV show Have I Got News for You. He also appeared on Brass Eye and was an early interviewee of Ali G.

Boyson lost his Brent North seat in the Labour landslide of 1997, his 24% majority turning to a 10% majority for the opposition. In 2001, the seat, no longer contested by Boyson, swung a further 9% to Labour.

== Personal life ==
Distinctive personal features were his mutton chop whiskers and strong Lancashire accent. The whiskers dated from an occasion when he rebuked pupils for having long hair at the school where he was headmaster: the students retorted jokingly, "Why don't you grow your hair, Sir, if we cut ours."

In 2007, he received an honorary degree from the University of Buckingham.

Boyson married Violet Burletson in 1946, and they had two daughters. The couple divorced in 1971, after which he married Florette MacFarlane, a teacher. He and his second wife lived in Pinner, northwest London, until he moved into Cedar House nursing home in Harefield, where he died aged 87. He left more than £2,000,000 in his will, the majority of it going to his widow. She died in 2018.

Parliament of the United Kingdom
New constituency	Member of Parliament for Brent North; 1974–1997	Succeeded by Barry Gardiner
Political offices
Preceded by Hugh Rossi	Minister of State for Social Security (Minister for the Disabled); 1983–1984	Succeeded by Tony Newton
