= A. E. Dyson =

British literary critic and academic (1928–2002)

- Born: Anthony Edward Dyson; 28 November 1928; Paddington, London, England
- Died: 30 July 2002 (aged 73); London, England
- Other names: Tony Dyson
- Education: Pembroke College, Cambridge
- Occupations: Literary critic, academic and campaigner
- Partner: Clifford Tucker (1912–1993)

Anthony Edward Dyson, aka Tony Dyson (28 November 1928 – 30 July 2002) was a British literary critic, university lecturer, educational activist and gay rights campaigner.

== Biography ==
Educated at Pembroke College, Cambridge, Dyson began his academic career in 1955, when he was appointed Assistant Lecturer in English Literature at the University of North Wales, Bangor. From there, he went to the University of East Anglia, where he was later appointed Reader. He took early retirement in the 1980s.

Dyson single-handedly took the initiative in forming the Homosexual Law Reform Society (HLRS) in May 1958. He had sent hundreds of letters to Members of Parliament and celebrities asking for their support, successfully bringing together an impressive collection of distinguished names, including Noel Annan, Lord Attlee, Alfred Ayer, Isaiah Berlin, Trevor Huddleston, Julian Huxley, C. Day-Lewis, J. B. Priestley, Bertrand Russell, Donald Soper, A. J. P. Taylor, Angus Wilson and Barbara Wootton. The campaign began with a letter, signed by all these figures, published in The Times on 7 March 1958, calling for the implementation of the Wolfenden Committee's recommendations that the law in relation to male homosexual relations be liberalised. Dyson had written on the University of North Wales headed paper making a bold statement of exactly who and where he was, which was a risky move. "It is difficult to comprehend the danger of living as a homosexual before the law was reformed in 1967, with the ever-present threat of criminal proceeding or blackmail. Dyson's careful and courageous handling of the campaign during these years was instrumental in ensuring that it did not arouse animosity and become counter-productive."

The same group of people simultaneously founded the Albany Trust, the charitable arm of the HLRS, which became the pioneer national counselling agency for gay men and lesbians. Dyson was Vice-Chairman of the HLRS and a Trustee of the Albany Trust.

During this time, he met Cliff Tucker (18 December 1912 – 21 May 1993), a senior executive at BP, a Labour Party councillor in inner London and a magistrate. They lived together for 35 years until Tucker's death in 1993. Dyson followed Tucker's final wishes and bequeathed the proceeds of their Hampstead home to Tucker's alma mater, the University of Wales, Lampeter. As a result, there is now a scholarship and lecture theatre bearing Tucker's name, and a Fellowship in Poetry named for Dyson.

In 1959, Dyson, together with Brian Cox, founded the literary journal Critical Quarterly, described in New Pelican Guide to English Literature as "probably the most influential English literary-critical journal in the academic field over the post-war decades." Together, Dyson and Cox wrote Modern Poetry: Studies in Practical Criticism (1963), which became a standard text book for many years.

As a literary critic, Dyson published works on Shakespeare, Dickens, Samuel Taylor Coleridge and Sylvia Plath, among others.

In 1969, Dyson and Cox published the first of what became a series of five Black Papers criticising "progressive" educational methods and the Labour government's policy of replacing grammar schools with comprehensive schools. This and subsequent Black Papers attracted considerable support, especially on the right of the political spectrum. However, they failed to stop the comprehensive schools movement.

Dyson died in London in July 2002, after suffering from leukaemia for several years.

The papers of Tony Dyson and of his partner, Cliff Tucker, are housed at the University of Manchester John Rylands Library Special Collections. A further box of his papers is held at Lahore School of Economics archives.
