= Black Papers =

Series of articles on British education

The Black Papers were a series of articles on British education, published from 1969 to 1977 in the Critical Quarterly; their name intended as a contrast to government White Papers.

According to the Critical Quarterly website the Black Papers were:

...an attack on the excesses of progressive education and the introduction by the Labour Party of a system of 11-18 comprehensives to replace the grammar school...the furore it created led to the publication of four more pamphlets. Contributors included Kingsley Amis, Robert Conquest, Geoffrey Bantock, Jacques Barzun, Iris Murdoch and Rhodes Boyson. The Black Papers were not opposed in principle to progressive education, only to its excesses, which were rampant in British schools in the 1960s and 1970s. They criticised selection for grammar schools at the age of eleven and advocated it should be delayed until children were at least thirteen years of age. They criticised the student sit-ins which were damaging the reputation of British universities...The editors became leaders in a national campaign; today the Black Paper proposals for schools by and large are accepted by both the Conservative and Labour Parties in Britain.

The first two, both published in 1969, had the most impact:

- Fight for Education, March 1969, edited by Brian Cox and A.E. Dyson
- Crisis in Education, edited by Brian Cox

The Labour Secretary of State for Education Edward Short said in a speech to the National Union of Teachers in 1969: "In my view the publication of the Black Paper was one of the blackest days for education in the past century", but ten years later the Black Paper proposals were "at the root of mainstream Labour and Tory policy". Forty years later, Short however had not changed his views, saying of them: "These were scurrilous documents; quite disgraceful".

== See also ==
- Debates on the grammar school
