= Campaign for Real Education =

Right-wing education pressure organization

- Abbreviation: CRE
- Formation: 1987
- Legal status: Non-profit organisation
- Purpose: Educational standards and parental choice in the UK
- Location: London
- Region served: UK
- Chairman: Chris McGovern
- Website: CRE

The Campaign for Real Education (CRE) is a right-wing pressure group and non-profit organisation in the United Kingdom that advocates traditional education, greater parental choice in schooling, and less state regulation of subjects that children study.

== History ==
The CRE was established in 1987 by a group of 14 parents and teachers, although it was effectively a one-man organisation led by Nick Seaton, who ran it from a bedroom in his home near York. It gained national attention after intervening in a dispute at Lewes Priory School over whether pupils should sit O Levels or GCSEs. Two teachers who pressed for students to sit the O Level were redeployed, with one of them, Chris McGovern, later becoming a headteacher in the independent sector and the CRE's chairman.

== Aims ==
The group campaigns to "press for higher standards and more parental choice in state education". It opposes the teaching of sociology and politics. It has been critical of anti-racism and anti-sexism campaigns. In 2021, the group said a mock trial held by Welsh schoolchildren about a Conservative MP's ancestral links to the slave trade was "brainwashing".

== See also ==
- Campaign for State Education – seeks to promote comprehensive schools.
