= Circular 10/65 =

1965 government circular

Circular 10/65 was a government circular issued in 1965 by the Department of Education and Science (DES) requesting Local Education Authorities (LEAs) in England and Wales to begin converting their secondary schools to the Comprehensive System. For most of England and Wales, it marked the abolition of the old grammar schools and secondary moderns, and the 11-plus examination. Circular 10/65 was the initiative of recently appointed Education Secretary Anthony Crosland; it is sometimes called the Crosland Circular. It reflected the Labour government's view that the existing Tripartite System of education was flawed, and had to be replaced with comprehensive schools, which had been increasing in number over the previous sixteen years.

== Drafting ==
During the Circular's drafting, there was a debate in Whitehall over how strongly worded the Circular ought to be. Secondary education was not under the direct control of the DES, and all changes had to be implemented by the local authorities. Those firmly in favour of the comprehensive system believed that the Circular should convert all schools into comprehensives. Those preferring to preserve the balance of power between the DES and LEAs thought that the word should be "request".

== Release ==
Upon release in July 1965, the Circular used the word "request", but in practice, the DES used its financial muscle to weaken opposition to the change.

Local authorities relied on the central government to pay for the large number of new schools made necessary by the post-World War II baby boom. In Circular 10/66, the DES refused to pay for any new secondary school unless it was a comprehensive. As a result, a number of LEAs otherwise supporting the tripartite system, such as Bromley and Surrey, felt forced to go comprehensive.

== Withdrawal ==
Within days of the election of a Conservative government in June 1970, the new education minister, Margaret Thatcher, replaced both Circulars with Circular 10/70, which allowed each authority to decide its own policy.

== Sources ==
- Sir (George) Herbert Andrew KCMG, CB, Permanent Under-Secretary of State, Department of Education and Science (12 July 1965). "Circular 10/65: The organisation of secondary education". Archived from the original on April 6, 2010.
