= Circular 10/70 =

1970 government circular

Circular 10/70 was an attempt by Margaret Thatcher as Secretary of State for Education and Science in 1970 to reverse the effects of Circular 10/65 (sometimes called the Crosland Circular since Anthony Crosland issued it as Secretary for Education under Wilson in 1965) and Circular 10/66. The first circular requested LEAs to begin the process of conversion to fully comprehensive education, in line with the Labour government's wishes on the transition to a comprehensive national system. The second circular said that no funding would be given for new non-comprehensive schools. Circular 10/70 allowed LEAs to decide the future of Secondary Education in the area under their authority independently of the central government.

Although Thatcher did her best to show that she was not trying to discourage comprehensive education as a system, the withdrawal of 10/65 sparked some notable controversy. The National Union of Teachers was concerned about the implications of the withdrawal and the lack of consultation which had taken place before the decision: "On the implications of circular 10/70 itself, the deputation expressed the view that it represented an encouragement to local authorities opposed to comprehensive education, and an endorsement of selection at eleven"
