= Critical Quarterly =

- Discipline: Cultural studies
- Language: English
- Edited by: Colin MacCabe

Publication details
- History: 1958-present
- Publisher: Wiley-Blackwell
- Frequency: Quarterly

Standard abbreviations
- ISO 4: Crit. Q.

Indexing
- ISSN: 0011-1562 (print); 1467-8705 (web)
- OCLC no.: 317647332

Links
- Journal homepage; Online access; Online archive

Critical Quarterly is a peer-reviewed academic journal in the humanities published by Wiley. The editor-in-chief is Colin MacCabe. The journal notably published the Black Papers on education starting in 1969.

== History ==
=== Early years ===
Critical Quarterly was established in 1958 by its first editors Brian Cox (C. B. Cox) and A. E. Dyson. Cox's intellectual formation was in the Department of English Literature at the University of Cambridge, then dominated by the figure of F. R. Leavis. The latter's legacy was a notable feature of Critical Quarterly's early years, when it published work by a new generation of scholars including Raymond Williams, David Lodge, and Frank Kermode. In some respects the journal sought to modify Leavis's project; in particular Cox and Dyson felt that Leavis and his acolytes tended unfairly to ignore contemporary writing, partly because of their unshakeable belief in the "myth of a culture in decline". The early years of the journal were notable for the inclusion of contemporary poetry, and Critical Quarterly helped to launch the careers of Sylvia Plath (who won one of the first poetry competitions), Thom Gunn, Philip Larkin, and Ted Hughes.

=== MacCabe editorship ===
In 1987, after nearly 30 years of Cox's editorship, Colin MacCabe took over as editor, announcing some new ambitions for the journal in "Aims for Critical Quarterly". The Year's Work in English Studies for 1987 noted that "CritQ certainly had seemed for many years to be stuck in a rut, even if a pleasant and occasionally lively one, and one looks forward to the new team's effort to revamp the project entirely." MacCabe's name was at that time strongly associated with the (at times controversial) importation of various structuralist and post-structuralist ideas into the study of English literature, and - while largely sticking to its original ethos - the journal moved in more theoretical directions at the same time as expanding into adjacent disciplines, notably film studies, cultural studies, and history, alongside its more traditional focus on literary criticism. Its website now claims that the journal "addresses the whole range of cultural forms so that discussions of, for example, cinema and television can appear alongside analyses of the accepted literary canon." Under MacCabe's editorship, Critical Quarterly has published the work of Fredric Jameson, Slavoj Zizek, Jacqueline Rose, and Paul Gilroy, among many other prominent scholars.

=== Critical Quarterly book series ===
In 2007, Critical Quarterly commenced publication of a book series, published by Wiley-Blackwell, which includes books by David Trotter, Moustapha Safouan, and Ashley Tauchert.
