= James Moher =

British trade unionist

Jim Moher
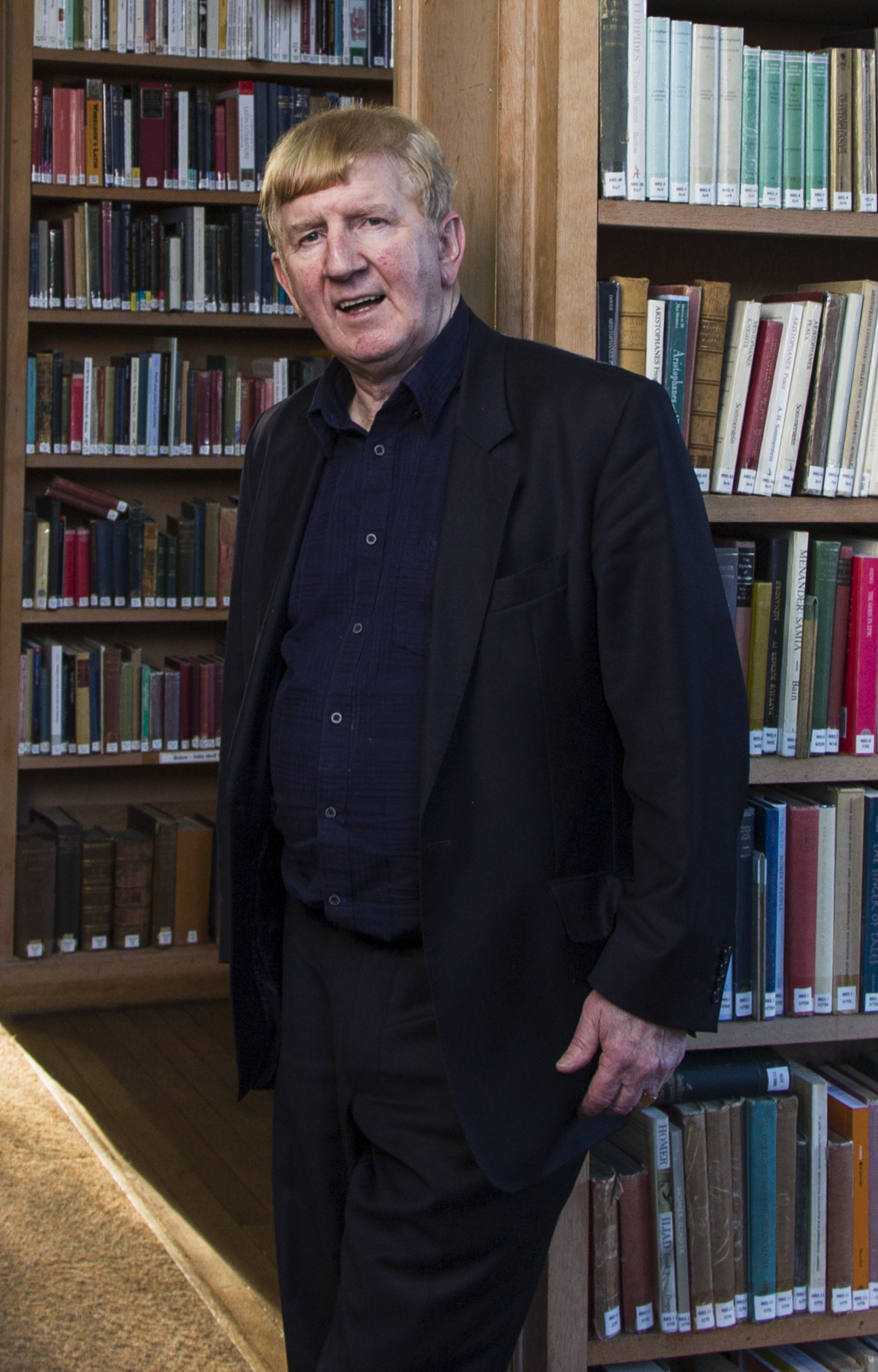
- Education: University College Cork (BCL); University of London (PhD)
- Occupations: Former official for TGWU; Former National Secretary for CWU; Former Local Councillor and Cabinet Member for Brent London Borough Council

Jim Moher was a national trade union figure with two major unions (Transport and General Workers' Union and Communication Workers Union) from 1974 to 2006. In that time, he served in a number of capacities - legal adviser and representative (accident and industrial disease claims); senior occupational pensions negotiator; National Legal Secretary; National Balloting Officer, National Political Officer and Employment Tribunal representative panel director. As the CWU's Political Officer, he was at the centre of their very successful political effort to assist Labour win the 1997 general election. He was also involved with the Labour leadership in policy formulation on employment law for government but was disappointed by their failure to reform most of the legislation against trade unions of previous Conservative governments. In 1995, his booklet, entitled, Trade Unions and the Law - the politics of change, published by the Institute of Employment Rights, reviewed the history of these laws and made some suggestions for significant improvements in workers and union rights.

Another interesting and developmental side of Moher's career was his long membership (1989-2016) of Employment Tribunals in Central London. As an impartial non-legal judge, Moher was required to broaden his perspective on industrial relations as he became more aware of the complex interaction of employees with managers at a variety of workplaces all over London. His legal qualification and union experience as legal officer informed his contribution to the Tribunals he sat on. A most rewarding experience which also later informed Moher's approach to writing on all topics.

As the National Legal Secretary of the National Communications Union (NCU) from 1985, he was responsible for advising and assisting the Executive Council and senior officers on all aspects of union legislation and all union branches, districts and regional officials involved in dispute situations. He became the National Political Officer of the merged Communication Workers Union (CWU) from 1995 to 1998, and with the General Secretary and Political Fund Committee, directed the union's General Election campaign which returned over twenty "union-sponsored" Labour MP's in 1997. He then reverted to legal duties, specialising in Employment Tribunal representation, training a panel of lay union officials very successfully until he retired in 2006. Throughout his union career Moher lectured to union activists at their residential education centres on employment law and political topics, on which he has written extensively. He taught union activists at Ruskin College Oxford from 2006–12, on the history of trade unions.

From the 1970s, Moher also became active in his local London Borough of Brent council scene, as he was concerned about many of the policies being pursued by what was generally viewed as a "loony Left" council. His involvement in tackling these problems led him to take on a pivotal role as Chair of the Local Government Committee in the Brent Labour Party. Together, he and like-minded colleagues helped restore normal progressive Labour business. Moher became the Brent North Labour Parliamentary Candidate in 1992 for the then "safe" Conservative seat, performing creditably. He was later elected as a local councillor and Cabinet member on Brent Council (2002-2014). His next book, "Stepping on White Corns - race, education and politics" (JGM Books, 2007), sought to capture the atmosphere and issues of a turbulent but significant period of London politics, which threw up significant national figures and personalities (including Ken Livingstone as MP for Brent East (UK Parliament constituency) and Paul(now Lord) Boateng MP for Brent South. It remains one of the first in-depth study of how race relations came to impact local and national politics in London during the 1980s by a participant. On the Council, Moher became the Cabinet member responsible for Highways and Transportation from 2010–2014.

Moher retired from the Council in 2014, to devote more time to research and writing and became a historian of social and labour movements. He had obtained a doctorate for his thesis on the early history of the engineering/millwrights' trade in the London area at the Institute of Historical Research and Royal Holloway College of the University of London in 1989. This was a part time study, but was recognised as original research and conclusions and so awarded a doctorate by the Institute of Historical Research, Royal Holloway College, University of London.

He became a visiting fellow at the Institute of Contemporary British History, King's College, London (2014 to 2025) and for two terms was also a Visiting Fellow Commoner at[Girton College, Cambridge]in 2016-7 (2016–17). He became a founding member of the History and Policy Trade Union and Employment Forum (TU&EF, in 2006, which brings together historians, union activists and others to examine past episodes of the Labour Movement with a view to influencing current policy. It is now part of the Institute of Historical Research (IHR)of the University of London.He became a Fellow at the IHR in 2025. To this end, Moher has been deeply involved arranging many seminars and conferences at King's College, London and other venues. They engaged many leading figures of the past in contributing their experience, memories and views on recent leading historical events such as the Miners'Strike 1984–5, The Wapping (Printers) Dispute of 1985, the Bullock Report 1977 and Equal Pay for Women. Their aim is to provide material from which the lessons of the past can be learned to inform the future policy of the unions and Labour movement. In this way it is hoped to reform the one-sided and unfair legal restrictions imposed on the trade unions since the 1980s. The various sessions are captured on the History and Policy website (historyandpolicy.org).

Moher has published books, pamphlets and papers in many of those topics: on trade unions and the law, both current and historical (the Combination laws); on London millwrights (masters and journeymen) and the emergence of the engineering industry in the London area late 18th and early 19th centuries; on the early aircraft industry of Brent in WW1 and the Airco/de Havilland aircraft companies in Kingsbury/Hendon, which developed into a major luxury (Bentleys, Daimlers) car and light engineering industry in north west London until the 1960s - his booklet entitled, Scourge of the Fokkers:The people who made the aircraft of the First World War at Kingsbury, Hendon and Cricklewood (JGM Books, 2017); on union leaders such as Walter Citrine and Ernest Bevin, in the heyday of Britain's unions from the General Strike to World War 2; on local government politics of race and education in London during the 1980s, based on Moher's deep involvement at that time ('Stepping on White Corns'.) Moher has also lectured on many of these topics, including to a large number of Chinese visitors about local government and other issues. He was Chair of Wembley History Society from 2018 to 2020 and remains an active member.

Most recently, the History & Policy Trade Union & Employment Forum and Institute of Historical Research, launched Moher's biography of Walter Citrine: Forgotten Statesman of the Trades Union Congress.(JGM Books, 2021) Lord Citrine was General Secretary of the Trades Union Congress 1926-'46. Lord Citrine, the first Baron of Wembley, was General Secretary of the TUC from the General Strike 1926 until he retired in 1946 and also President of the International Federation of Trade Unions (IFTU) from 1928 to 1945. In such pivotal positions, he had a major influence in transforming the trade unions from a collection of militant occupational bodies into becoming one of the most effective political lobbying bodies in Britain and internationally, consulted by governments of all colours. The book traces his early origins on Merseyside as a militant local union (Electrical Trades Union, ETU) official prior to and during the First World War. It explores his prominent role in the General Strike and its aftermath (his Diary of the General Strike captures the events at General Council and other level. It also explores his pioneering relations with the Soviet Union which he visited six times- 1925, 1935, 1941, 1946 and 1954. As IFTU President he witnessed the rise of Hitler's Nazi Party in Berlin where the IFTU executive met from 1931 to 1933. He was a member of the Workers Group of the I.L.O. from its inception and devoted much time at its Geneva headquarters to promoting its Conventions on labour rights. Based on this experience, his many reports to the TUC and the Labour Party and Labour & Socialist International during the 1930s are an important new perspective on well-known events, including the Spanish Civil War, Finnish invasion and appeasement policies of the British and French governments, which the TUC vigorously opposed. His role on the National Council of Labour from 1931 as joint secretary, was instrumental in changing the pacifist Labour leadership and party to favour rearmament to fight fascism. During the war, Citrine led the unions in forgoing their right to strike and other restrictive practices and fully participated in the production drive which delivered victory with their former trade union leader, Ernest Bevin (1881-1951), who was seconded to the coalition government as Minister of Labour and National Service from 1940. The book explores Citrine and Bevin's 'involuntary partnership' in considerable detail since their first encounter on the TUC General Council in 1925. Citrine departed from the TUC in 1946, disappointed by the failure of Attlee and Bevin and the coalition government to support the TUC's attendance as delegates or even observers at the inaugural conference of the Union Nations Organisation at San Francisco in 1944. Instead, he became a Director on the National Coal Board responsible for health and safety of mines and from 1947, chair of the Board of the newly nationalised British Electricity Authority. This 'second career', as he termed it, is also examined until 1958, when Citrine took up his seat in the House of Lords actively until the 1970s.

== Expertise and activities ==
=== Trade unionism and labor law ===
Moher possesses an extensive background in the development and practical application of labor regulations. His primary area of focus involves the evolution of the legal frameworks governing trade union activities, specifically within the United Kingdom. His perspective on 20th-century history emphasizes the socio-economic shifts driven by collective bargaining, industrial disputes, and the legislative efforts to regulate or empower organized labor.

=== Political commentary ===
Beyond industrial relations, Moher maintains a broad knowledge base regarding contemporary national and international political affairs. His analysis frequently integrates historical context with current events, offering a comprehensive view of political trends and their impact on the working class.

=== International education and lecturing ===
Moher has contributed to international knowledge exchange, particularly through his engagement with delegations from the People's Republic of China. He has delivered numerous lectures to Chinese visitors, focusing on:

- Local Government Structures: Explaining the mechanics of municipal governance and administrative responsibility.
- Public Policy: Addressing various contemporary issues within the British political system.

== Career history ==
On leaving secondary school in 1963, Moher took a post as clerk in Mitchelstown Creameries and the Agricultural Credit Corporation in Dublin but left in 1965 to emigrate to the UK, working on London construction sites (including the original construction of the Barbican Centre in the City of London) in order to raise funds for undergraduate law degree course at University College Cork. This work in construction provided an early insight into the employment protection provided to workers by the labour unions.

After graduating with a law degree from University College Cork in 1973, Moher returned to London to join the Transport and General Workers' Union under the leadership at the time of General Secretary Jack Jones, as a legal officer dealing primarily with industrial law cases such as employment cases, industrial accidents, and the support for workers suffering from illness as a result of their industrial employment.

== Education ==
Moher obtained his Leaving Certificate with honours at Mitchelstown C.B.S. Co. Cork, Secondary School in 1963. After a period as a clerk in Mitchelstown and Dublin and labouring in the London construction industry, he attended University College Cork, graduating with a degree in Law (B.C.L.) in 1973. Like many of that generation, he was radicalised politically and espoused a strong communist ideology for a time. This led to his life-long commitment to a trade union and labour movement career. Like many others, his thinking has evolved considerably as his involvement in the trade unions and Labour party, as well as research and publications now show.

In 1988, Moher completed a PhD at Royal Holloway College, University of London titled The London Millwrights and Engineers 1775-1825 This was a detailed study of one of the most important journeymen clubs in London and the surrounding area, whose members had a tight grip on the handicraft industry of the time in transition to the modern engineering industry. They attracted the attention of the Pitt government in 1799 and a Millwrights anti-combination bill, which was then subsumed into the notorious general Combination Act of 1800. t.

== Personal life ==
Moher was born in Ballyporeen, County Tipperary, in 1946. He was the third youngest child of Daniel Moher, a carpenter, and Johanna Moher (née Hickey) who was herself the daughter of a stonemason. In 1973, he married Ruth Hewlett, who was born and brought up in Sharlston, a mining village in West Yorkshire. She graduated from London University (Westfield College) with an Honours BA in English Language and Literature. She was a councillor for the London Borough of Brent from 2005 to 2016 (after a career as a social worker/manager) and was a Brent Council Cabinet Member (Children and Families) from 2012 to 2016 and Deputy Leader (2012–14). They have two children - Joanna and Daniel, and three grandchildren - Jamie, Grace and Sophie.

Moher was a school governor at his local Wembley High Technology College from 1974 to 2020, (including Chair of Governors for some years), which Joanna and Daniel, attended.
