= Brian Cox (poet) =

English academic and poet (1928–2008)

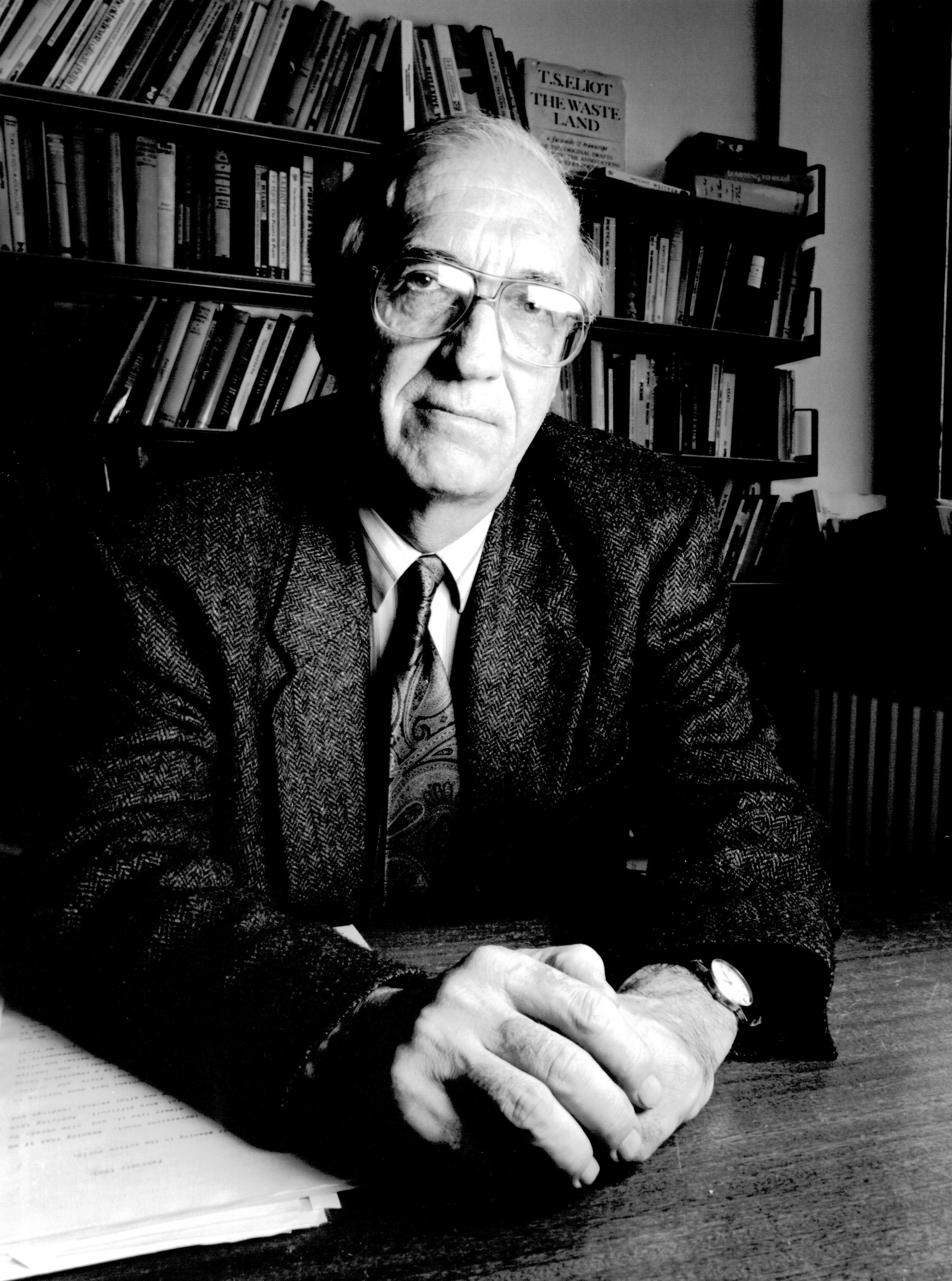
Appearing on Opinions in 1993

Charles Brian Cox CBE (5 September 1928 – 24 April 2008) was an English academic and poet.

Cox was educated at Pembroke College, Cambridge, where he received MA and MLitt degrees. In 1959 he and his friend A. E. Dyson founded the literary journal Critical Quarterly. English teachers in more than half the grammar schools in the country subscribed to it. The journal published five Black Papers between 1969 and 1977. These were controversial, due to their criticism of comprehensive schools and child-centred teaching methods.

In February 1993 Cox gave a half-hour Opinions lecture televised on Channel 4 and subsequently published in The Times as "The right is wrong on English teaching".

== Works ==
- The Free Spirit (1963).
- (with A. E. Dyson), Modern Poetry (1963).
- (with A. E. Dyson), Practical Criticism of Poetry (1965)
- The Great Betrayal (1992).

=== Poetry ===
- Every Common Sight (1981).
- Two-Headed Monster (1985).
- Collected Poems (1993).
- Emeritus (2001).
- My Eightieth Year to Heaven (2007).

== External Resources ==
- Brian Cox Papers at John Rylands Library, Manchester.
