= Grammar schools debate =

Ongoing debate about schooling in the UK

The grammar schools debate is a debate about the advantages and disadvantages of the existence of grammar schools in the United Kingdom. Grammar schools are state schools which select their pupils on the basis of academic ability, with pupils sitting an exam (called the 11-plus) in the last year of primary school to determine whether or not they gain a place. The debate on selective education has been widened by measures which allow a proportion of students to be chosen based on their "aptitude" for a particular subject.

== Context ==
A grammar school is another name for a selective school, a school that makes admissions decisions on the basis of academic ability. This is done by a locally devised exam known as the Eleven-plus (11-plus).

== Statistics ==
- In 2020, there were 176,000 children in grammar schools, making up around 5% of all state secondary school children.
- In the mid-1960s there were nearly 1,300 establishments, 25% of all state secondary schools.
- Free school meals are an indicator of poverty. Fewer than 3% of grammar school pupils are entitled to them, compared with 18% of the local cohort.
- Children who are not eligible for free school meals have a much greater chance of attending a grammar school than similarly high-achieving children.
- Grammar schools take a higher proportion of non-white pupils than other state, but have lower proportions of black pupils.
- In 2015 almost all grammar schools pupils achieved five or more good grades at GCSE and equivalent qualifications compared to around two-thirds at comprehensives. The gap is wider when the (including Maths and English restriction) is applied.

== Arguments in support ==
=== Individual successes ===
In 2006, according to the National Grammar Schools Association, pupils in England's 164 grammar schools produced more than half the total number of A grade A-levels in 'harder' A-level subjects than those produced by pupils in up to 2,000 comprehensive schools. Selective state schools produce some of the best performance in examinations based upon league tables.

=== Social mobility ===
In support of grammars it is argued that grammar schools provide an opportunity for students from low-income families to escape poverty and gain a high standard of education without recourse to the fee-paying sector. Oxbridge intake from state schools has decreased since grammars were largely abolished and studies have shown social mobility to have decreased.

=== More equitable ===
It has been argued that the grammar system helped bright working class students' social mobility. Chris Woodhead has stated "grammar schools have contributed more to social mobility than any other institution this country has known". Abolishing grammar schools may also be seen as attempting to impose a "one size fits all" education system on an area. The introduction of the CEM style test in 2013 was thought to improve social mobility further, because the exams became much more difficult to "tutor for", which meant that well off parents couldn't simply pay to ensure an exam pass.

Access to the best "comprehensive" schools is determined by the ability of parents to afford inflate property prices in catchment or feign religious affiliation; in contrast grammar schools offer academic rigour regardless of parental wealth or social capital.

=== School environment ===
With increasing concern about levels of classroom discipline, it is argued that comprehensive schools can foster an environment that is not conducive to academic achievement. Bright children can suffer bullying for doing well at school, and have to justify their performance to their social group. The grammar school, by insulating the more able, would provide a safer environment to learn. The National Grammar Schools Association suggest that the ethos of a grammar school could foster a culture high of attainment.

=== Parental choice ===
When parents in Ripon were balloted on whether to maintain a grammar they voted in favour.

== Arguments in opposition ==
=== Divisive ===
It is argued that the grammar school system is divisive and that the system leads to a waste of talent in those that fail the exam at age 11. Roy Hattersley has argued that there is an adverse psychological effect on pupils when considered failures at such an age.

=== National Challenge Schools ===
LEAs with a fully selective education system have a higher proportion of schools in the National Challenge, that is, schools that don't meet the government's floor target of 30% of students achieving at least 5 GCSE grades A*-C including English and Maths. Kent currently has 33 National Challenge schools, more than any other LEA in England. This is out of a total of 96 secondary schools, representing 34% of the total number of schools, higher than any other Shire non-urban LEA. Lincolnshire, which also operates a fully selective system, too has a high proportion of National Challenge schools, 29%, compared to 0% in neighboring, fully comprehensive, Leicestershire.

=== Class bias ===
Many opponents of the Tripartite System argue that the grammar school was antithetical to social levelling, that claims of raising social mobility were misleading, and that the intake of grammar schools is firmly middle class as evidenced by the low number of students on free school meals at grammar schools. It has been argued the current system benefits the middle classes who can afford private tuition for the 11-plus exam.

=== Regional and gender variation in opportunities ===
Practicalities, local political decisions, and historical issues have led to widespread variations across England as to the proportion of pupils attending grammar schools.

Similarly, the numbers of places offered to boys and girls varied not according to their results in the 11-plus, but to practical considerations about the number of places in girls and boys schools. In practice, such as in the example of Medway Council, where there were broadly equal numbers of places available for boys and girls, the 11-plus pass mark tended to be higher for girls than for boys and also favoured older rather than younger pupils.

=== Starving resources ===
Some research work (that was later retracted, see below) initially suggested that closing grammar schools would improve overall test results. A research report from York University suggested that the average GCSE performance of able pupils who go to comprehensive schools is as good as that of able pupils who go to grammar schools and that the existence of grammar schools depresses overall exam performance in an LEA. This report, however, was later retracted as the researcher deemed that there were serious flaws in data provided by the Government.

=== Failures of curriculum ===
Grammar Schools have been criticised for their negative effect on primary education. The critics assert that schools are subject to continual pressure to train pupils to pass the test.

== Political party positions ==
Political parties in the United Kingdom have taken various positions on the merits of grammar schools.

=== Labour ===
In general, the left-wing such as the Labour Party oppose selective education, whereas the right-wing such as the Conservative Party have traditionally supported it. In March 2000, following the failure of the policy to close grammar schools down by balloting, the then Education Secretary David Blunkett sought to close down the debate by saying "I'm desperately trying to avoid the whole debate in education concentrating on the issue of selection when it should be concentrating on the raising of standards. Arguments about selection are a past agenda." However, in his autobiography A Journey, former Labour Prime Minister Tony Blair asserted that the way grammar schools were abandoned in favour of comprehensive schools was tantamount to "academic vandalism".

Under laws brought in during the 1990s it is possible to ballot on whether to maintain a grammar school by gaining the signatures of a percentage of eligible parents.

=== Conservatives ===
Conservative Party support for grammars has been lukewarm under David Cameron who stated that the entire grammar schools debate is "pointless" and "sterile". However, support for grammar schools is more popular among Conservative backbenchers and Conservative supporters.

=== Liberal Democrats ===
The Liberal Democrats would not open any new grammar schools but would not close existing grammars.

=== UKIP ===
The United Kingdom Independence Party advocates the retention of all existing grammar schools and encourages the creation of new grammar schools and specialist schools, which would be called ‘professional schools’. UKIP states that they would not return to a pass/fail 11-plus test but introduce a ‘Comprehensive Test’ to assess merit across a wide range of academic and non-academic abilities including vocational skills, crafts and sport.

=== Green Party ===
The Green Party of England and Wales is opposed to grammar schools. According to their website "the [grammar school] system can cause social divisions. Evidence shows that the overall standard of achievement is higher where people are educated in mixed ability environments."

=== Northern Irish parties ===
Although the 11 plus exam was abolished in 2008 new unofficial exams have since been introduced. Former First Minister Peter Robinson a member of the Democratic Unionist Party has expressed support for grammars. Martin McGuinness of Sinn Féin had opposed grammars. The nationalist Social Democratic and Labour Party (SDLP) supported the abolition of the 11+ examination.

== See also ==
- German Gymnasium debate
