= Campaign for State Education =

UK national education campaign group

Campaign for State Education (CASE), formerly the Campaign for the Advancement of State Education, is a UK national education campaign group for an accountable, inclusive, and properly funded state education system. CASE demands a fully comprehensive school system.

The first precursor to CASE, the Association for the Advancement of State Education, was founded in Cambridge in 1960 'following the increasing acceptance of middle-income parents that they could be beneficiaries of a comprehensive system', and, by 1962, 26 similar local groups had united to form CASE. In the late 1960s, CASE set out to 'expose' Local Education Authorities (LEAs) that were seeking to undermine the Harold Wilson government's attempted reorganisation of secondary education.

CASE opposes Private Finance Initiative financing for schools, fragmenting state funded education by creating different structures and rules for schools, and selective school admissions policies based on ability or religion which exclude other children from the community.
