= Bernard Le Grelle =

Belgian investigative journalist and political consultant

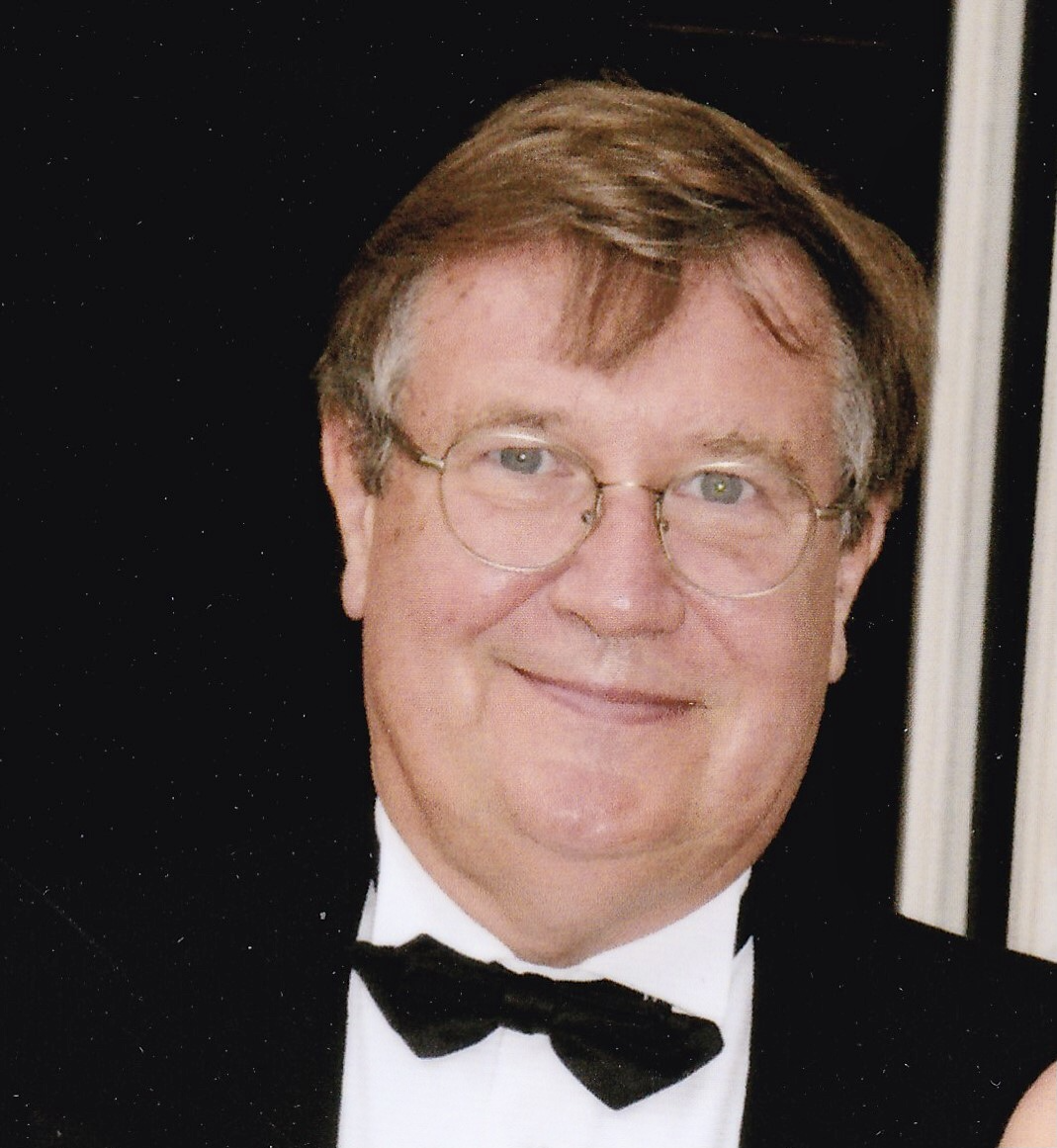
- Count Bernard Antoine Marie Paul Ghislain Le Grelle
- Born: July 7, 1948 (age 78); Aalst, Belgium
- Education: Our Lady College (Antwerp); St. Andrew's Abbey (Bruges); Saint-Louis University, Brussels; Catholic University of Louvain (UCL); Columbia University Graduate School of Journalism
- Occupations: Investigation journalist, political consultant.
- Relatives: Joseph J. Le Grelle (4x great-grandfather); Gérard Le Grelle (3 x great-grandfather); Monsignor Count Stanislas Le Grelle (great-granduncle); Baron Romain Moyersoen (great-grandfather); Ludovic Moyersoen (grand-uncle)
- Family: Le Grelle

Bernard le Grelle (born July 7, 1948) is a Belgian investigative journalist, political adviser, author, former United Nations expert and public affairs executive. He is known for his long-term investigation into the 1963, John F. Kennedy assassination. He is a member of the noble Le Grelle family.

== Inheritance of a noble family ==
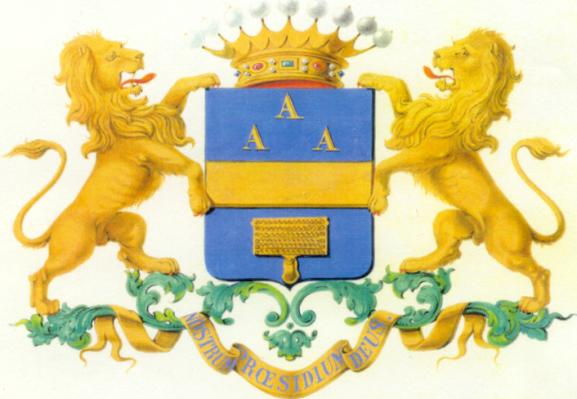
Family coat of arms

=== Le Grelle ===
Le Grelle was born in Aalst (Belgium) into the Le Grelle family, a wealthy family dating back into the 17th century, ennobled in 1794 by Francis II, the last Holy Roman Emperor. His direct ancestor, Joseph J. Le Grelle, founded the Joseph-J. Le Grelle bank in 1792 at the age of 27. The Bank was minting its own currency.

His son, Count Gérard Le Grelle, the first Mayor of Antwerp, member of the National Congress and the Belgian House of Representatives, saved the Vatican from bankruptcy and received in 1852 the title of Roman Count from Pope Pie IX. By order of King Leopold I of Belgium the title of Belgian Count was registered and extended to all descendants in 1853. Le Grelle's grant-uncle Monsignor Count Stanislas Le Grelle (Antwerp 1874 – Rome 1957), friend of Eugenio Pacelli who was elected Pope in 1939 as Pius XII, Master of the House of the Pope and Papal Secret Chamberlain played an important role in the Vatican.

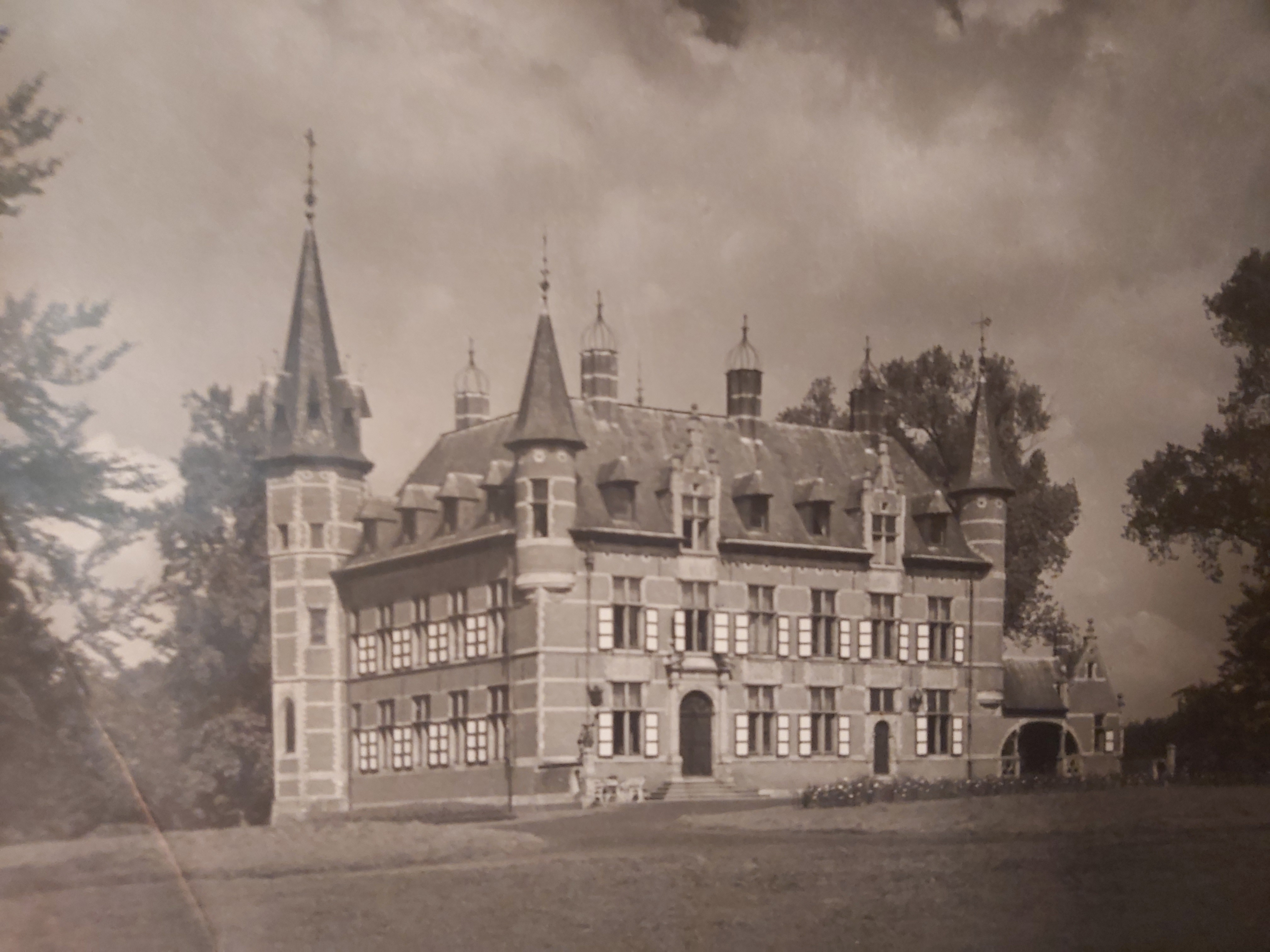
Selsaeten Castle in Wommelgem (Belgium). The family sold the castle in 1951, but Le Grelle father and cousin built houses on the 50 hectares estate.

=== Agie de Selsaeten ===
Le Grelle's grandmother belongs to the Agie de Selsaeten family. His ancestor, Pierre Agie (1757), came from France and launched in Antwerp a trading company, competing with the Dutch Compagnie des Indes. His son Charles (known as 'Charles le Chinois') went to China and became very influential at the Imperial Court in Beijing. He travelled all the way to Moscow and was the host of Alexander I the Tsar of Russia. Napoleon, while in Antwerp in February 1798, stayed in one of the Agie's houses. Charles and his son Gustave (1834–1909) were both Consuls of Russia in Antwerp.

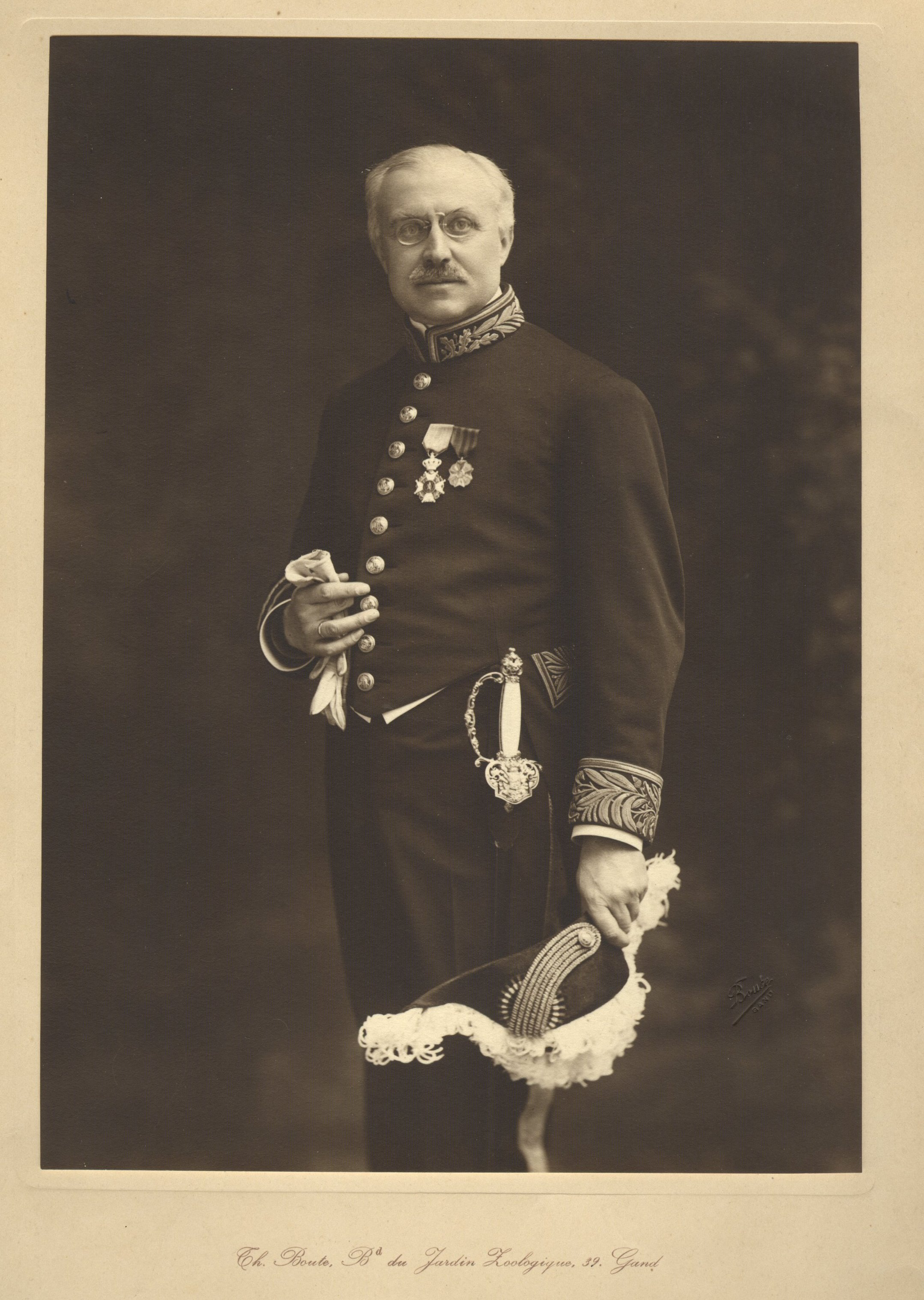
Baron Romain Moyersoen (1870–1967), President of the Belgian Senate.

=== Moyersoen ===
Le Grelle's maternal great-grandfather was Baron Romain Moyersoen, a Belgian statesman, who was President of the Belgian Senate (1936–1939), Minister of Industry and Economy. After the liberation in 1944, he was asked to form the government by the regent, Prince Charles, but failed in his mission (Royal crisis). In 1946, Romain Moyersoen was appointed Minister of State. In his book Souvenirs politiques (1918–1951), former Prime minister Count Henry Carton de Wiart wrote that in 1939, he told King Leopold III, that in those difficult times "the best man to lead the country would be Romain Moyersoen". According to the Belgian magazine Trends-Tendance: "He was without any doubts one of the most remarkable political figure of the first half of the XX century". His son Ludovic Moyersoen (1904–1992) was Minister of Justice, Minister of the Interior, Minister of Defense and Member of the Parliamentary Assembly of the Council of Europe.

== Early life ==
=== St Andrew's Abbey ===
After his primary studies in Our Lady College in Antwerp, Le Grelle was educated in the boarding school of St. Andrew's Abbey (Bruges). The very strict Benedictine School, where King Philippe of Belgium studied, was reserved to the Belgian aristocracy and the political and business elite. Bernard Le Grelle won the Lyons Club of Bruges contest for his essay on the World Peace.

=== Touring the world ===
Bernard Le Grelle started his reporter and writer career while travelling. After a trip to Syria in 1968, which ended in a Turkish jail following a car accident with an army truck, he travelled 17.000 miles from Antwerp to Kathmandu (Nepal) along the Hippie trail. From the Khyber Pass to Agra, Le Grelle was on the trails of Jacqueline Kennedy's Pakistan, Indian journey seven years earlier. The expedition got press coverage on departure and Le Grelle wrote a story for the Gazet van Antwerpen and for the Dutch, French and German editions of "Bonne Route, Goede Reis" magazine and for the German magazine "Die Schnelle Information".

=== Studies ===
In 1969, le Grelle got a Bachelor's degree at the Faculty of Economic, Social and Political Sciences (ESPO) from the Saint-Louis University, Brussels and in 1973, a Master's degree in Social and Political Sciences from the Catholic University of Louvain (UCL).

== First steps as a journalist ==
=== The 1974 class and JFK ===
In 1973, Le Grelle entered Columbia University Graduate School of Journalism. At this time, he began to focus on John Fitzgerald Kennedy, along with two of his classmates, Robert Pear and Zachary Sklar, who wrote, along with Oliver Stone, the screenplay of the 1992 film JFK. Kennedy and his legacy have influenced Le Grelle's since his early life, on November 23, 1963, deeply shocked by the President's assassination, he wrote a letter to Jacqueline Kennedy and received the funeral card of the late President. JFK has played since then a major role in his professional path.

Bernard Le Grelle is the author of the forthcoming book, "Two Brothers Executed, My Lifetime Quest for the Truth About the Kennedy Assassinations," which details his efforts to investigate JFK's and RFK's assassinations. He was recently invited by Jefferson Morley, one of the lead advisers to the House Task Force on the Declassification of Federal Secrets to join and contribute to "JFK Facts," an online publication with over 20,000 subscribers, a source of JFK information that is frequently cited by the New York Times, Fox News, CBS News, NewsNation, the Associated Press, and other news organizations.

=== From WCBS to the United Nations ===
In January 1974, Le Grelle was hired as a trainee reporter to work with Jim Jensen, the anchorman of WCBS Evening news. At that time, he realized the interview of the Special FBI Agent William F. Higgins, Jr. Le Grelle attended with his classmate Paul Brown the UN reporting and writing class at the United Nations with Kathleen Teltsch of The New York Times and Mike Berlin of The New York Post covering the 28th General Assembly of September 1973 and the numerous Security Councils convened during the Yom Kippur War of October. For his master project, Le Grelle interviewed UN diplomats and Ambassadors (Alexander Yakovlev from the OPI radio and television unit and a KGB agent, John Scali, who played an important role in the Cuban Missile Crisis of 1962, Ambassador Louis de Guiringaud, Carlos Ortiz de Rozas), and heads of States and governments such as Mobutu Sese Seko.

== Early career ==
Le Grelle started in 1973 as a consultant of the United Nations Development Program Administrator on a field trip to Peru to work on urban developing projects. He worked at the ITT World Headquarters in New York for Edward Gerrity, the executive vice president, who helped the legendary Harold Geneen build ITT into America's first global conglomerate, on an analysis of the Anthony Sampson's book The Sovereign State and worked for United Nations Institute for Training and Research (UNITAR) in 1974.

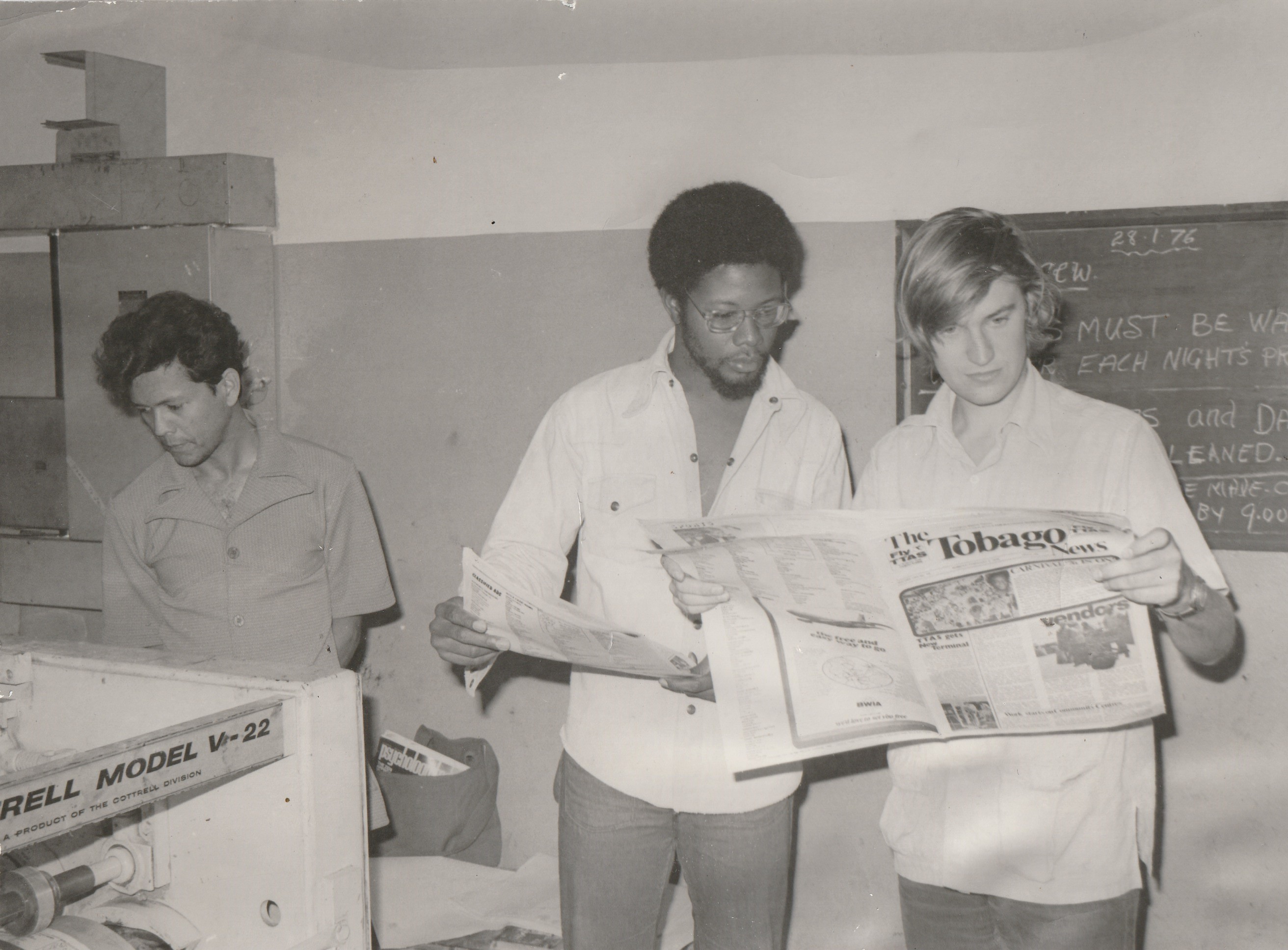
Bernard Le Grelle, publisher of The Tobago News.

In 1975, Le Grelle became a field expert for UNESCO in Tobago. He founded The Tobago News, the first and only newspaper of the island of which he was the editor (1975) and publisher from 1975 to 1977. In 1977, as deputy publisher of Le Nouvel Economiste in Paris, Le Grelle organized, on the model of Time magazine CEO's Business travels, an economic mission for twenty chairmen of French major companies, with a total turnover of 30 billion dollars and employing over half a million employees, including the banker Guy de Rothschild to meet with the new Carter administration. They lobbied hard for Concorde landing rights in New York.

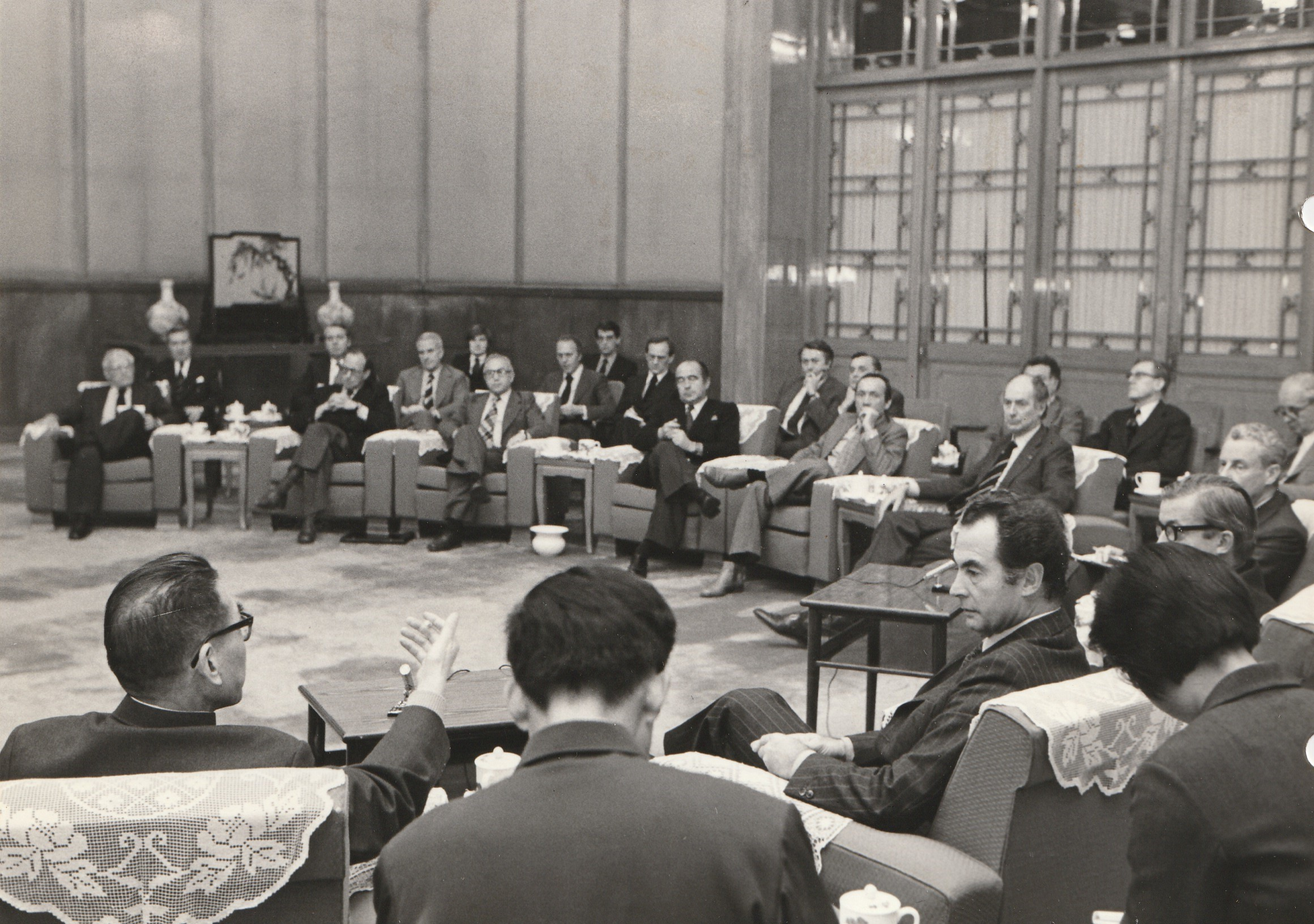
The French delegation of 17 CEO's of France leading corporations during their meeting with Vice-Prime Minister Kang Shi'en.

In 1978, he organized the first French economic mission to China since Mao Zedong and served as an intermediary between several governments, including South Korea, the Philippines, the United States and China, and major French industrial groups such as Bouygues, Framatome, Air Liquide, Air France, Accor, Essilor and Thomson.

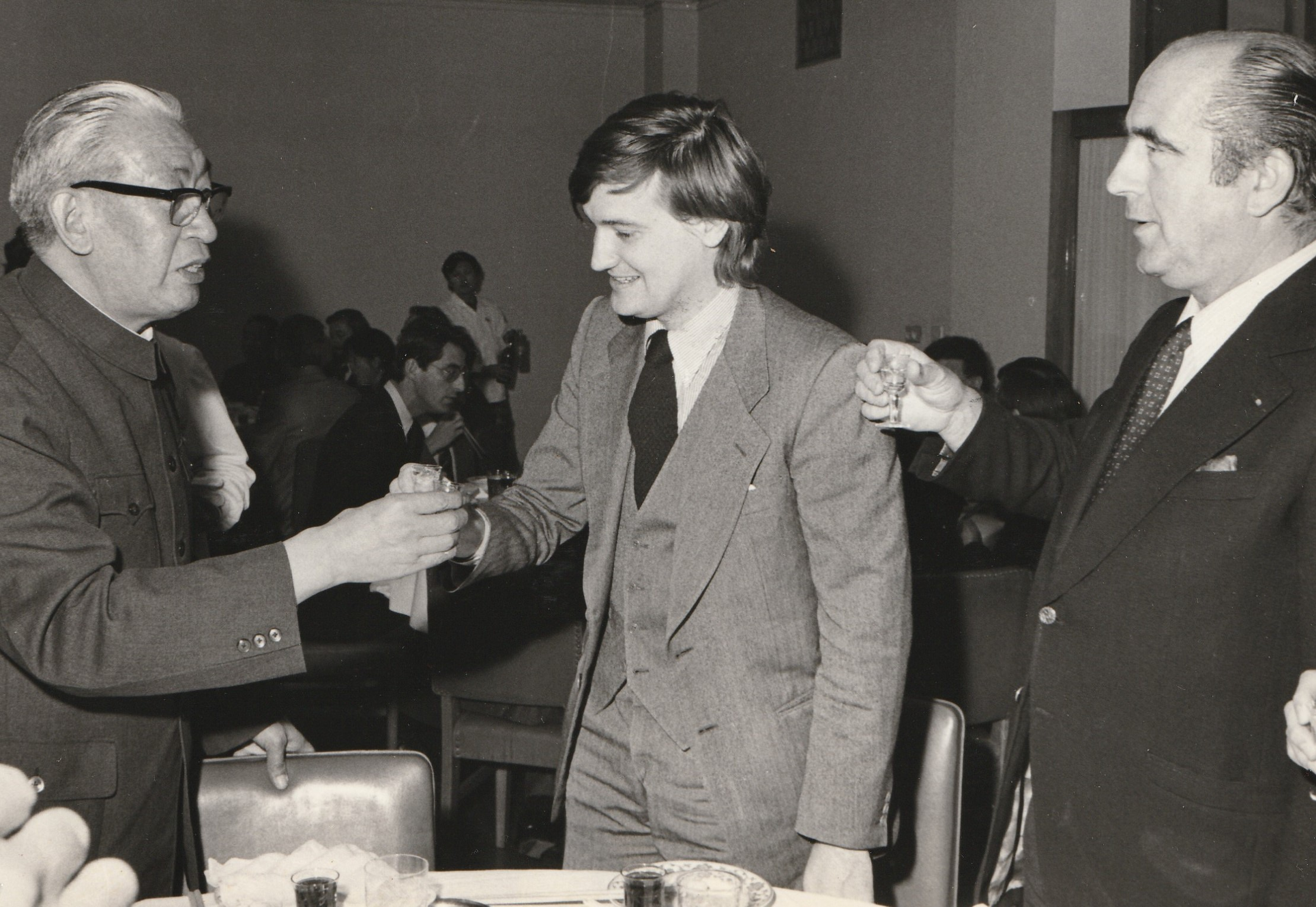
Bernard Le Grelle between Wang Yao-Ting President of the Chinese Council for International Trade and Francis Bouygues.

In 1980, Le Grelle organized a mission in Korea and the Philippines under the leadership of François Giscard d'Estaing special envoy of the French President. The visit had two outcomes: Framatome won the bid for two nuclear power plants and Francis Bouygues the 1.7 billion contract to build the university of Riyadh.

In 1982, with Lee Huebner, the publisher and CEO of the International Herald Tribune, he organized the meeting of 300 businessmen, bankers and diplomats from 35 countries with members of the French Socialist government including Pierre Mauroy, Prime minister, Michel Rocard and Laurent Fabius, Jacques Delors, Jacques Attali, representing President Mitterrand, trade union leaders, members of parliament and two panels of international bankers and industrialists. The conference was covered by 200 journalists from 21 countries, 17 radio stations and a pool of 19 televisions.

In 1982, Le Grelle launched with Norman Pearlstine, The Wall Street Journal/Europe and in 1984, Le Grelle launched with Al Neuharth the International edition in Europe of USA Today.

In 1986, he organized in Monaco an extraordinary Board of the American Newspaper Publishers Association (ANPA) in collaboration with Thomas Fichter ANPA's Senior Vice-President, Allen Neurath (Ganett), Warren Phillips (Dow Jones), Arthur Ochs Sulzberger (New York Times) and Katharine Graham (Washington Post and Newsweek). At the request of Thomas Fichter to organize a major event around the Mediterranean, Le Grelle invited Vice-Admiral Edward Martin, Commander of the US Sixth Fleet based in Naples. The Vice-Admiral and General Bernard Rogers, NATO's Supreme Allied Commander came to Monaco for a conference aboard the aircraft carrier USS America which came especially with its supporting unit. The demonstration was considered as an opportunity for the White House to state its policy aims to the American press executives.

== The American space program ==
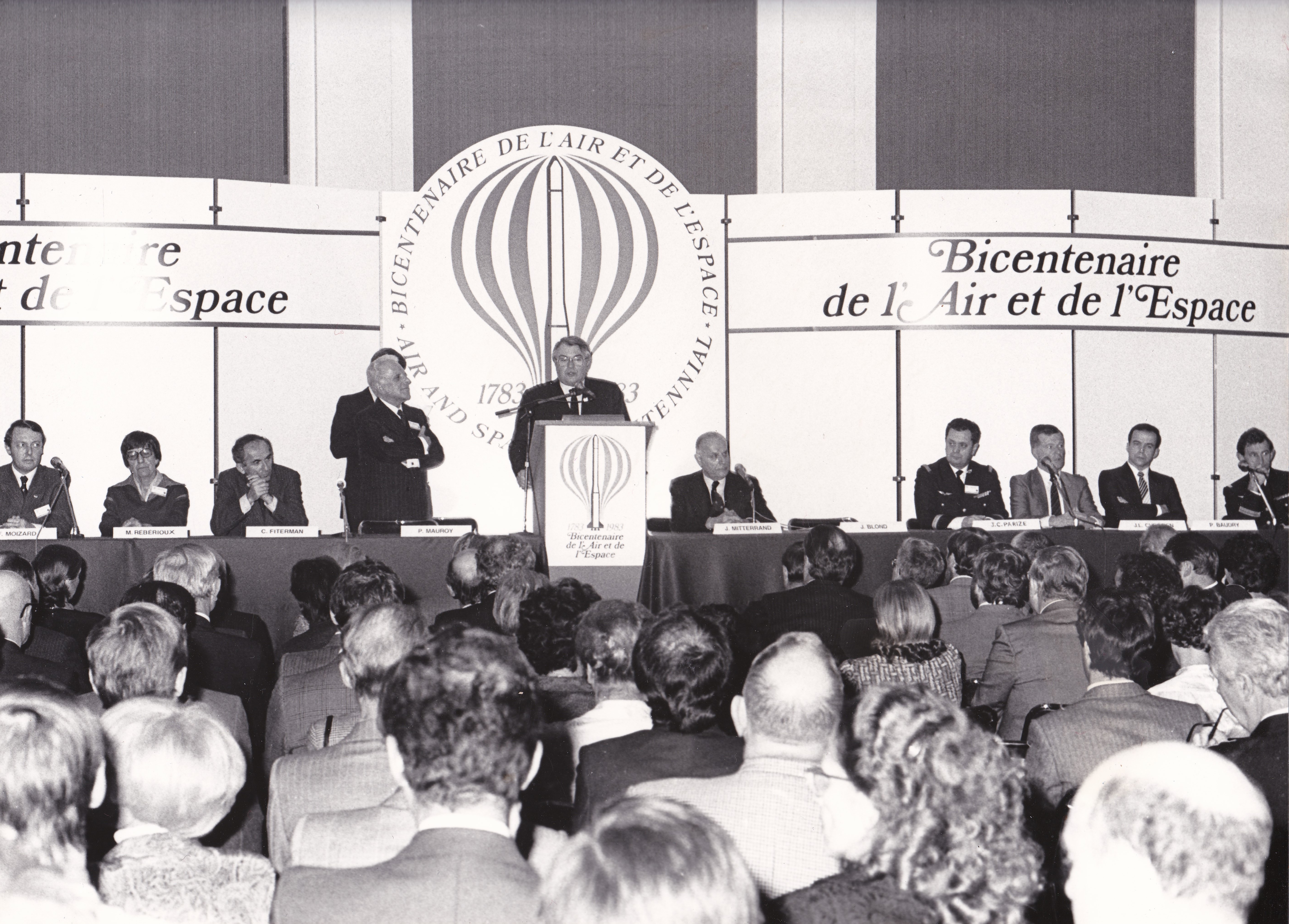
French Prime minister, Pierre Mauroy announcing the 1983 Air and Space Bicentennial during a press conference. Also on the podium, General Jacques Mitterrand, Minister of Transport, Charles Fiterman, astronaut Jean-Loup Chretien and astronaut Patrick Baudry.

Bernard le Grelle was appointed director of the National Air and Space Bicentennial Agency by the French Presidency in 1982. In June 1982, he was approached by Larry Mihlon, a former member of President Kennedy's space team, to set up a similar organization in the United States and became a founding member of the US Bicentennial Committee. The United States Organizing Committee of the 1983 Air and Space Bicentennial Committee included Senator Charles Mathias, appointed Chairman, President Ronald Reagan, Honorary Chairman and Vice President George Bush, Honorary Vice-Chairman General Clifton von Kann (Director), President of the National Aeronautic Association, Anna Chennault, Senator John Glenn, Senator Barry Goldwater, Apollo 17 astronaut and Senator Harrison Schmitt, Scott Crossfield, Apollo 11 astronaut Michael Collins and Walter J. Boyne, Acting Director of the National Air and Space Museum. On July 12, 1982, Senator Mathias introduced S.J.Res.270, a joint Congressional resolution to designate 1983 as the Bicentennial of Air and Space Flight. On January 3, 1983, President Ronald Reagan signed the Official Proclamation to designate the year beginning January 1, 1983, as the Bicentennial of Air and Space Flight, which became Public Law (No: 97-413). On November 9, 1982, Mathias, Mihlon and Le Grelle did organize a ceremony in the Senate caucus room in the Russell Senate Office Building to launch the Bicentennial Year. The event televised life, hosted by Vice President Bush included a taped message from President Reagan.

On February 7, 1983, a ceremony commemorating the Bicentennial Year of Air and Space Flight was held in the White House. The President spoke at 1:15 p.m. in the East Room to a group of leading figures in aviation, government, diplomacy, the military, and business.

Following the President's remarks, Senator Charles Mathias, chairman of the bicentennial committee, presented Walter J. Boyne, Acting Director of the National Air and Space Museum, with the Air and Space Bicentennial symbol which flew in space on a Columbia Space Shuttle mission in November 1982. The logo, signed by all four astronauts, was the subject of the first televised commercial from space when mission commander Vance D. Brand displayed it for television and briefly told the bicentennial story.

In December 1982, Le Grelle suggested to Senator Mathias to have a Space Shuttle at the 1983 Paris Air Show. The Space Shuttle Enterprise prototype was flown, in June 1983, atop the 747 Shuttle Carrier Aircraft (SCA) during the 35th Paris International Air and Space Show. The crowd was thrilled to see the Space Shuttle Enterprise arrive on "piggyback" on top of the modified Boeing 747 jumbo jet. By chance again, the commander of Challenger was astronaut Francis (Dick) Scobee, who had flown the 747 with the Enterprise shuttle and whom Bernard Le Grelle had met at the Paris Air Show in 1983.

In December 1982, Mihlon and Le Grelle came up with the idea of sending a female schoolteacher on the Shuttle, from which she would teach children a lesson from space. This would be relayed to all the schools in the United States via the public television network PBS. The project was named the Teacher in Space Project (TISP). It was announced by President Reagan on August 27, 1984. In 1985 NASA selected Christa McAuliffe, from Concord, New Hampshire, to be the first teacher in space. McAuliffe died in the Space Shuttle Challenger disaster (STS-51-L) along with the crew just 73 seconds after liftoff on the morning of Tuesday, January 28, 1986. The incident was broadcast live on CNN. When the explosion occurred, Bernard Le Grelle was aboard the Boeing 757 of Eastern Airlines bound to Miami, cruising at 39,000 feet above the Kennedy Space Center. Le Grelle, who was on the telephone with Charles Villeneuve, the managing editor of Europe 1 radio station, became the first and only journalist to report the accident live as he watched the explosion. The report was cited among the great scoops of Europe 1 Radio.

== Public affairs executive ==
In 1982, Bernard Le Grelle founded the first European lobbying agency and launched a series of world forums to bring business executives to meet with the head and the members of a government. Among others, he lobbied the security of the Channel Tunnel for James Sherwood and for the Strategic Defense Initiative (SDI) as an allied Defense Industry Co-operation.

In 1984, le Grelle became the European partner of Gray & Company, founded by Robert K. Gray, former cabinet secretary of President Dwight Eisenhower, deputy director of the Reagan-Bush presidential campaign in 1980.

From 1982 to 1986, Bernard Le Grelle, along with James I. Campbell Jr., advisor to Larry Hillblom, the founder of DHL, were instrumental in breaking up the existing postal monopoly in Europe, opening the way for companies such as FedEx, UPS, TNT and DHL to operate on the European continent.

== Politics ==
=== Consul of France ===
In 1976, Bernard Le Grelle became Consul of France in Tobago, appointed by Henri Chollet, the French ambassador in Port of Spain (Trinidad). He was in charge of the French Navy vessels from Fort de France, call port of the navy forces for the Caribbean (COMAR ANTILLES). When huge oilfields where found off shore, Winston Murray and A.N.R Robinson, were supporting a secession from Trinidad, their London representative asked Le Grelle to join a Shadow cabinet and to be Minister of Foreign Affairs. Le Grelle was directed by the French Intelligence Agency DGSE to stay out of the secession because it was supported by Cuba. He resigned, the secession aborted and the Tobago News office was raided by the police to find arms and ammunition.

=== Presidential campaigns ===
In 1980, Bernard Le Grelle was a member of the campaign staff for the reelection of President Valéry Giscard d’Estaing. When Steve Forbes entered the Republican primaries for President of the United States in 1996, Bernard Le Grelle joined his friend on the campaign trial in New Hampshire. Despite winning the Arizona and Delaware primaries and getting some significant shares of the vote in other primaries, Forbes did not secure the Republican nomination.

=== Policy advisor ===
Bernard Le Grelle served as a policy advisor promoting foreign investments and building countries' image for several Prime ministers, including Pierre Mauroy, Wilfried Martens, and Ruud Lubbers. He organized the official visit to the United States of Belgian Deputy Prime minister Willy De Clercq, Gérard Longuet, French Minister of Posts and Telecommunications in 1986, and Jacques Médecin, Secretary of State for Tourism and Mayor of Nice in 1984. In 1980, Le Grelle met with President Ferdinand Marcos of the Philippines to solve a commercial dispute between French companies and the government of the Philippines.

In 2008, as chairman of the support committee for the attribution of the Nobel Prize in medicine to Jean-Claude Chermann, main co-discoverer of the AIDS virus, he campaigned for the official recognition of this oversight with the Nobel committee by bringing together more than 700 doctors, professors and scientists (including professor Robert Gallo). In 2010, Le Grelle was appointed as Lead Consultant by the WHO Assistant Director-General for Non-communicable Diseases (NCDs) to be in charge of the WHO proposal to use higher tobacco taxes as a mechanism to promote sustainable health financing in developing countries: the STC Solidarity Tobacco Contribution. For this mission, his team worked closely with the Bill and Melinda Gates Foundation and with President Sarkozy's cabinet and wrote the first draft of a major discussion paper "A new international health-financing concept" for the G20, used by Bill Gates for his report "Innovation with Impact: Financing 21st Century Development" to the G20 leaders at the Cannes Summit in November 2011.

=== Security and antiterrorism ===
Since 1986, Le Grelle had regular contacts with the Presidential counterterrorist cell which was particularly active as Paris was the target of numerous terrorist attacks. Le Grelle became an informal agent for the Cell and had regular contacts and meetings in Washington, D.C. with the Senate Subcommittee on Security and Terrorism, with staff members of the National Security Council at the White House, with The Heritage Foundation, CIA agents and with personalities like Neil Livingstone, Joel Lisker, former head of the FBI anti-terrorist unit and chief counsel of the subcommittee on security and terrorism of the Senate Judiciary Committee.

=== Political clubs ===
Le Grelle is the founder of The "Cercle des Trente", meetings of 30 CEO of French companies and a French version of the United States Congressional Joint Economic Committee, the "Cercle Enterprise et Politique", which organized meetings with senators and members of Parliament of the majority and the opposition for business leaders.

== Climate and health advocate ==
In 2017, Le Grelle was appointed advisor to Linda Fried, Dean of Columbia University's Mailman School of Public Health in charge to develop a project to create a guiding coalition to build towards a decision by the United Nations General Assembly to convene a 2019 UN High-Level meeting on the Effects of climate change on health and to develop a strategy and process of collaboration of guiding coalition members, including the WHO, WMO, UNEP.

In 2018, Bernard Le Grelle became director of the World Health and Climate Commission (WHCC) project in Geneva organized by PATH, the global non-profit health organization. The Commission's mission was to focus on increasing investment and advancing policies, advocacy, research' education and specific projects to address critical climate and health challenges.

== Professor and guest speaker ==
Bernard Le Grelle was professor at the University of St. Gallen in Switzerland. He was also a visiting professor at HEC business school Paris at Sorbonne University (Université de Paris 1 Panthéon Sorbonne) and at CECA University (Centre Entreprise et Communication Avancée). He held conferences on lobbying and advocacy strategies for universities, chambers of commerce, professional organizations, the European Commission and employers' associations in Belgium, France, Switzerland, Austria, Spain, Italy, the United States, Zimbabwe and Nigeria.

== Memberships ==
Bernard le Grelle is a member of the Cercle de l'Union interalliée. He was an active member of the Rallye Vielsalm hunt. He is also an active member of the Cercle MBC in Geneva and Paris, of the Columbia Alumni Associations (New York, Paris, Geneva and Brussels), of the Columbia Journalism Alumni, of the CU J-School International Alums group, of the American University Clubs of France (AUC France) and he is a former member of the Young Presidents' Organization (YPO). Between 2002 and 2005, Bernard le Grelle was Vice Commodore of the Trophée Bailli de Suffren, a sailing race of traditional boats between Saint-Tropez and Malta.

== Personal life ==
In 2007, Bernard le Grelle married Karine Higounet, a French lawyer. They have a son, Amaury born 2007. They live in Paris and Cordon in the vicinity of Megève in the French Alps.

== Publications, books and films ==
=== Books ===
- Lobbyman, Le Pouvoir des Coulisses (Lobbyman, The Power behind the Scene), (Hachette 1988).
- Les Hommes Préfèrent les Myopes (Men make Passes at Girls wearing Glasses), (Editions LPM 1998).
- Tout le monde doit connaître cette histoire, Editions Stock, 2009, with Jean-Claude Chermann, Olivier Galzi.

=== Publications ===
- The United Nations Office of Public Information, a Reorganization Project (Library, Graduate School of Journalism, Columbia University, 1974)
- The United Nations Office of Public Information, pour une politique de relations publiques aux Nations unies (Université Catholique de Louvain, 1974).
- Report on Transmission Services for Urgent International Business Documents and the 19th Congress of the Universal Postal Union in Hamburg, Germany, June–July 1984 (International Chamber of Commerce 1984).

=== Films ===
- California 1972, 20 min documentary for Caméra au poing (RTB, Belgian television 1972).
- Katia (1994), co-producer of a short film with Lise Fayolle.
- Men Make Passes at Girls wearing Glasses (2004), screenwriter with Donna Smith, former Senior Vice President of Production and Post-Production for Universal Pictures.

== Gallery ==
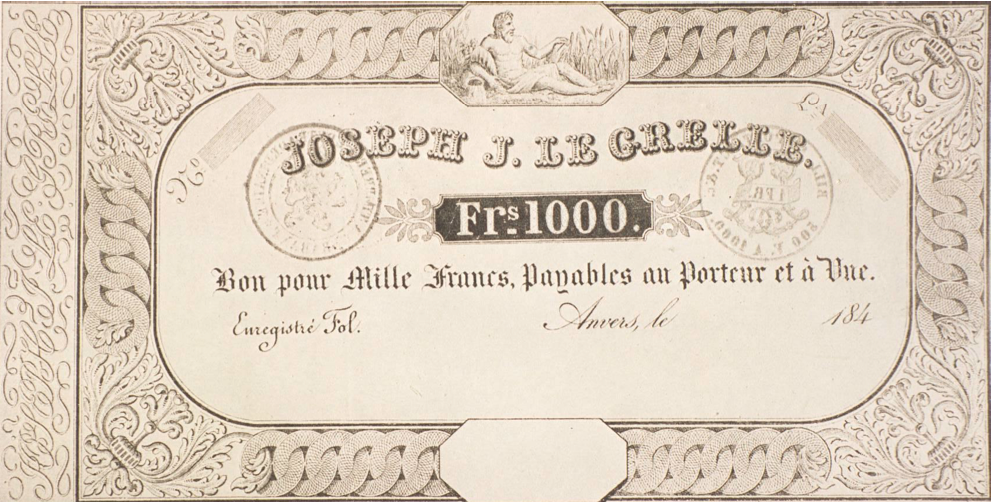
Bill of 1000 Belgian francs issued by the Joseph J. Le Grelle bank in the 1840s.

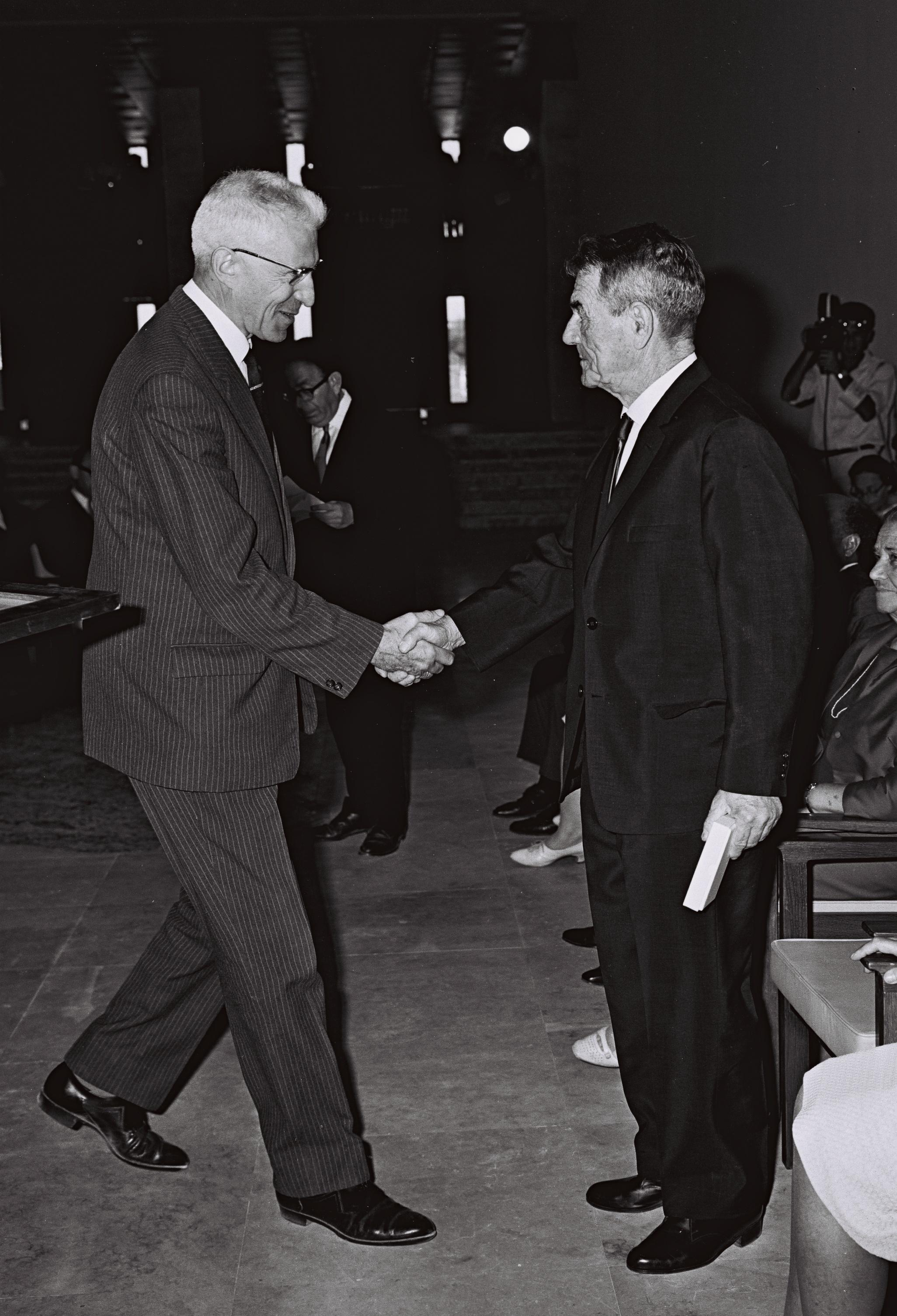
Knesset speaker Kadish Luz exchanging gifts with Vice president of Belgian parliament Ludovic Moyerson, in a ceremony at reception hall of the new Knesset in Jerusalem.

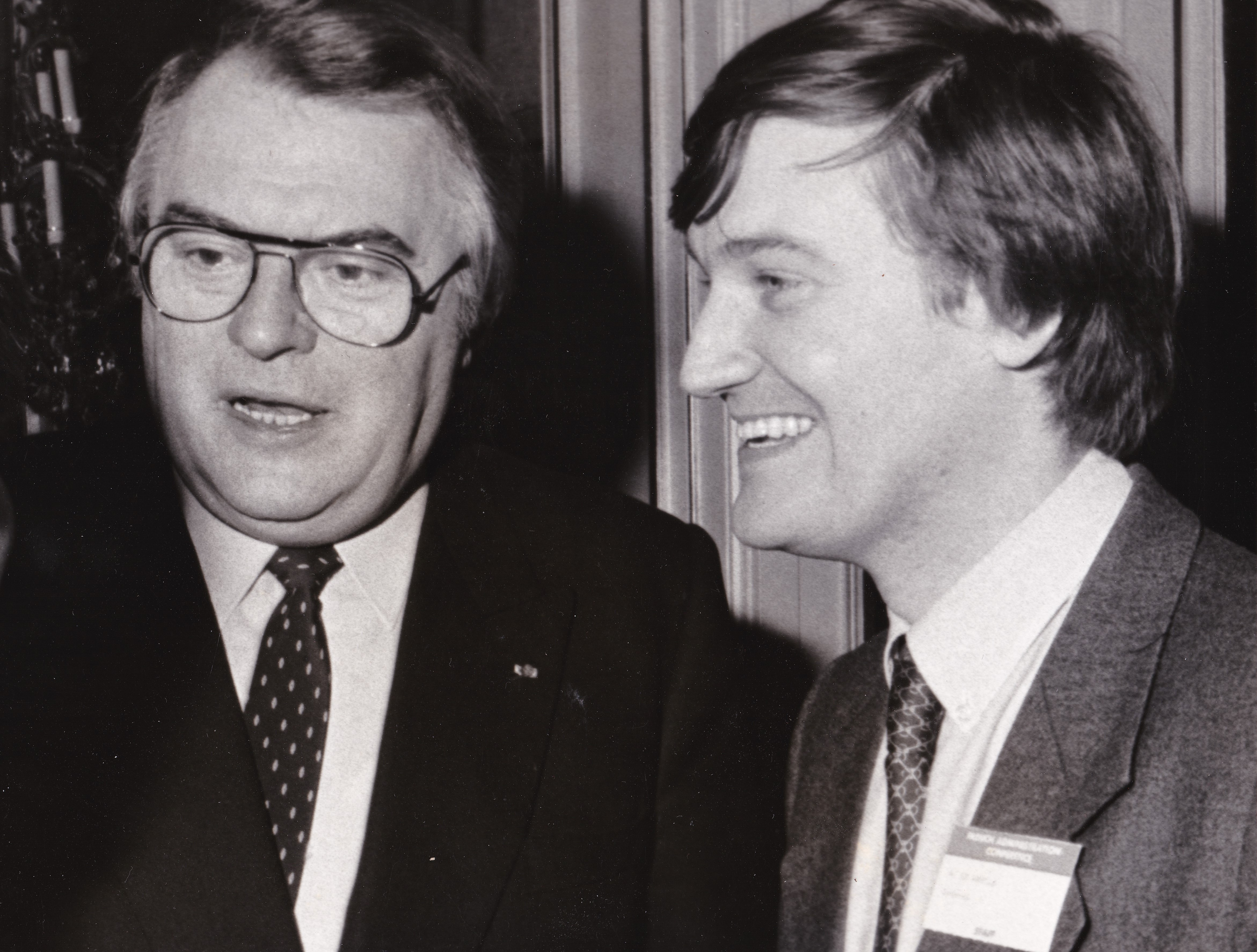
Bernard Le Grelle and French Prime minister Pierre Mauroy.

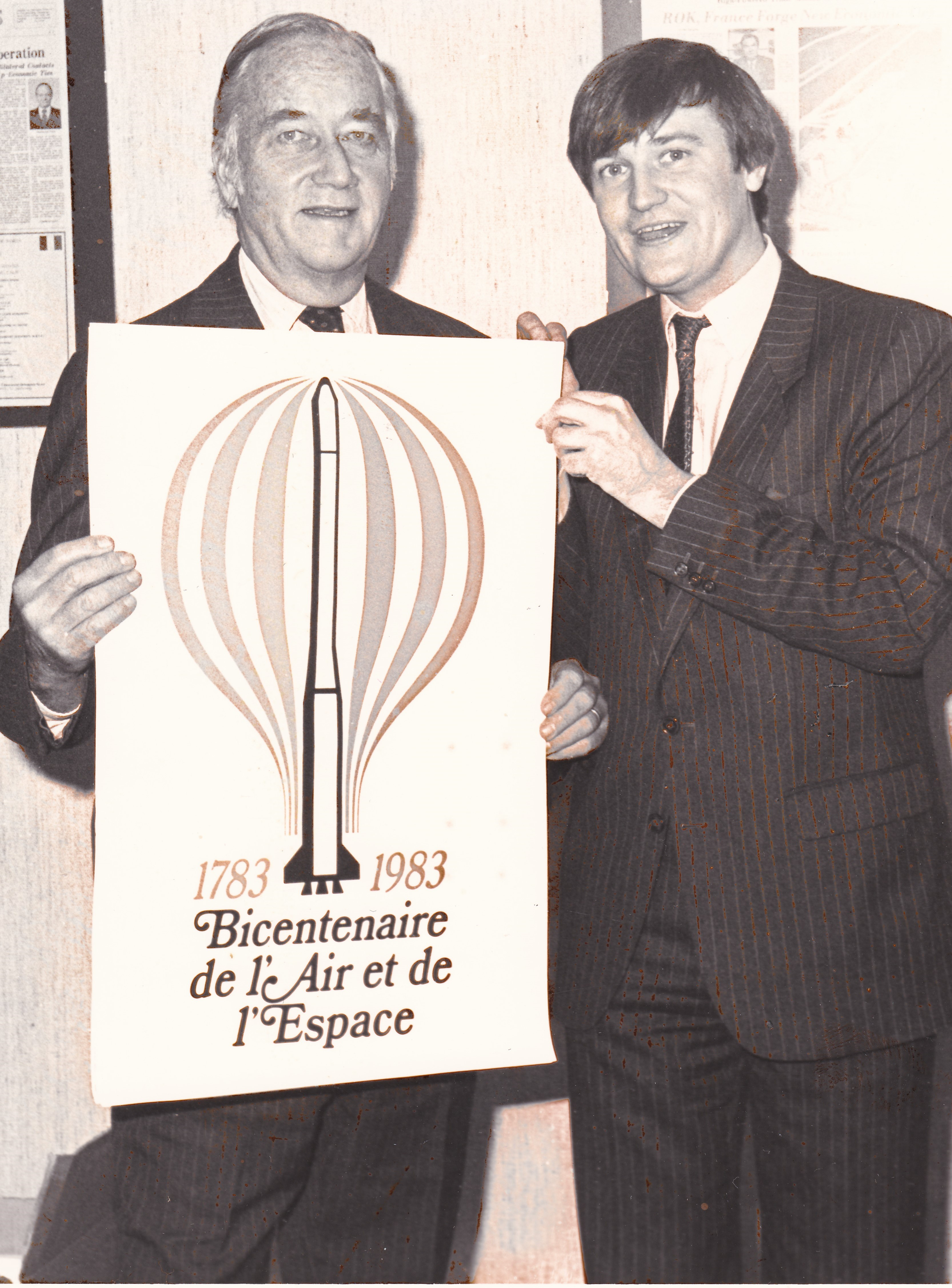
Senator Mathias with Bernard Le Grelle in the Paris Bicentennial Headquarters in December 1982.

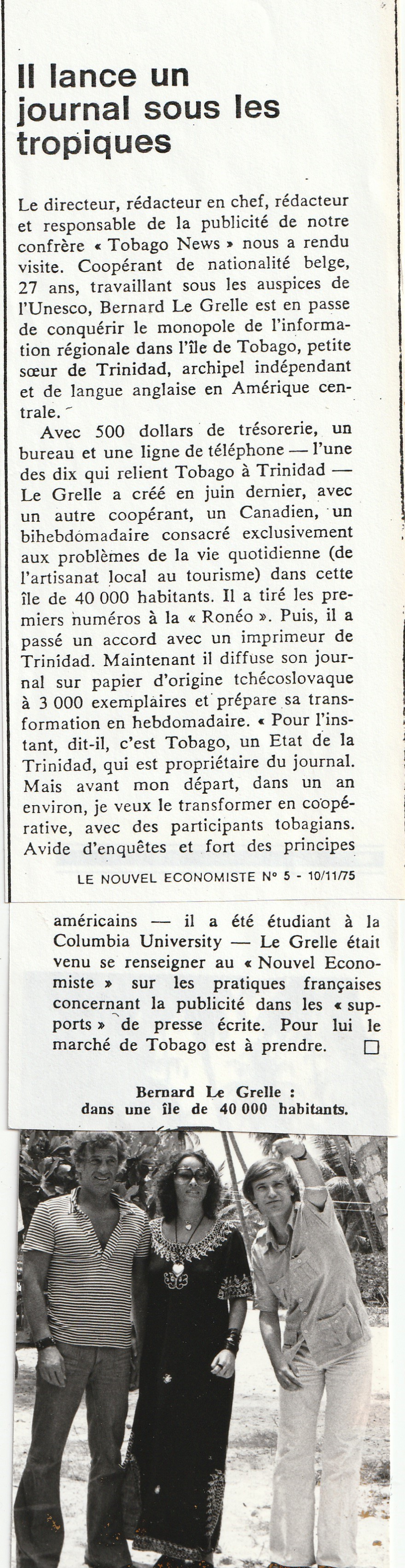
He launched a newspaper in the tropics Le Nouvel Economiste 1976.

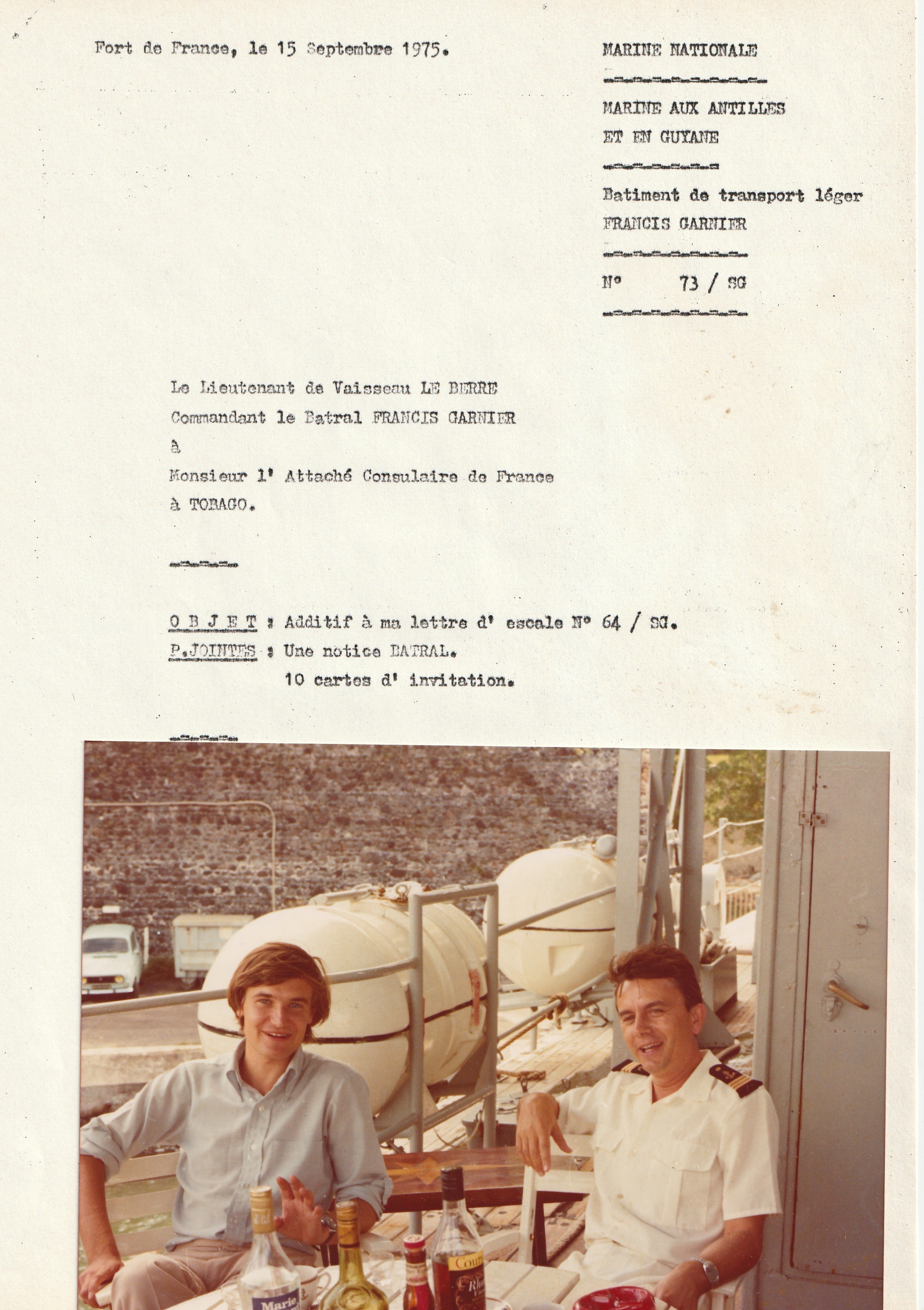
Bernard Le Grelle, Consul of France and BATRAL Francis Garnier.

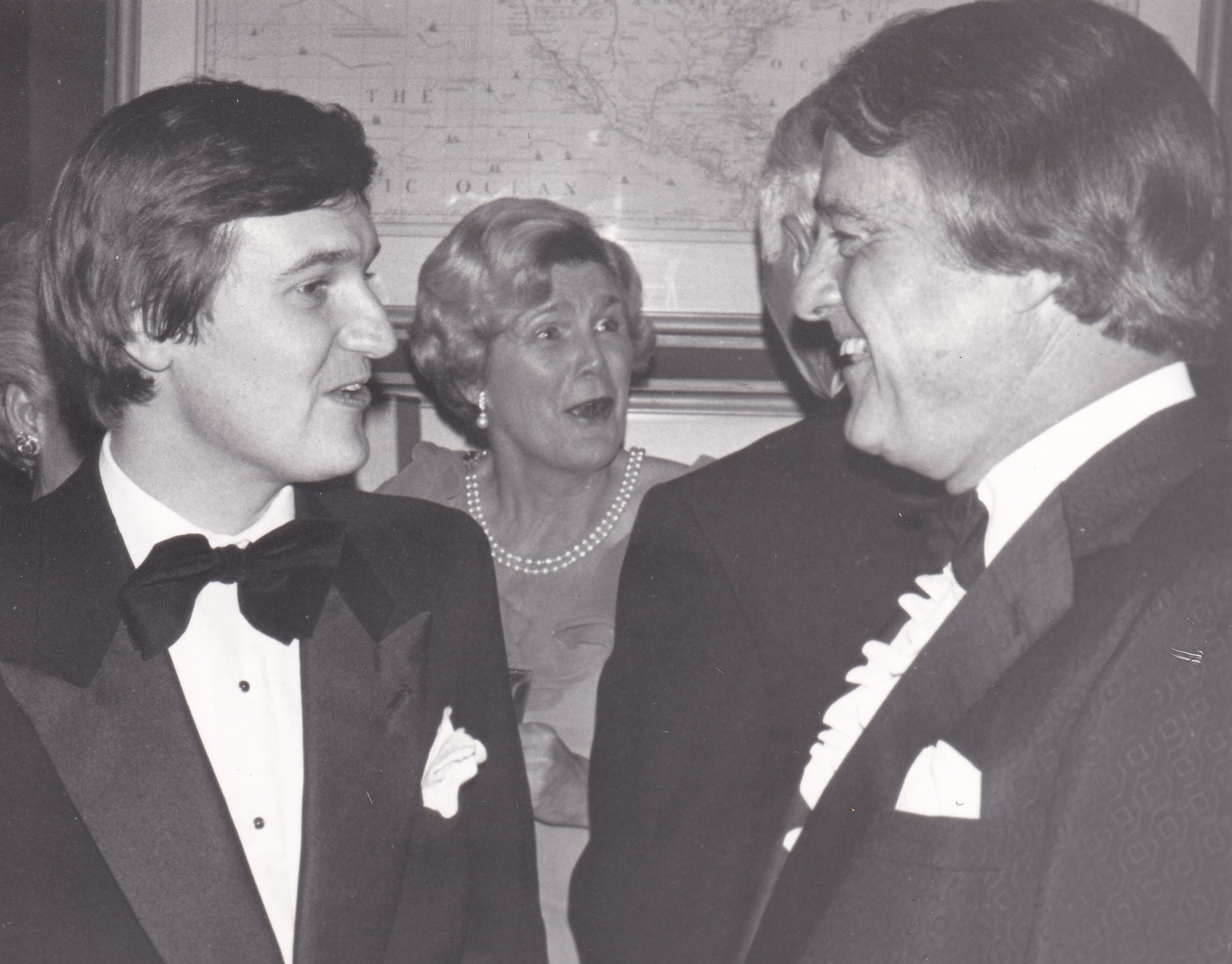
Bernard Le Grelle with Robert Sargent Shriver, husband of Eunice Kennedy Shriver and brother-in-law of President John F. Kennedy.

== See also ==
- List of noble families in Belgium
- Bernard Le Grelle
