= Andrew Feinstein =

South African politician (born 1964)

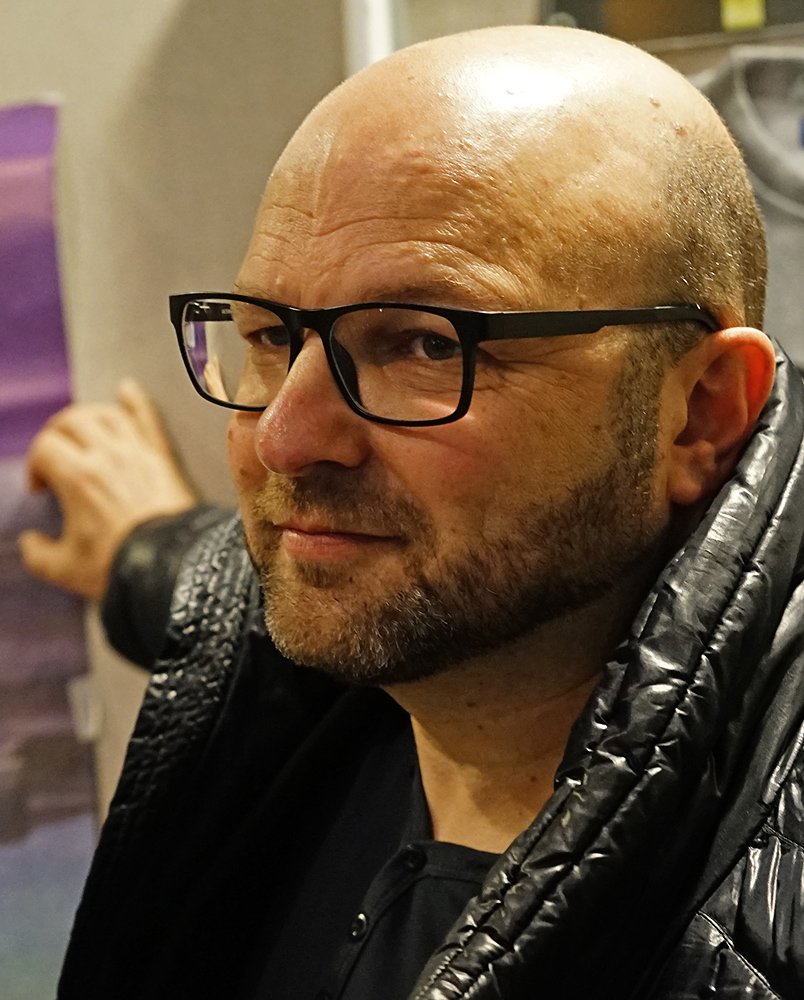
- Feinstein in 2016

Member of the South African National Assembly
- In office 1994–2001

Personal details
- Born: 16 March 1964 (age 62) Cape Town, Cape Province, South Africa
- Party: Independent (2024–present)
- Other political affiliations: Labour (2015–2024); African National Congress (1980s–2001)
- Spouse: Simone Sultana (m. 1993)
- Children: 2
- Education: Wynberg Boys' High School
- Alma mater: University of Cape Town; University of California, Berkeley; King's College, Cambridge
- Occupation: Investigative author, campaigner

Andrew Josef Feinstein (/ˈfaɪnstin/ FINE-steen; born 16 March 1964) is a South African former politician, economic advisor and investment banker, now activist, political consultant, filmmaker, campaigner and author, who specialises in the investigation of the arms trade and the corruption that accompanies it. He is the executive director of the small non-profit Shadow World Investigations, (Note: Corruption Watch Ltd, a company Feinstein co-founded in late 2009, changed its name to Shadow World Investigations in December 2019 and was legally renamed in 2021.) and serves on the board of Declassified UK.

Feinstein was elected in South Africa's first democratic elections following the abolition of apartheid and served as a member of parliament from 1994 to 2001 as a member of the ruling ANC party. He resigned his parliamentary seat in 2001, in protest against the ANC government's handling of the South African Arms Deal and exclusion of the Special Investigating Unit from the resulting anti-corruption probe. He then worked as an investment banker, and later became an investigative author and campaigner.

A former member of the UK Labour Party, Feinstein stood against Labour leader Keir Starmer in the 2024 general election in his constituency Holborn and St Pancras, and finished second to Starmer.

== Biography ==
=== Early life and education ===
Andrew Feinstein was born in Cape Town to Viennese Holocaust survivor Erika (née Hemmer) and Ralph Josef Feinstein, who emigrated to South Africa from London after World War II and whose views have been described as "liberal Zionist". Thirty-nine members of his mother's family were murdered by the Nazis in Auschwitz concentration camp and Theresienstadt, whilst she survived hidden in a Vienna coal cellar that Feinstein later visited as a boy. She was active in the Black Sash human rights organisation for liberal white women, while his father was a member of the left-wing anti-racist South African Congress of Democrats during the 1950s. She worked at a theatre employing racially-mixed staff in defiance of the apartheid laws and Feinstein met the young pianist Dollar Brand through her. Her wartime experiences and her work with anti-apartheid groups inspired Feinstein to become involved in the then-outlawed African National Congress (ANC) as a teenager in the 1980s.

Feinstein completed his secondary education at Wynberg Boys' High School in Cape Town in 1981; four years later he graduated with a BA (Honours) degree from the University of Cape Town. As a student, he took part in political activities in the townships outside Cape Town. He left South Africa to avoid conscription into the South African Defence Force and deployment in the South African Border War, and studied graduate-level economics and politics from 1985 to 1987 at the University of California, Berkeley. In 1990, he gained a Master of Philosophy degree in economics and politics from the University of Cambridge.

=== Political career in South Africa ===
Feinstein returned to South Africa in 1991 and joined the African National Congress, now operating as a legal party. A back room politician, he came to be known as the ANC's "Mr Clean". He took part as a facilitator in the negotiations to end apartheid, starting from the first plenary meeting of the Convention for a Democratic South Africa (CODESA) at the World Trade Centre in Kempton Park in December 1991.

Feinstein was elected an ANC regional member of parliament under Nelson Mandela in the first democratic election in 1994. He served as a member of the Gauteng Provincial Legislature, where he chaired the Finance and Economics Committee and assisted in the establishment of the Gauteng provincial treasury and an economic affairs department. He was an advisor to member of the Executive Council of Gauteng (MEC) for finance and economic affairs, Jabu Moleketi, from 1994 to 1996. He also worked as an economic advisor to the premier of Gauteng, Tokyo Sexwale. He replaced Marcel Golding as a member of the South African Parliament's lower house in 1997. He served in Johannesburg South until the 1999 election, and then in the former Sea Point constituency in Cape Town and on the Atlantic seaboard of the Cape Province.

Feinstein introduced the first ever motion on the Holocaust in South African parliamentary history. He stated that previous suffering – by Afrikaners at the hands of the British colonizers, or of Jews by the Nazis – in no way justified the brutal oppression of Black South Africans or Palestinians.

During his time as national MP, Feinstein served on the National Assembly of South Africa's Trade & Industry Committee and Finance Committee, playing a leading role in the ANC's finance portfolio committee. He was the ANC's official spokesman and ranking member, or head of the ANC study group, on the Standing Committee on Public Accounts (SCOPA) and became the committee's deputy chair. He also chaired the sub-committee that drafted the Public Finance Management Act (Act 1 of 2000) and was appointed deputy chairman of the Audit Commission. According to a 2020 interviewer, he had gained a reputation as "one of [the ANC's] most vocal and talented MPs"; a source in 2001 called him "the ANC's most outspoken and vocal member on the [SCOPA]".

==== South African Arms Deal ====
In 1999, Patricia de Lille, the chief whip of the Pan Africanist Congress of Azania, presented her dossier of corruption allegations against the ANC's leading politicians in the South African Arms Deal and demanded an independent inquiry led by Judge Willem Heath's anti-corruption Special Investigating Unit (SIU), receiving support from white South Africans. In September 2000, the auditor-general Shauket Fakie reported irregularities in the arms deal's primary contracts to the SCOPA and recommended a special investigation of the awards made to subcontractors. In October 2000, the SCOPA published its controversial 14th report recommending a multi-agency probe into the deal. Feinstein joined the SCOPA chair Gavin Woods and opposition parties in calling for the SIU to be one of the four bodies to conduct the investigation, but his ANC colleagues on the study group disputed that a November resolution by the SCOPA had recommended appointing the SIU. Feinstein was reprimanded by the ANC's National Executive Committee for questioning the government's "integrity" in the SCOPA meetings. He led hearings concerning the arms deal at the SCOPA and later claimed to have witnessed lobbying efforts by BAE Systems, backed by visits of the British prime minister Tony Blair, as part of the deal.

As a result of President Mbeki and the ANC's parliamentary caucus opposing the involvement of the SIU in the probe, and of his conflict with fellow ANC public accounts committee members, on 29 January 2001 Feinstein was replaced as head of the ANC study group on public accounts and the ANC's ranking member on the SCOPA by the party's deputy whip Geoff Doidge; the decision was taken at a meeting of ANC MPs chaired by the party chief whip Tony Yengeni, who had been named in the de Lille dossier. Feinstein vowed to stay on the SCOPA and push for an independent investigation, saying that at stake were issues "far bigger than [his] own position", such as "the accountability of the executive to the legislature". However, after being limited by his colleagues in the ANC study group to speaking in the committee with their prior approval, he refused to attend the meetings and vote in them, for which he was reported to chief whip Yengeni. In June 2001, he abstained on the ANC's controversial motion of confidence in the National Assembly speaker Frene Ginwala and came to face disciplinary action that could have included expulsion from the party.

On 30 August 2001, Feinstein resigned from the National Assembly in protest against the government's handling of the arms deal and the investigation, citing the affair's alleged impact on "national reconciliation", "sound economic management" and "delivery on key social needs". He accused the government and the ANC of interfering with the parliamentary process, but blamed the breakdown of the SCOPA as a non-partisan body on both government and opposition parties and declared his intention to remain a member of the ANC. He welcomed the arrest of Tony Yengeni in October 2001, but by 2007 criticised the joint investigation report on the arms deal submitted by the three agencies to the parliament in November 2001 as "weak and incomplete". In November 2001, he accepted to meet with minister of finance Trevor Manuel, who was rumoured to have opposed the arms deal due to concerns over "fiscal stability"; he alleged in 2007 that Manuel told him to "let [the affair] lie", which Manuel denied in 2014.

=== Post-parliamentary career in the United Kingdom ===
Following his resignation, Feinstein received offers of employment from the private sector. He moved to London and in January 2002 took up a senior managerial position in the organisation development unit of the Anglo-South African banking group Investec, where he worked until 2007.

Feinstein chaired the London-based charity Friends of the Treatment Action Campaign, the UK arm of the South African AIDS activist organisation patronised by Desmond Tutu, Gillian Slovo and Glenys Kinnock that started out campaigning against the alleged AIDS denialism of President Mbeki. FOTAC was launched in October 2005 and wound down in February 2016. Feinstein's deputy was Oliver Phillips of the Britain–Zimbabwe Society.

Feinstein's 2007 memoir After the Party criticised the political culture of the ANC and was reported to "present the ANC itself as the problem", with President Thabo Mbeki as "chief villain" and Jacob Zuma escaping direct condemnation. Feinstein argued in the book that the ill-fated arms deal was the "point at which the ANC lost its moral compass". He traveled to Cape Town to launch the book in 2007. Although he remained a member of the ANC as of 2007, he was now labelled the party's "opponent". The ANC's response to the book alleged that Feinstein had "concocted shameless fabrications to invent corrupt practices around the so-called arms deal", but the party ignored Feinstein's challenge for it to sue him and only sought to discourage the use of his book by South African journalists. Following a complaint by Trevor Manuel, Feinstein removed the claim that Manuel had recommended denying therapy to HIV-positive South Africans at a secret parliamentary meeting from the book.

After the Party achieved commercial success in South Africa and Feinstein left Investec to focus on writing and campaigning. By the end of 2007, he had started his own consultancy. An international edition of the book was published in 2009.

In January 2010, Feinstein launched the non-governmental organization Corruption Watch UK (renamed to Shadow World Investigations in 2021) jointly with Susan Hawley, the founder and later executive director of Spotlight on Corruption. As of 2025, he is the executive director of the organisation.

From January 2010 to July 2011, Feinstein was an Open Society International Fellow while writing his second book, The Shadow World (2011). He also held a fellowship at the Rockefeller Foundation's Bellagio Center in Italy and participated in the Distinguished Visitors Programme at the London School of Economics.

By 2021, Feinstein became an associate in Greg Power's London-based political consultancy non-profit Global Partners Governance (described in 2014 as "a privileged contractor to the Foreign Office for consulting missions in the Middle East"), after featuring in the organisation's podcast in 2017.

In early 2025, Feinstein joined the board of Declassified UK, an investigative journalism website set up in 2019 by Matt Kennard and Mark Curtis to cover the UK's role on the international stage.

Feinstein has filed parliamentary submissions of evidence in the United Kingdom, the European Union, and multiple European, Middle Eastern and African countries.

=== Political involvement in the United Kingdom ===
==== Labour Party ====
Shortly after arriving in the United Kingdom, Feinstein rejected proposals to join the Labour Party and run as its candidate for the parliament. He became a member of Labour during the 2015 leadership election to support Jeremy Corbyn's winning bid. In December 2019, along with 42 other leading cultural figures, Feinstein signed a letter endorsing the Labour Party under Corbyn's leadership in the 2019 general election. The letter stated that "Labour's election manifesto under Jeremy Corbyn's leadership offers a transformative plan that prioritises the needs of people and the planet over private profit and the vested interests of a few."

Feinstein spoke at various events organised by the Labour Against the Witchhunt campaign, criticising the allegations of antisemitism in the British Labour Party under Jeremy Corbyn's leadership as politically motivated.

In December 2020, Feinstein described Keir Starmer, Corbyn's successor as the Labour Party leader, as "inauthentic" and "severely lacking in charisma". After leaving the party, he remained highly critical of Starmer and the direction Labour had taken under Starmer's leadership, accusing Starmer of, among other things, being "terrible on Gaza".

==== Independent candidacy and Camden People's Alliance ====
In February 2024, it was announced that Feinstein was preparing to stand against Starmer in his constituency of Holborn and St. Pancras as an independent at the next general election, endorsed by two grassroots organisations: the Organise Corbyn Inspired Socialist Alliance controlled by Richard James Breese Conod and the For the Many Network founded by Feinstein in 2023 with Ken Loach, BFAWU's Ian Hodson and Audrey White. He launched his campaign, which he described as community-driven, on 21 May, with a reported budget of c.£21,000, and received active support from members of the left-wing party Collective founded by Karie Murphy. He ran on a platform of supporting "prosperity and equality", opposing "austerity and corruption", advocating for increased public spending and an end to NHS privatisation, and demanding unqualified diplomatic recognition of Palestine by the UK and a halt to the Gaza genocide. In the general election on 4 July 2024, Feinstein finished second, with 7,312 votes to Starmer's 18,884.

Off the back of his electoral campaign, Feinstein built the Camden Community Alliance, a grassroots movement and local pressure group launched by November 2024, for which he acts as "the face" and which has struck partnerships with Jamie Driscoll's Majority and with the grassroots union alliance Acorn International.

In September 2025, Feinstein launched his 2026 local elections campaign for a seat in the Camden London Borough Council under the banner of the Camden People's Alliance in coordination with both the Green Party and Your Party, with the Gaza war and affordable housing as key concerns.

==== Collective and Your Party ====
During the private meetings of Collective in the autumn of 2024, Feinstein emerged alongside Jeremy Corbyn, Lutfur Rahman and Salma Yaqoob as one the proposed leaders of a new left-wing political formation, later known by the interim name of Your Party. He and Jamie Driscoll formed a faction opposed to Karie Murphy and the former Unite the Union head Len McCluskey that argued for a grassroots localist federation-type movement rooted in citizens' assemblies, responding to post-political concerns and geared towards independent electoral candidates (an organisational model said to be close to Corbyn's preferred solution). In September 2024, Feinstein's faction sought to delay the formation of a new party.

In April 2025, together with Driscoll and Beth Winter, Feinstein became a co-director of the company MoU Operations Limited, formed to control data for the planned new party, and as a challenge to Karie Murphy's leadership in Collective. In May 2025, he took part in negotiations over the launch of the new party, defending their secrecy and calling for a non-party structure in order to "appeal to people who do not already think like us and come to our meetings".

On 3 July 2025, at an online meeting of Collective's informal organising committee, Feinstein submitted a motion proposing to invite Zarah Sultana to leave Labour and join the new party as an "interim co-leader" with Corbyn. The motion, which also described the party as "a vehicle for community power", was voted through by his allies including the meeting's chair Salma Yaqoob, as Corbyn and his team, who opposed it, refused to vote on the grounds that the meeting did not have a democratic mandate for constitutional decisions about the future party. The victory claimed by Feinstein's group led to Sultana's public announcement of Your Party and her claim to joint leadership on the same evening. Despite the conflict, Feinstein and Corbyn appeared together at an event supporting Leanne Mohamad in Ilford on 4 July. In August, Feinstein addressed the first meeting of a Your Party branch in Sheffield. In September 2025, Feinstein's MoU Operations collected fees from the initial controversial membership launch by Sultana, which saw 22,000 sign up. Two days after the resulting new clash between Corbyn and Sultana, Feinstein published a letter along with Driscoll and Winter alleging that "one side" had not responded to their mediation efforts some weeks prior.

Following Keir Starmer's resignation from Parliament on 1 September 2026, there was speculation that Feinstein would stand in the resulting by-election. However, Feinstein confirmed on 3 September that he did not intend to contest the election, stating that he was "not in a position to stand this time round". He later endorsed Zack Polanski's candidacy.

== The Shadow World ==
In 2011 Feinstein's book The Shadow World: Inside the Global Arms Trade, an investigation into the global arms industry was published outside the US by Penguin in 2011 and 2012 and in the United States by Farrar, Straus and Giroux. The Washington Post described the book as "A comprehensive treatment of the arms trade, possibly the most complete account ever written." Paul Rogers in The Independent commented: "one thing that has been missing has been a comprehensive book for the more general reader, along the lines of Anthony Sampson's The Arms Bazaar, back in the late 1970s. Andrew Feinstein's The Shadow World does just this, and in some ways it is even better than Sampson's influential volume. What is particularly useful is the very unusual combination of a thoroughly readable book that also provides a quite extraordinary range of sources – some 2,500 footnotes in all." Feinstein reported "that the trade in weapons accounts for around 40 percent of all corruption in all world trade. The...trade in weapons is extremely closely tied into the mechanics of government. The defence manufacturers, those who make the weapons, are closely tied in to governments, to militaries, to intelligence agencies and crucially to political parties."

The book was made into a feature documentary, Shadow World, by Louverture Films, directed by the Belgian Johan Grimonprez. Feinstein co-wrote the film and features in it. The film premiered at the Tribeca Film Festival in 2016 and won Best Documentary Feature Film at the Edinburgh International Film Festival in 2016, Tiempo de Historia Award (Best Documentary) Semana Internacional de Cine de Valladolid 2016, and Ensor Best Documentary at the Ostend Film Festival 2017. It was screened at the Wales One World Film Festival in March 2017.

== Views ==
Feinstein has characterised himself on X as a "proud leftie Jew".

Feinstein is a critic of the global arms trade and its regulation. In a 2012 interview with Democracy Now!, he noted the ways in which the global arms trade was linked to the Sandy Hook Elementary School shooting.

On the occasion of l'affaire Dadak in 2018, which concerned the activities of a Franco-Polish arm dealer Pierre Dadak, Feinstein commented: "Dadak's story reflects the complete amoral nature of the arms trade. The distinction between arms dealers and grifters is extremely fuzzy. A lot of these people are almost caricatures, they have huge personalities, they're delusional. The extraordinary thing is how company after company, government after government, actually fall for these people. And the reason they do it is because everything that happens in this trade is secret, so it provides absolutely fertile ground for these sorts of conmen".

Feinstein has argued for deploying the Boycott, Divestment and Sanctions strategy that helped end South Africa's crime of apartheid against the Israeli apartheid.

In a 2020 interview, Feinstein outlined a programme of gradually replacing representative democracy with a form of direct democracy based on online citizens' assemblies. He proposed making all political donations public and introducing a cap on individual contributions, obligating politicians to consult constituents more often, substituting professional politicians with short-term representatives drawn from other careers, and media regulation favouring the independent media.

During his 2024 UK general election campaign, Feinstein called for moving skilled workers from the arms industry into the renewable energy sector and expressed reservations about introducing a congestion charge for electric vehicles.

Feinstein has praised the organising strategy of the Workers' Party of Belgium, which he said developed "from a little grouping – some might even say a cult" by cultivating community presence and local investment. He has argued that Your Party should take the form of a national congress of independent local community associations.

== Personal life ==
Feinstein met his future wife Simone Sultana – whom he described as "highly politicised" – while at university in Cambridge. Four years after they first met, on 18 December 1993, they were married in King's College Chapel, Cambridge (Note: This was the "first-ever ceremony in the 700-year history of King's College Chapel in which neither bride nor groom was Anglican." (Feinstein 2007, pp. 7–8; Feinstein 2009, pp. 7–8)) holding further celebrations a few days later with Simone's family in Bangladesh. The couple, who live in Primrose Hill, have a son and a daughter. He supports the football club Arsenal.

== See also ==
- List of peace activists

== Books ==
- After the Party:
  - Feinstein, Andrew (2007). After the Party: A Personal and Political Journey Inside the ANC. Johannesburg & Cape Town: Jonathan Ball. ISBN 978-1-86842-262-3.
    – People with impaired vision might prefer this edition, as it is printed in a larger font than the 2009 edition.
  - Feinstein, Andrew (2009). After the Party: Corruption, the ANC and South Africa's Uncertain Future. London; New York: Verso. ISBN 978-1-84467-356-8.
    – with additional preface and afterword
- Feinstein, Andrew (2012). The Shadow World: Inside the Global Arms Trade. London: Penguin Books. ISBN 978-0-141-04005-9.
- Michie, Rhona; Feinstein, Andrew; Rogers, Paul, eds. (2024). Monstrous Anger of the Guns: How the Arms Trade Is Ruining the World and What We Can Do About It. Preface by Jeremy Corbyn. London: Pluto Press; Peace & Justice Project. ISBN 978-0-7453-5036-3.

== Notes and references ==
=== Videos ===
- Feinstein, Andrew (29 October 2020). "I Lost 39 Members of My Family in the Holocaust, Jeremy Corbyn is No Antisemite". Double Down News – via YouTube. (7:49 minutes)
- Feinstein, Andrew (26 December 2020). "Andrew Feinstein on Keir Starmer, the Weaponisation of Antisemitism & Purging the Left from Labour" (Interview). Interviewed by Shlomo Anker. The Rose Report – via YouTube. (11:55 minutes)
- Feinstein, Andrew (5 June 2024). "The anti-apartheid activist who could stop the UK's likely next PM". Unapologetic (Interview). Interviewed by Roger Waters. Middle East Eye – via YouTube. (1 hour 50 minutes)
- Feinstein, Andrew (5 July 2024). "Not the General Election 2024" (Interview). Interviewed by Crispin Flintoff – via YouTube. (9:30 minutes; part of a 7hr 22min 38sec video)

=== Sources (excluding videos) ===
- "Andrew Feinstein — Who's Who SA". Archived from the original on 23 June 2012.
- "The arms deal: what you need to know". Corruption Watch. 22 January 2014.
- "As U.S. Faces Gun Epidemic Post-Newtown, Obama Urged to Break With NRA & Back Global U.N. Arms Treaty". Democracy Now!. 26 December 2012.
- Belford, Aubrey; Cieśla, Wojciech; Gesina-Torres, Endy; Sarcevic, Lejla (24 February 2018). "How a French Fraudster Climbed the World of International Arms Dealing". Organized Crime and Corruption Reporting Unit.
- Bennett, Ronan; et al. (3 December 2019). "Vote for hope and a decent future". Letters. The Guardian.
- "Candidates". Candidates.
- Carter, Fin (4 July 2024). "The left-winger trying to take Starmer's seat". Prospect.
- Chambers, Dave (29 March 2019). "Activists urge UCT to support academic boycott of Israeli universities". TimesLIVE.
- "Declassified UK". Daily Maverick. 4 March 2020.
- Feinstein, Andrew (19 January 2013). "Is society inherently corrupt? A look at the global arms industry and the effect corruption has on our politics, society and culture". South to North (Interview). Interviewed by Redi Tlhabi. Al Jazeera.
- Feinstein, Andrew [@andrewfeinstein] (26 November 2019). "I am Jewish, the son of a Holocaust survivor who lost dozens of her family in the camps. I was the 1st MP to introduce a motion on the Holocaust in the SA Parliament. I've lectured at Auschwitz on genocide prevention. I unequivocally support Jeremy Corbyn & want him as the next PM" (Tweet) – via Twitter.
- Feinstein, Andrew (10 August 2020). "Representative Democracy: An Interview with Andrew Feinstein". The Kamugasa Challenge (Interview). Interviewed by Kamugasa, Stephen. Archived from the original on 26 August 2025.
- Feinstein, Andrew (5 July 2023). "Sanctions Mark II". New Internationalist.
- Hearst, Katherine (12 February 2024). "UK: Anti-apartheid campaigner Andrew Feinstein set to challenge Starmer in upcoming elections". Middle East Eye.
- Mair, Alex (3 July 2024). "An Independent, Pro-Gaza Candidate Claims he can Block Keir Starmer's Election this Thursday". Byline Times.
- Mulla, Imran (5 July 2024). "Keir Starmer wins reelection in Holborn and St Pancras but vote share slashed". Middle East Eye.
- Proctor, Kate (3 December 2019). "Coogan and Klein lead cultural figures backing Corbyn and Labour". The Guardian.
- Rogers, Paul (18 November 2011). "The Shadow World: Inside the Global Arms Trade by Andrew Feinstein". The Independent. Archived from the original on 20 November 2011.
- "Shadow World". Louverture Films.
- "Shadow World Investigations Ltd: Company number 07087435". Companies House.
- Shadow World: Press Kit (PDF), Shadow World Productions, 2016, archived (PDF) from the original on 20 September 2020
- Snow, Jon (29 October 2020). "'I have never seen any evidence of racism, of antisemitism or anything closely related to' – Jewish Labour member Andrew Feinstein on Corbyn". Channel 4 News.
- Tirman, John (4 November 2011). "The Shadow World: Inside the Global Arms Trade by Andrew Feinstein". The Washington Post.
- "WOW Wales One World Film Festival". Culture Colony (in Welsh). 17 March 2017.
