= Secondary modern school =

Type of secondary school in the UK

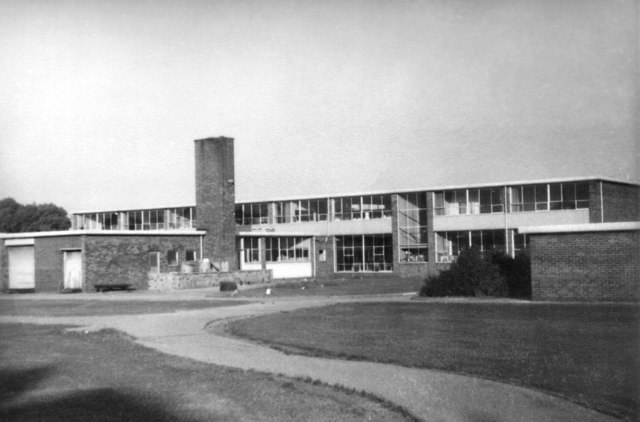
Great Stone Road Secondary Modern in Trafford, Greater Manchester, c. 1969

A secondary modern school (Welsh: ysgol uwchradd fodern) was a type of secondary school that existed throughout England, Wales and Northern Ireland from 1944 until the 1970s under the Tripartite System. Secondary modern schools accommodated the majority (70–75%) of pupils between 11 and 15. Those who achieved the highest scores in the 11-plus were allowed to go to a selective grammar school which offered education beyond 15. From 1965 onwards (following Circular 10/65), secondary moderns were replaced in most of the UK by the comprehensive school system.

Schools of this type continue in Northern Ireland, where they are usually referred to as secondary schools, and in areas of England, such as Buckinghamshire (where they are referred to as upper/all-ability schools), Lincolnshire (still called secondary modern) and Wirral (called all-ability schools), and Kent where they are referred to as non-selective.

== Origins ==
The tripartite system of streaming children of presumed different intellectual ability into different secondary schools has its origin in the interwar period influenced by the recommendations of the Hadow report of 1926. Three levels of secondary school emerged in England and Wales: academic grammar schools (some with the new name county school) for the top tier of pupils deemed likely to study at university or enter a profession; central schools which provided artisan and trade training, as well as domestic skills for girls; and some other secondary schools which provided a basic secondary education. Prior to 1944 however the majority (80%) attended only elementary school prior to leaving at 14.

As recommended by the Spens Report of 1938 and Norwood Report of 1943, educational practice in the 1940s developed this system so that children were tested and streamed into the renamed grammar, technical and secondary modern schools at the age of eleven. In practice, few technical schools were created, and most technical and central schools, such as Frank Montgomery School in Kent, became secondary modern schools. As a result, the tripartite system was in effect a bipartite system in which children who passed the eleven-plus examination were sent to grammar schools and those who failed the test went to secondary modern schools.

It was envisaged that the secondary modern would 'provide a series of courses for children of widely differing ability, aptitude and social background. It has to cater for the needs of intelligent boys and girls, for those with a marked practical bent, as well as for the special problem of the backward children'. At a secondary modern school there was a core curriculum of 'English (or English and Welsh), mathematics, history, geography and science. In addition pupils might receive training in a wide range of practical skills. 'Rural science, auto-engineering, pre-apprenticeship, practical crafts, and electrical science' were mentioned in a 1956 parliamentary debate.

There was a focus on training in basic subjects, such as arithmetic, mechanical skills such as woodworking and domestic skills, such as cookery. In an age before the advent of the National Curriculum, the specific subjects taught were chosen by the individual schools, but the curriculum at the Frank Montgomery School in Kent (at its opening in 1935 as a central school) was stated as including "practical education, such as cookery, laundry, gardening, woodwork, metalwork and practical geography".

The first secondary moderns were created by converting about 1,200 elementary schools, as well as central schools, which previously had offered a continuation of primary education to the age of 14, into separate institutions. Many more were built between the end of World War II and 1965, in an effort to provide universal secondary education. In 1956 there were 3,500 such schools.

Prior to the provision of the Education Act 1944 the school leaving age was 14. The secondary modern schools therefore had to accommodate, after implementation in 1947, a new cohort of 14–15-year-old pupils. It is suggested that this was a demotivated rump of 14–15-year-olds who did not want to be there. The subsequent raising of statutory school leaving age to 16 was in 1972. This 1972 change, as with the 1947 change, impacted the secondary moderns more than other secondary schools as more pupils previously left at the earliest legal age.

== Tripartite system ==
The eleven-plus exam was employed to stream children into grammar schools, technical schools (which were very few and were established only in some regions) and secondary modern schools. Claims that the 11-plus was biased in favour of middle-class children remain controversial. However, strong evidence exists that the outcome of streaming was that, overwhelmingly, grammar schools were attended by middle-class children while secondary modern schools were attended by working-class children.

The most academically able of students in secondary modern schools found that a potential progression to advanced post-secondary studies or higher education was constrained by limitations within their schools, the wider educational system and access to higher external examinations.

The 'baby boomer' generation was particularly affected during the period 1957 to 1970 because grammar-school places had not been sufficiently increased to accommodate the large bulge in student numbers which entered secondary schools during this period. As a result, cut-off standards on the 11-plus for entry into grammar schools rose and many students who would, in earlier years, have been streamed into grammar schools were instead sent to secondary modern schools.

Although parity of esteem between this and the other sections of the tripartite system had been planned, in practice the secondary modern came to be seen as the school for failures. Those who had "failed" their 11-plus were sent there to learn rudimentary skills before advancing to factory or menial jobs. After its introduction in 1965, secondary moderns prepared students for the CSE examination, rather than the more prestigious O Level, and although sporadic teaching for the latter was established in some schools, fewer than one in ten students participated. As schools for 11–15 or later 11–16 year olds, secondary moderns did not prepare pupils for the Higher School Certificate or GCE A Level (after 1951), both normally taken at 18.

Grammar schools were generally funded at a higher per-student level than secondary modern schools. Secondary moderns were generally deprived of both resources and good teachers. The Newsom Report of 1963 reported on education for these children, and found that in some schools in slum areas of London 15-year-old pupils were sitting on furniture intended for primary schools. Staff turnover was high and continuity in teaching minimal. Not all secondary moderns were as bad, but they did generally suffer from neglect by authorities.

The interaction of the outcome of 11-plus streaming (middle class into grammar schools and working class into secondary modern schools) and better funding of grammar schools produced the result that middle-class children experienced better resourced schools offering superior future educational and vocational options, while working-class children experienced comparatively inferior schools offering more limited prospects for educational and vocational progress. This reinforced class divisions in subsequent vocational achievement and earning potential.

=== Criticisms ===
Although most students sent to secondary modern schools experienced the negative consequences of lower per-student funding than that enjoyed by grammar-school students, there existed a segment of the population of students in secondary modern schools that was particularly disadvantaged in the extent to which their schools could equip them to reach their full educational potential. This group consisted of the most academically able of students within the secondary modern system. The capacity of secondary modern schools to offer the best possible education to these students was limited by several factors:

- Secondary modern schools were less disposed than grammar schools to promote school cultures favouring academic achievement. In their original conception secondary modern schools 'were to be shielded from the stultifying effects of external examinations' with students having no access to GCE O Levels or other external examinations. Even though, during the 1950s, some secondary modern schools started to prepare their higher level students for GCE O Levels, the schools retained cultures which were more relaxed with respect to academic achievement than those fostered by grammar schools.
- Secondary modern schools were far less inclined than grammar schools to encourage aspirations of student progression to advanced post-secondary and university education. While some secondary modern schools hoped that a proportion of students in their top classes might obtain reasonable results in GCE O Levels, there was rarely, if ever, a notion that a student might progress to A Levels. Further, for a student to profess a desire to undertake university studies would have been considered unrealistic and pretentious.
- Secondary modern schools provided limited access to GCE O Levels and no access to GCE A Levels.
- Inadequate provision was made for secondary modern students who performed well in GCE O Levels to articulate their studies to A Levels. During the 1950s and early 1960s, grammar schools would commonly not accept entry by secondary modern students who had done well in O Levels and who wished to study for A Levels. Such students had to leave the school system and enrol at post-secondary institutions (generally for part-time, evening study). Accordingly, once a student had been streamed into a secondary modern school, irrespective of the student's level of success in GCE O Levels, the student faced enormous challenges in attempting to progress to GCE A Levels and beyond to university. There is limited information available as to why the Tripartite System showed inflexibility in this respect. There is also limited information as to how many secondary modern students, who performed well in GCE O Levels, were subsequently frustrated in attempting to progress to A Levels and beyond.

Ex-pupils have commented on the experience of being an academically able pupil in a secondary modern school and damage to self-esteem. Michael Paraskos, who attended a secondary modern in Kent, claimed 'You knew you were a failure from day one. Because they told you! So they weren't pleasant places to be if you were into art, or books, or anything like that'. Paraskos also claimed in The Guardian that those who attend secondary modern schools 'are condemned to a lifetime of social exclusion and crippling self-doubt.'

According to Anthony Sampson, in his book Anatomy of Britain (1965), there were structural problems within the testing process that underpinned the eleven plus which meant it tended to result in secondary modern schools being overwhelmingly dominated by the children of poor and working-class parents, while grammar schools were dominated by the children of wealthier middle-class parents.

In the 1960s there was increasing criticism of the limitations imposed on students within secondary modern schools flowing from political pressure from increasing numbers of middle-class parents of 'baby boomer' children who did not obtain admission to grammar schools. and evidence that students from secondary modern schools who took GCE O Levels were increasingly achieving results comparable to those being achieved by students from grammar schools (a remarkable finding given the disadvantages, discussed above, of secondary modern schools compared to grammar schools)

== Movement towards a comprehensive system ==
The failure of secondary modern schools generally to equip the 'submerged three quarters' of British schoolchildren to realise their full potential led to calls for reform. Experiments with comprehensive schools began in the 1950s, hoping to provide an education that would offer greater opportunities for those who did not enter grammar schools. In the 1950's a few LEA's (local education authorities), such as Leicestershire, eliminated their secondary moderns as part of an early comprehensivisation. In 1965, the Labour government issued Circular 10/65, effectively a central government mandate to the LEA's for the introduction of comprehensive education. By 1976, with the exception of areas which held out against 10/65, such as Bournemouth, Buckinghamshire, Kent, Lincolnshire, Stoke, Ripon, Slough, Torquay, the Wirral and Warwickshire (part), secondary modern schools had been formally phased out in the UK, except Northern Ireland.

== Secondary modern schools today ==
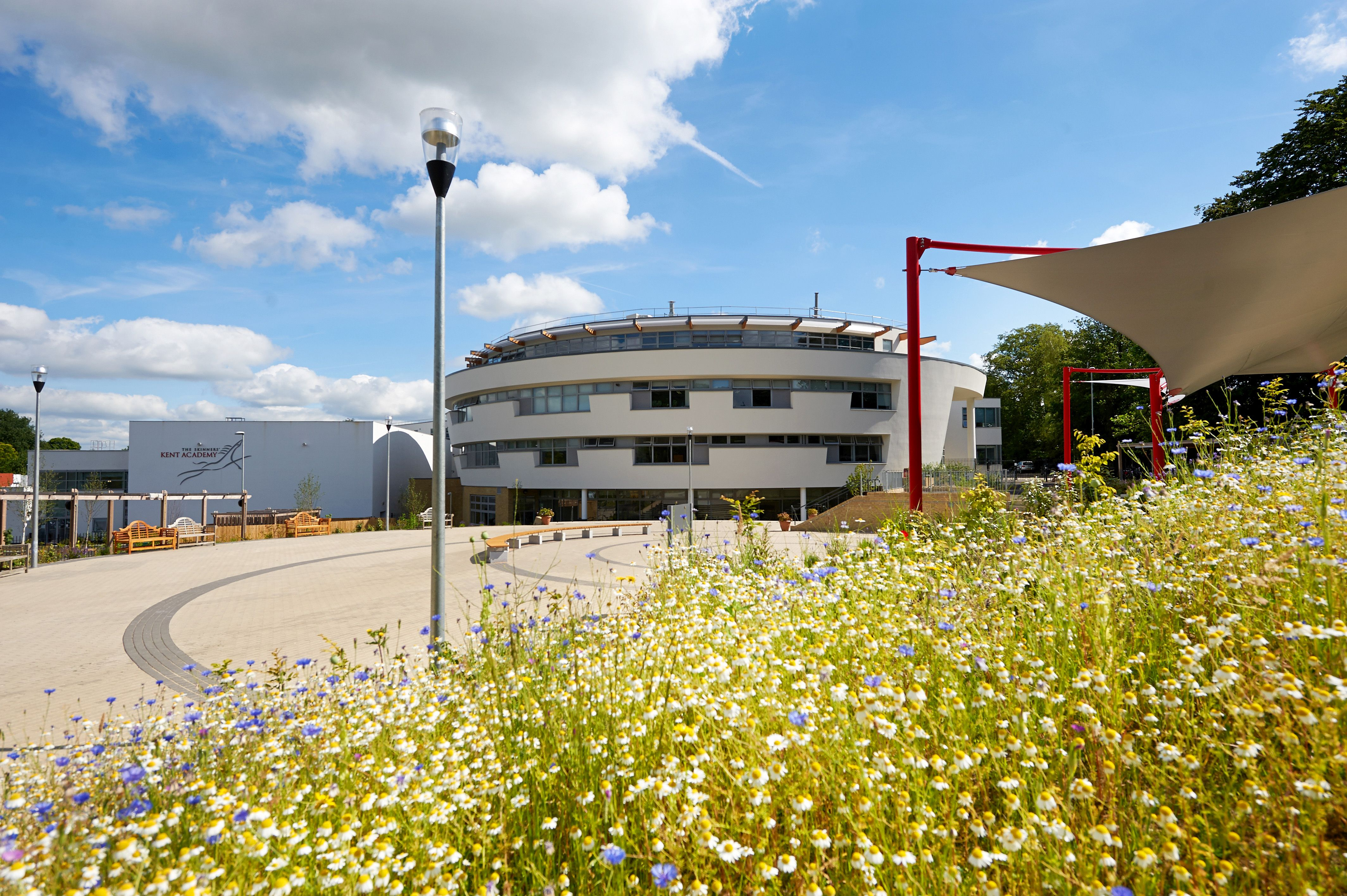
The Skinners' Kent Academy is a non-selective secondary school in Royal Tunbridge Wells, Kent with academy status.

In areas still operating a selective system, it is estimated that there are circa 450 secondary schools taking pupils not selected to attend one of the UK's remaining 163 grammar schools. These schools may be known as high schools (Trafford), upper schools (Buckinghamshire), all-ability or non-selective schools.

The term secondary modern has completely disappeared in the naming of schools, although in 2013 the National Association of Secondary Moderns was founded by Ian Widdows, former Headteacher at the Giles Academy in Boston, Lincolnshire. The organisation represents non-selective schools in selective areas and has organised a number of national conferences since it was founded, such as one in April 2016 addressed by Shadow Secretary of State for Education Lucy Powell, Tim Leunig from the Department for Education, and National Schools Commissioner Sir David Carter, among others.

Ofsted continues to judge secondary moderns in the same way it judges grammar schools, expecting them to show the same academic achievement as schools that have not had the top ability quartile removed. Ofsted admits it does not have a record of the number of secondary moderns and that its inspectors have received no training on how to assess them. They are prevented from awarding the highest grades to a school as that would require the data to take into account the differing intakes.

In 2016, the Government introduced Progress 8 as a headline method to judge secondary schools, in which the sum of all the pupils' GCSE achievements was compared with the predicted grades, in order to expose "coasting" schools. Each grade achieved was worth one point. In 2017 for one year, they modified the method so a low grade was worth 0.5 and the top grades received 1.5, thus weighting the benchmark towards the most able. This disproportionately affected schools only serving the three less-able quartiles. Frank Norris, director of the Co-operative Academies Trust that runs eight academies, believes the changes will advantage high-achievers. "The proposed changes are based on the flawed thinking that it is much harder for a student to move from a grade B to an A rather than from grade G to F," he said. "They are probably discriminatory because they imply it is less important and worthwhile for lower-attaining students to achieve as well as they can."

== See also ==
- Tripartite System
- Grammar schools debate
- Education in England
- Education in Northern Ireland
- Education in Wales
