= After the Party =

After the Party may refer to:

== Books ==
- After The Party, novel by Lisa Jewell 2010
- After the Party, 2007 book by Andrew Feinstein about the South African Arms Deal

== Music ==
- After The Party, album by Paul Oxley's Unit 1983
- After The Party, album by The Push Stars 1999
- After The Party, album by Caleb Sean 2010
- After the Party (album), by The Menzingers 2017
- "After the Party", song from How to Stuff a Wild Bikini 1965
- "After the Party", song by John Schumann from Etched in Blue 1987
- "After the Party", song by Bishi from Nights at the Circus (album) 2007

== Other uses ==
- After the Party (BoJack Horseman), a 2015 episode
- After the Party (TV series), a 2023 New Zealand TV series starring Robyn Malcolm
