= Montgomery County Sentinel =

Newspaper in Montgomery County, Maryland

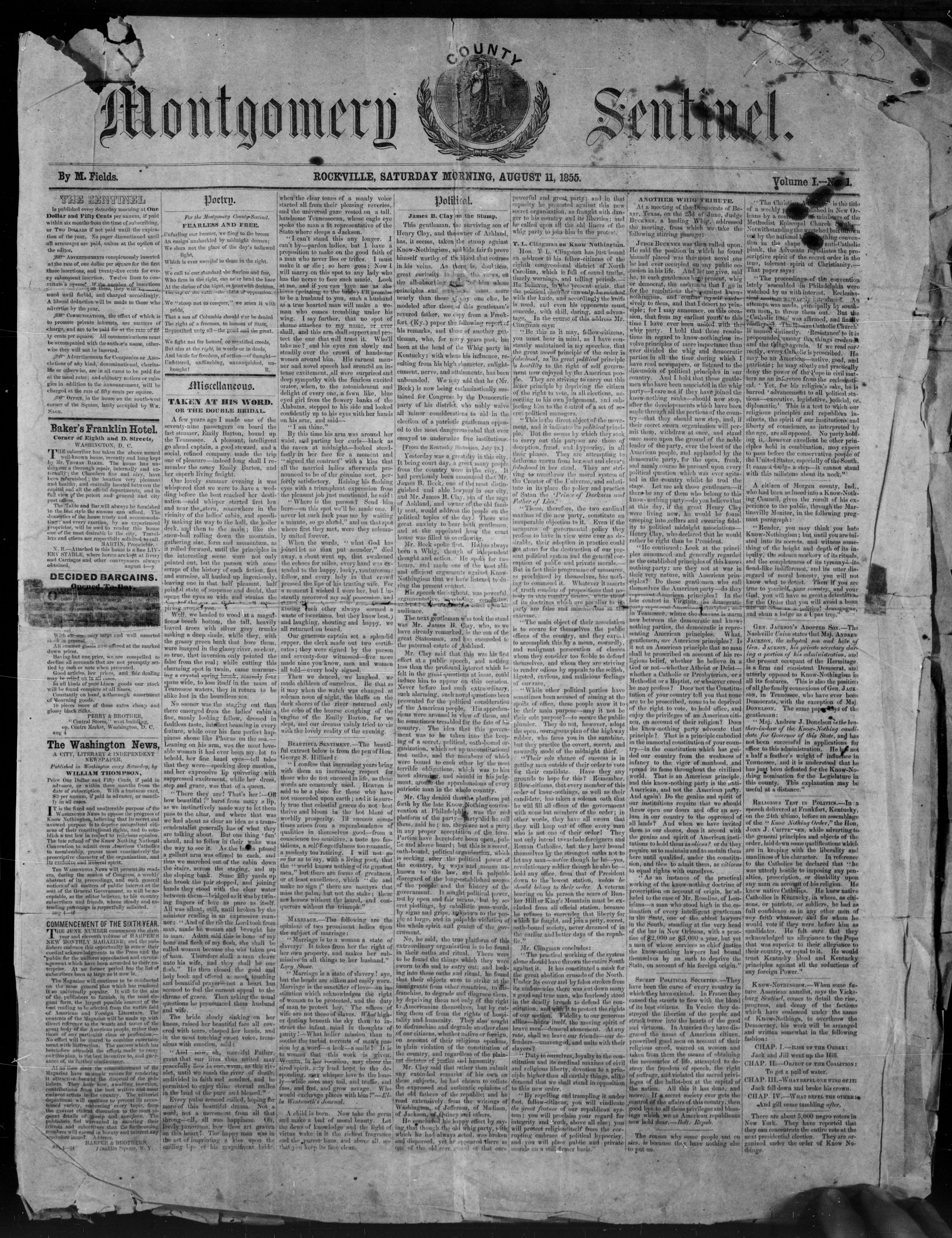
- The cover page of the August 11, 1855 inaugural issue of The Montgomery County Sentinel
- Type: Weekly newspaper
- Format: Compact
- Owner(s): Berlyn, Inc.
- Founder: Matthew Fields
- Publisher: Lynn G. Kapiloff
- Editor: Daniel J. Kucin, Jr.
- Metro editor: José Mauricio Umaña
- Founded: August 11, 1855; 170 years ago
- Ceased publication: January 30, 2020
- Language: English
- Headquarters: 22 West Jefferson Street, Rockville, Maryland, 20850
- Country: United States
- Sister newspapers: Prince George's Sentinel
- OCLC number: 9627507
- Website: mont.thesentinel.com

The Montgomery County Sentinel was a newspaper that operated from 1855 to 2020 in Rockville in Montgomery County, Maryland. It was long one of the smallest local newspapers by circulation and was at its closing the oldest continuously published newspaper.

== History ==
The Montgomery County Sentinel was first published as a weekly newspaper on August 11, 1855, by Matthew Fields in Rockville, Maryland.

The early focus of the paper was on advertising and politics, with relatively little space devoted to local news. News articles were usually brief and to the point without elaboration. On two occasions, once before and once during the Civil War, the paper suffered brief interruptions while Union military forces detained Matthew Fields, a Southern sympathizer.

Throughout the war, the Sentinel wrote on the issue of slavery and when Abraham Lincoln issued the Emancipation Proclamation, Fields published the document's text in full on September 26, 1862. The editors of the Sentinel took a firm stance against the Emancipation Act believing that it encouraged the occurrence of a racial war. In addition to discussing the various political issues, war reports also informed readers on the progress of the war.

After rioting killed Union soldiers in Baltimore, the institution of martial law in Maryland allowed the Union Army to imprison Confederate sympathizers for disloyalty. On October 6, 1862, Union soldiers arrested Matthew Fields on the suspicion of 'southern sympathies.' Court documents indicate Fields was to be released as soon as he was willing to take an oath not to publish material favoring the South. He was released on November 25, 1862, during Lincoln's Thanksgiving Amnesty.

Fields was later arrested by United States military authorities once again, in the spring of 1864. He would be released in the following June. The paper ceased publication during this time period.

Fields died in 1871 and his wife Rebecca took over publication, often handling production entirely on her own until 1910 when Matthew Fields' son Henry Clay Fields became the editor. Rebecca Fields maintained a limited role until her death in 1930 at age 100.

The Fields family maintained ownership of the Sentinel until 1932, when they sold the newspaper to Paul Griffith Stromberg. Stromberg expanded the newspaper, hired numerous reporters, and added a newsboy to handle deliveries. Much of the coverage during his ownership concerned roads for moving products from the mills. It also covered the death of his son and the use of German prisoners-of-war to help on farms in Gaithersburg.

In its centennial year of 1955, the Stromberg family sold the Sentinel to Louis Linebach and Cy Campbell. Linebach and Campbell often disagreed, and Campbell eventually sold his stake in the publication. One of the key events during their ownership was the Supreme Court ruling in Brown v. Board of Education.

In 1962, Leonard and Bernard Kapiloff purchased the newspaper from Linebach. During the 1960s, the Sentinel’s reporting on "The Giles Case," often referred to as the "'To Kill a Mockingbird' case of Montgomery County," led to freeing African Americans charged and wrongly convicted of rape.

After failing a two-week trial hiring at The Washington Post in 1970, Bob Woodward spent a year at the Sentinel as a reporter. The Post rehired Woodward and within 12 months he worked with Carl Bernstein to investigate the Watergate break-in.

In June 2015, the Sentinel removed more than 80 editorial cartoons it had plagiarized from other artists.

On January 30, 2020, the Sentinel ceased publication.

== Contributors ==
Writers, political activists, and editors who worked at the Sentinel include:

- Bob Woodward
- Rob Redding
- Danica Roem
- Knight Kiplinger
- Tom Shales
- Robert Pear
