= Our Lady College, Antwerp =

Our Lady College
- Dutch: Onze-Lieve-Vrouwecollege

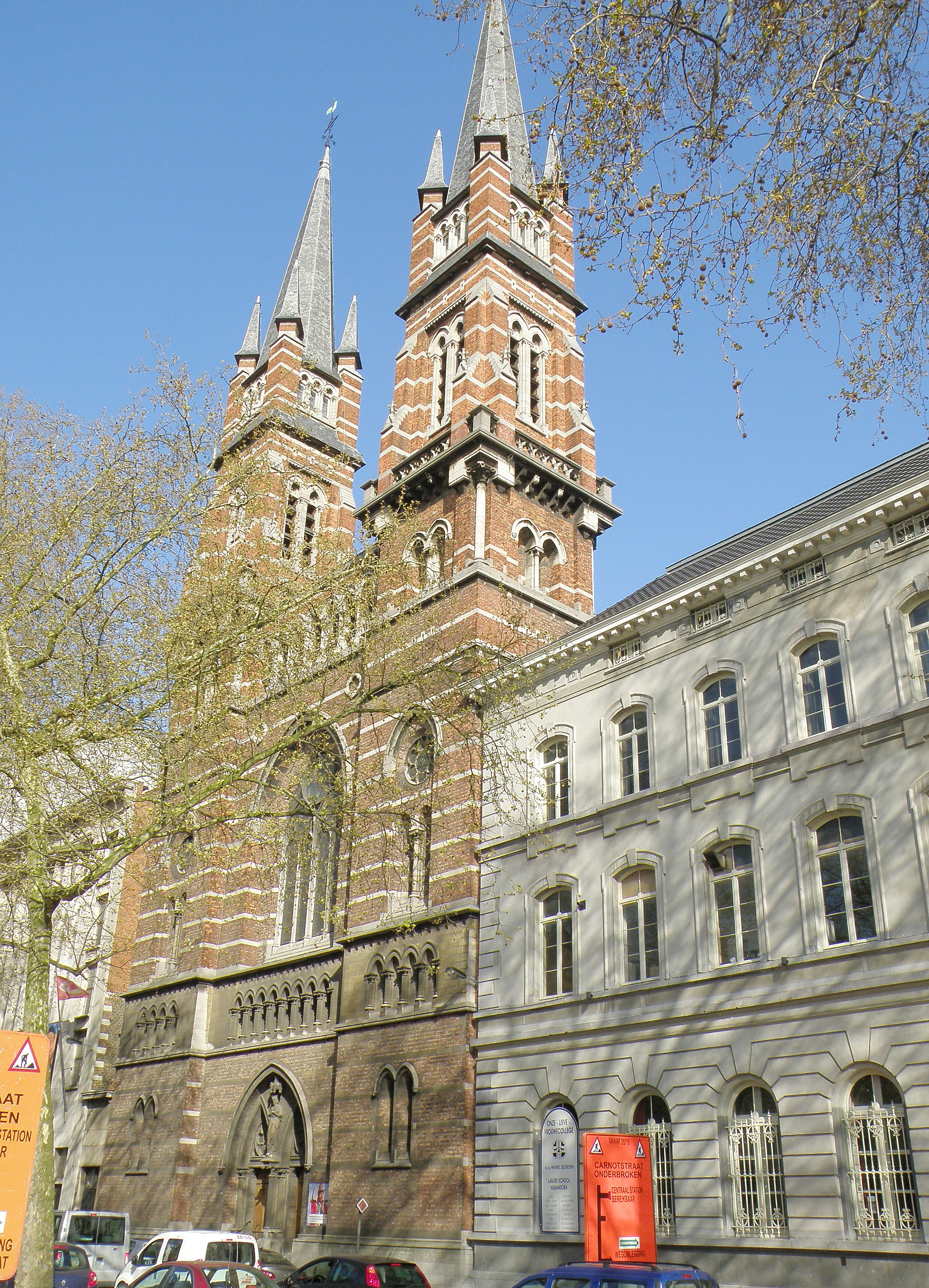
- College building to right of church

Location
- Antwerp; Belgium
- Coordinates: 51°12′49″N 4°24′45″E

Information
- Type: Private primary and secondary school
- Religious affiliation: Catholicism
- Denomination: Jesuits
- Established: 1575; 451 years ago
- Status: Open
- Closed: 1576-1585; 1773-1840
- Website: olvc.telenet.be

Our Lady College (Dutch: Onze-Lieve-Vrouwecollege) is a private Catholic primary and secondary school in Antwerp, Belgium. The school was founded by the Society of Jesus in 1575 and the school building was designed by Jules Bilmeyer, completed in 1875.

== History ==
In 1575, the Jesuits opened their first school in the city in a building that became part of the Lessius Hogeschool. After war with Spain in 1576, the Jesuits had to leave the city, but returned in 1585 and reopened the school.

In 1607 and again in 1655, the school had to move to larger premises to keep up with the expanding population.

In 1773, Pope Clement XIV ordered for all Jesuit educational services to cease. The Jesuits did not return to Antwerp until 1840, when they reopened the college. It was situated in what is now a restaurant for students of the University of Antwerp.

In 1871, the capacity of the school again needed to be increased so land was bought in a series of streets in the centre of Antwerp called 'the Avenues'. There, they got the architect Jules Bilmeyer to design the new school. It was completed in 1875. Twelve years later, he also completed the building of the church next door to the school, Our Lady of Grace Church (Dutch: Onze-Lieve-Vrouw van Gratie Kerk).

== Notable alumni ==
- Tom Barman
- Luc Bertrand
- Christian de Duve
- Gabriel Fehervari
- Jef Geeraerts
- Count Albert Le Grelle
- Mgr Stanislas Le Grelle
- Count Bernard Le Grelle
- Jan Leyers
- Daniel Cardon de Lichtbuer

== Gallery ==
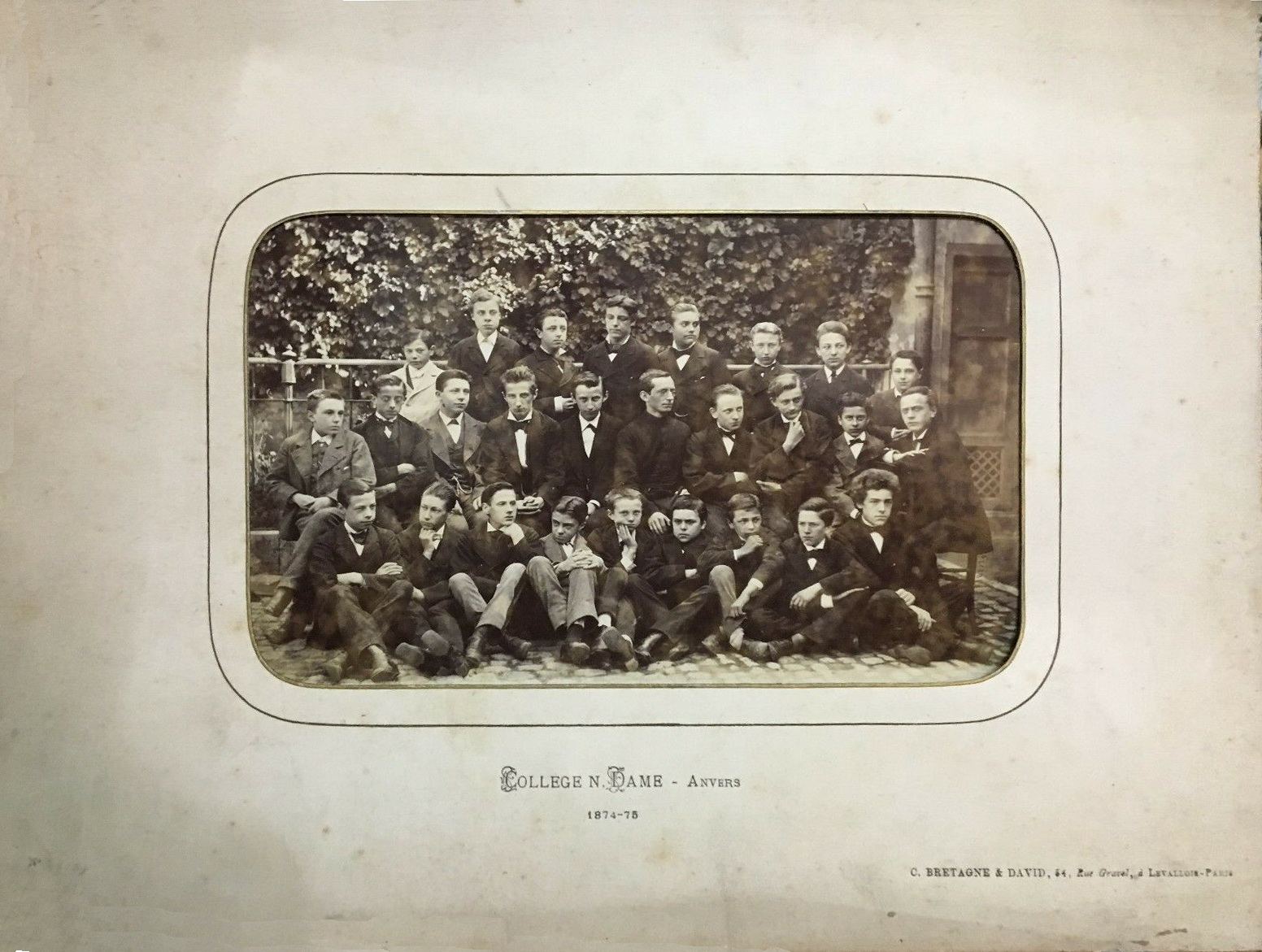
Class of 1874/75 photographed by Claude Bretagne & Jules David

== See also ==
- Education in Belgium
- Roman Catholicism in Belgium
- List of Jesuit schools
