= The Money Lenders =

1981 book by Anthony Sampson

- Title page for The Money Lenders: Bankers and a World in Turmoil (1982)
- Author: Anthony Sampson
- Language: English
- Subject: Finance
- Genre: Non-fiction
- Publication date: 1981
- Publication place: United Kingdom

The Money Lenders: Bankers and a World in Turmoil is a 1981 book on finance by British journalist Anthony Sampson. It looks at the history of banking from the Renaissance to a meeting of the International Monetary Fund in Washington, D.C. in 1980, with an emphasis on the interaction of finance and international diplomacy.

The bank discusses the formative years of three Wall Street giants: The Chase Manhattan, Citibank and the Bank of America. The book then discusses the creation of the Federal Reserve system in 1913, the Wall Street crash of 1929 and the successive years of the Great Depression.

The book was largely inspired by the work of the Brandt Commission on "North–South relations." Mr. Sampson served as editorial advisor to the chairman, Willy Brandt, on that commission.

The Money Lenders begins with a vivid description of the scene in the lobby of the Sheraton Washington Hotel during that 1980 IMF meeting, which Sampson labels "the most superior of all salesmen's conventions."
