= Anatomy of Britain =

1962 book by Anthony Sampson

- Title page for Anatomy of Britain (1962)
- Author: Anthony Sampson
- Language: English
- Genre: Non-fiction
- Publisher: Hodder & Stoughton
- Publication date: 1962
- Publication place: United Kingdom

Anatomy of Britain was a book written by Anthony Sampson and published by Hodder & Stoughton in 1962. The book is an examination of the purported ruling classes of the United Kingdom, looking at the holders of political, bureaucratic, and financial power. He completely rewrote the book over four decades, thus enabling changes in power structures to be considered over time. Sampson died in 2004, shortly after Who Runs This Place? was published. The published versions were:

1. Anatomy of Britain (1962) online free
2. Anatomy of Britain today (1965)
3. The New Anatomy of Britain (1971) online free
4. Changing Anatomy of Britain (1982)
5. The Essential Anatomy of Britain: Democracy in Crisis (1992) online free
6. Who Runs This Place? The Anatomy of Britain in the 21st Century (2004)
