= The Sovereign State =

The Sovereign State The Secret History of International Telephone and Telegraph
- Hardcover edition
- Author: Anthony Sampson
- Language: English
- Subject: ITT Corporation
- Genre: Non-fiction
- Publisher: Hodder & Stoughton Ltd.
- Publication date: July 1, 1973
- Publication place: United States
- Media type: Print
- Pages: 256 pp.
- ISBN: 0-340-17195-2

The Sovereign State: The Secret History of International Telephone and Telegraph is a non-fiction book by Anthony Sampson published on July 1, 1973, by Hodder & Stoughton Ltd. The book focuses on the history of ITT Corporation to make a broader point about the weakening of the authority of traditional national governments by the multinational corporations.

In some editions it was sold under the title of The Sovereign State of ITT.

== Plot ==
In part, it was a portrait of Harold Geneen, the chief executive of ITT from 1959 until 1977. Geneen was a legendarily hands-on manager, who believed it necessary to penetrate through layers of "false facts" to get to the "unshakable facts" about any of the markets or divisions of his conglomerate. In terms of its broader themes, though, this book was one of a spate of early-70s books that promoted the thesis that multinational corporations were taking over the traditional prerogatives and functions of national governments.

In a review of Sampson's book in the Sunday Telegraph, Sir Frank McFadzean, Vice Chairman of Royal Dutch/Shell, took issue with that thesis. Such corporations are "prisoners of their past investments," he wrote, because "even the most puny government can nationalize, and the only redress is to seek compensation."

Although as Sampson's book shows ITT has used other means of redress to defend its own business interests from nationalisation, that have not been confined to the courts. These have ranged from supporting the 1930s military takeover by General Franco in Spain, investing in Hitler's war machine throughout World War II, and funding a CIA-backed coup led by General Pinochet in Chile 1973.

== Official information ==
- Sampson, Anthony (1973). The Sovereign State: The Secret History of ITT. London: Hodder and Stoughton. ISBN 0-340-17195-2.
- Stein and Day, US publisher (1973)
