= After the Party (book) =

2007 book by Andrew Feinstein

After the Party: A Personal and Political Journey Inside the ANC
- Author: Andrew Feinstein
- Language: English
- Subject: Thabo Mbeki; Corruption in South Africa; African National Congress; International Arms Trade; Politics of South Africa
- Genre: Non-fiction
- Published: Cape Town
- Publisher: Jonathan Ball; Verso
- Publication date: 23 October 2007
- Publication place: South Africa
- Pages: 300
- ISBN: 978-1868422623 (Paperback)

After the Party: A Personal and Political Journey Inside the ANC is a 2007 book by Andrew Feinstein, a former African National Congress (ANC) politician and documentary film maker from South Africa about corruption within the ANC and South African government. It covers the period of President Thabo Mbeki's administration.

A new edition of the book was published in May 2009.

== Background and synopsis ==
The book details the rise of corruption within South Africa generally and the ANC in particular. Resulting in the weakening of state institutions and the rise of autocracy within the South African government. It is told from Feinstein's insider's point of view as a former ANC Minister of Parliament. The book deals with the South African Arms Deal, South African policy towards the situation within Zimbabwe, HIV/AIDS denialism within the Mbeki regime, the Jacob Zuma rape trial, and accounts of political infighting within the ruling ANC. Feinstein focuses on the Arms Deal as an example of how the ruling ANC's internal decline happened.

The book ends with recommendations to help resolve these issues ranging from codes of ethical conduct to improved standards of transparency. Feinstein predicts that the then upcoming presidency of President Jacob Zuma was unlikely to reduce levels of corruption within the ANC or South Africa.
