= The Arms Bazaar =

The Arms Bazaar: From Lebanon to Lockheed
- First edition cover
- Author: Anthony Sampson
- Language: English
- Subject: International arms trade
- Genre: Non-fiction
- Publisher: Viking Adult
- Publication date: July 11, 1977
- Publication place: United States
- Pages: 352 pp.
- ISBN: 978-0670132638

The Arms Bazaar: From Lebanon to Lockheed is an investigation and anatomical study of the international arms trade by Anthony Sampson (1926–2004).

== Overview ==
The book was published in 1977. Sampson describes how the "defence industry" grew uncontrollably.

Sampson explains how the system produces a "growing frenzy to push weapons into the new markets". He mentions the role of governments and the development of the arms salesman. He describes the private manufacture of arms.

The book begins by describing how the arms industry was changed by the industrial revolution and mass production, and the accomplishments of the Swedish born scientist Alfred Nobel and how he influenced the business through his invention of nitroglycerin and later on dynamite. While describing Nobel, the author also describes the Swedish defence contractors like Bofors which was owned by Nobel and Saab AB.

The book largely discusses the beginning of U.S arms export during the Cold War under the auspices of the then Secretary of Defense Robert McNamara to reverse the deficit in the balance of payment. It shows how actually The Pentagon helped the American defense contractors to make weapons sales to the NATO allies in Europe instead of providing them with direct security.

It examines what went wrong to the sale of Lockheed Martin F-104 Starfighter to West Germany and Netherlands. The Luftwaffe lost more than 300 Starfighters during training and operation. The sales of Northrop F-5 Tiger is also considered.

The book also explains how American companies used the connections of the Saudi arms dealer Adnan Khashoggi and used bribery to make a lucrative arms sales to the oil rich Saudi Arabia. Saudis during the time were booming with the oil money and were eager buyers of American weapons.

The book continues about CIA, Kermit Roosevelt, and arms sales to the Mohammad Reza Shah.
