= Spotlight on Corruption =

Spotlight on Corruption is a British nonprofit organization which focuses on financial corruption.

The previous organization Corruption Watch UK was established in 2009 by Susan Hawley, who was its policy director for ten years and is as of 2022 the executive director of Spotlight on Corruption. Corruption Watch UK also splintered off Shadow World Investigations.

The chair of Spotlight on Corruption's board is Elizabeth David-Barrett, professor of governance and integrity and director of the Centre for the Study of Corruption at the University of Sussex.
