= Robert Pear =

American journalist (1949–2019)

- Born: June 12, 1949; Washington, D.C., U.S.
- Died: May 7, 2019 (aged 69); Rockville, Maryland, U.S.
- Education: Harvard University; Balliol College, Oxford; Columbia University Graduate School of Journalism
- Occupation: Journalist
- Years active: 1974–2019

Robert Lawrence Pear (June 12, 1949 – May 7, 2019) was an American journalist based in Washington, D.C., who worked at The Washington Star from 1974 to 1979 before joining The New York Times in 1979, where he was employed until his death. He was best known for his health care policy reporting.

== Early life and education ==
Pear was born on June 12, 1949, to Philip and Marion Pear, in Washington, D.C. Forced by his father to read the front page of the newspaper before being allowed to read the sports section, he became interested in journalism after the assassination of John F. Kennedy.

Pear was a classmate of future Democratic senator Chuck Schumer at Harvard University, where he earned the nickname "the deacon" for his manners and studiousness. In 1971, he graduated magna cum laude with a bachelor's degree in English history and literature before earning a master's degree in philosophy from Balliol College and a master's degree in journalism from the Columbia University Graduate School of Journalism.

== Professional work ==
Pear began working for The Washington Star in 1974, leaving the newspaper shortly before its closure in 1979 to join The New York Times' Washington bureau. His byline appeared on more than 6,700 stories published by the Times, with the last one being published on April 20, 2019, shortly before his death.

His output has been described as "meticulous" and "authoritative" by other journalists, who praised his work in the field of health care policy reporting. Articles written by Pear were closely watched by Washington politicians.

== Death ==
Pear died aged 69 on May 7, 2019, in his home in Rockville, Maryland, from complications of a stroke. Both Democratic Senate minority leader Chuck Schumer and Republican Senator Chuck Grassley paid tribute to Pear in speeches in the Senate.
