= Anthony Sampson =

British writer and journalist (1926–2004)

- Born: Anthony Terrell Seward Sampson; 3 August 1926; Billingham, County Durham
- Died: 18 December 2004 (aged 78); Wardour, Wiltshire
- Occupations: Journalist, biographer
- Known for: Mandela: The Authorised Biography
- Spouse: Sally Sampson (1965–)

Anthony Terrell Seward Sampson (3 August 1926 – 18 December 2004) was a British writer and journalist. His most notable and successful book was Anatomy of Britain, which was published in 1962 and was followed by five more "Anatomies", updating the original book under various titles. He was the grandson of the linguist John Sampson, of whom he wrote a biography, The Scholar Gypsy: The Quest For A Family Secret (1997). He also gave Nelson Mandela advice on Mandela's famous 1964 defence speech at the trial which led to his conviction for life.

== Early life and education ==
Sampson was born in Billingham, County Durham, son of Lieutenant Colonel Michael Trevisky Sampson, King's Royal Rifle Corps, OBE, MC, chief scientist for Imperial Chemical Industries, and Phyllis, daughter of the botanist and geologist Sir Albert Seward. Michael Sampson was assigned as technical director of ICI to the Billingham nitrogen works. He was educated at Westminster School. In 1944 he joined the Royal Navy, and by the time he left, in 1947, he was a sub-lieutenant in the Royal Naval Volunteer Reserve. He then studied English at Christ Church, Oxford.

== Career ==
In 1951 Sampson went to Johannesburg, South Africa, to become editor of the magazine Drum, remaining there for four years. After his return to the United Kingdom, he joined the editorial staff of The Observer, where he worked from 1955 to 1966.

He was the author of a series of books, starting with Anatomy of Britain (1962), in which he explored the workings of the British state and other major social institutions, in particular the large corporation. He took an interest in broad political and economic power structures, but he also saw power as personal. He occasionally offered psychoanalytical interpretations of power players, as in this passage from The Money Lenders:

"[Bankers] seem specially conscious of time, always aware that time is money. There is always a sense of restraint and tension. (Is it part of the connection which Freud observed between compulsive neatness, anal eroticism and interest in money?)"

Sampson was a personal friend of Nelson Mandela before Mandela became politically active. In 1964 Sampson attended the Rivonia Trial in support of Mandela and other ANC leaders, and in 1999 he published the authorised biography of Mandela.

Sampson was also a founding member of the now defunct Social Democratic Party (SDP).

Sampson's personal archive, catalogued by the Bodleian Library, was made public for the first time in 2012.

== Personal life ==
On his return from South Africa in 1965, Sampson married Sally Virginia, daughter of medical practitioner Philip Graeme Bentlif, MD, MRCS, LRCP, of Jersey. She was a Justice of the Peace and was a bench chairman of the Youth Court at Camberwell, London.

== Bibliography ==
=== Books ===
- Sampson, Anthony (1956). Drum: a venture in the new Africa. With photographs by Bob Gosani and Jurgen Schadeberg. London: Collins.
- Drum: the Making of a Magazine. Johannesburg: Jonathan Ball Publishers, 2005. ISBN 9781868422111.
- The Treason Cage (1958)
- Common Sense About Africa (1960)
- Anatomy of Britain (1962) online free
- Anatomy of Britain Today (1965)
- Macmillan: A Study in Ambiguity (1967)
- The New Europeans. A guide to the workings, institutions and character of contemporary Western Europe (1968)
- The New Anatomy of Britain (1971) online free
- The Sovereign State of ITT (1973)
- The Seven Sisters (a study of the international oil industry) (1974, ISBN 0-553-20449-1)
- Serpico (with Peter Maas) (1976)
- The Arms Bazaar (a study of the international arms trade) (1977)
- The Money Lenders (a study of international banking) (1981)
- The Changing Anatomy of Britain (1982; fourth impression 1989)
- Black Gold (a novel about the crumbling of apartheid and the business/financial picture in South Africa) (1987)
- The Midas Touch (a study of money; book and TV series) (1989, ISBN 0-340-48793-3 or 0-563-20853-8 (BBC))
- The Essential Anatomy of Britain: Democracy in Crisis (1992) online free
- Company Man (a study of corporate life) (1995)
- The Scholar Gypsy: The Quest for a Family Secret (1997)
- Mandela: The Authorised Biography (1999), winner of the Alan Paton Award
- Who Runs This Place?: The Anatomy of Britain in the 21st Century (2004)
- The Anatomist (his autobiography, prepared for publication by his widow and family) (2008)

=== Critical studies, reviews and biography ===
- Jones, Eric (October 1995). "Up the organisation". Books. Quadrant. 39 (10): 79–81. Review of Company man.
